= BE-3 (solid motor) =

Retired American solid rocket stage

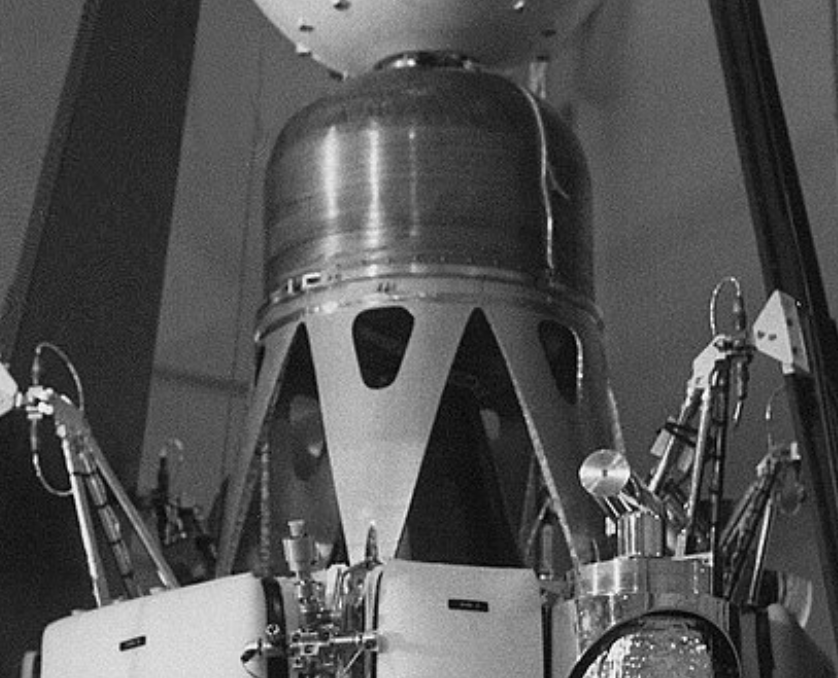
A BE-3 mated into Ranger 4, with the nozzle partially visible.

The BE-3, also known as Alcyone, was a solid rocket motor designed by Hercules Inc. that was flown from 1962 to 1984. The BE-3 motor was originally made for use as a retrorocket on the Ranger moon missions, though would later fly multiple times as the apogee kick motor (AKM) on various satellites, most commonly being for the Vela satellites. The vast majority of BE-3 variants launched were BE-3B1s, which frequently flew as upper stages on most Athena RTV rockets, some Strypi variants, and the Sparta rocket. When used as a stage, the BE-3B1 was designated as Alcyone. In 1971, use of the BE-3 began to drastically dwindle, with its final three flights being in 1972, 1974, and 1984, with just one launch per year each.

== Details ==
- Thrust: 34.00 kN (7,640 lbf)
- Wet mass: 100 kg (220 lb)
- Dry mass (BE-3): 28 kg (62 lb)
- Dry mass (BE-3B1): 39 kg (86 lb)
- Burn time (BE-3): 9.0 s
- Burn time (BE-3B): 7.9 s

=== Specific to the BE-3B ===
- Height: 0.89 m (2.9 ft)
- Motor Diameter: 0.46 m (1.5 ft)
- Nozzle Diameter: 0.29 m (0.95 ft)

== Variants ==
- BE-3: Used as the retrorocket on Ranger 3, 4, and 5, all of which were launched in 1962. Also flown on the Sparta rocket as the 3rd stage. On Sparta's final flight, it was mated directly to WRESAT.
- BE-3A: Used 3 times as the AKMs for Vela 1 through 6.
- BE-3B1: Used as the 5th stage on Athena RTV rockets—other than the Athena H, a 4-stage variant—and the Strypi VI, VIIAR, and the VIIR; by far the most flown variant. Also used as the AKM for Vela 7 and 8.
- BE-3A7: AKM for Vela 9 through 12.
- BE-3A9: Flown once as an kick motor for the AMPTE-IRM spacecraft, launched aboard a Delta 3924; only Delta launch of a BE-3.
