= Sparta (rocket) =

Joint rocket program for anti-missile research and first Australian orbital satellite

- Function: Sounding rocket Launch system
- Manufacturer: ABMA/Chrysler
- Country of origin: United States

Size
- Height: 21.8 meters (72 ft)
- Diameter: 1.78 meters (5 ft 10 in)
- Mass: 30,000 kilograms (66,000 lb)
- Stages: 3

Capacity

Payload to LEO
- Mass: 45 kilograms (99 lb)

Associated rockets
- Family: Redstone
- Comparable: Jupiter-C; Juno I

Launch history
- Status: Retired
- Launch sites: Woomera Test Range LA-8
- Total launches: 10
- Success(es): 9
- Failure: 1
- First flight: November 28, 1966
- Last flight: November 29, 1967
- Carries passengers or cargo: Sparta re-entry vehicles, WRESAT

First stage – Redstone
- Powered by: 1 A-7
- Maximum thrust: 416 kilonewtons (94,000 lbf)
- Specific impulse: 265 sec
- Burn time: 155 seconds
- Propellant: LOX/Ethanol

Second stage – Antares-2
- Powered by: 1 X-259
- Maximum thrust: 93 kilonewtons (21,000 lbf)
- Specific impulse: 293 sec
- Burn time: 36 seconds
- Propellant: Solid

Third stage – BE-3 Alcyone
- Powered by: 1 solid
- Maximum thrust: 34 kilonewtons (7,600 lbf)
- Burn time: 9 seconds
- Propellant: Solid

The Sparta (or Redstone-Sparta, both from the acronym ‘Special Anti-missile Research Tests, Australia’) was a three-stage orbital rocket launched between 1966 and 1967 from Launch Area 8 (LA-8) at the Woomera Test Range in Woomera, South Australia. Australia's first satellite, WRESAT, was launched into a polar orbit by the final Sparta rocket on November 29, 1967.

Ten Sparta rockets were developed, one of which was placed in reserve. The first nine launched as part of the joint United States–United Kingdom–Australian research program, known as Project SPARTA, aimed at better understanding re-entry phenomena from various model warheads, made as a follow-up to previous similar joint projects.

Sparta used modified surplus American Redstone rockets as its first stage, a Thiokol Antares 2 from the Scout rocket as its second stage, and a BE-3 Alcyone solid-propellant engine as its third stage. Both of these upper stages were spin-stabilised during launch to approximately 150 rpm prior to first stage separation.

In 1990, the first stage of the Sparta rocket that had launched WRESAT was recovered from the Simpson Desert after being found by explorer Dick Smith the previous year.

== Launches ==
The re-entry profiles of the SPARTA test vehicles would be closely monitored and examined from ground-based systems to aid in the development of anti-missile counter-weapon systems. For these launches, the BE-3 third stage was used to achieve higher descent speeds of around 6 kilometers per second (13,000 mph).

Early into the Sparta program, the idea of using the final launch vehicle for sending a scientific payload into orbit was proposed, leading to the planning, creation, and launching of WRESAT.

Re-entry payloads launched by the Redstone Sparta were simply referred to as Sparta 1 through 9. The first launch was a failure and was destroyed by range safety, while the rest were successful.

Sparta launches
Date	Mission Description	Nation	Agency	Apogee (km)
November 28, 1966	Sparta SV-1 (re-entry vehicle)	US	US Army	90
December 13, 1966	Sparta SV-2 (re-entry vehicle)	US	US Army	90
April 20, 1967	Sparta SV-3 (re-entry vehicle)	US	US Army	90
July 4, 1967	Sparta SV-4 (re-entry vehicle)	US	US Army	90
July 24, 1967	Sparta SV-5 (re-entry vehicle)	US	US Army	90
August 17, 1967	Sparta SV-6 (re-entry vehicle)	US	US Army	90
September 15, 1967	Sparta SV-7 (re-entry vehicle)	US	US Army	91
October 11, 1967	Sparta SV-8 (re-entry vehicle)	US	US Army	137
October 31, 1967	Sparta SV-9 (re-entry vehicle)	US	US Army	111
November 29, 1967	WRESAT (satellite)	Australia	WRE	1252

== Gallery ==
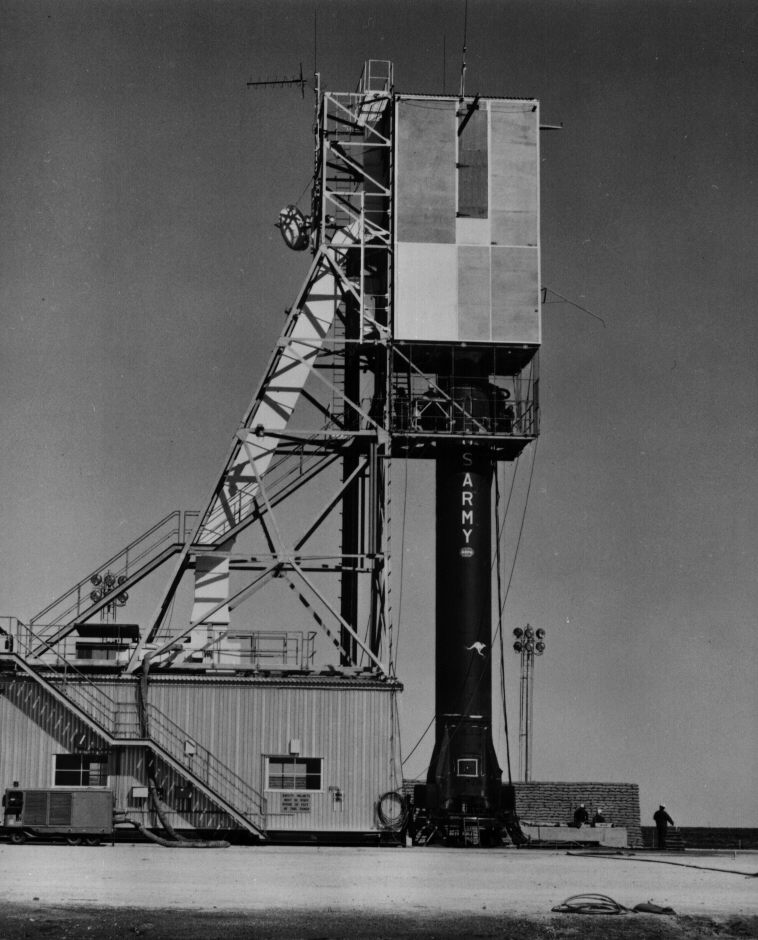
Redstone-Sparta at Woomera LA8

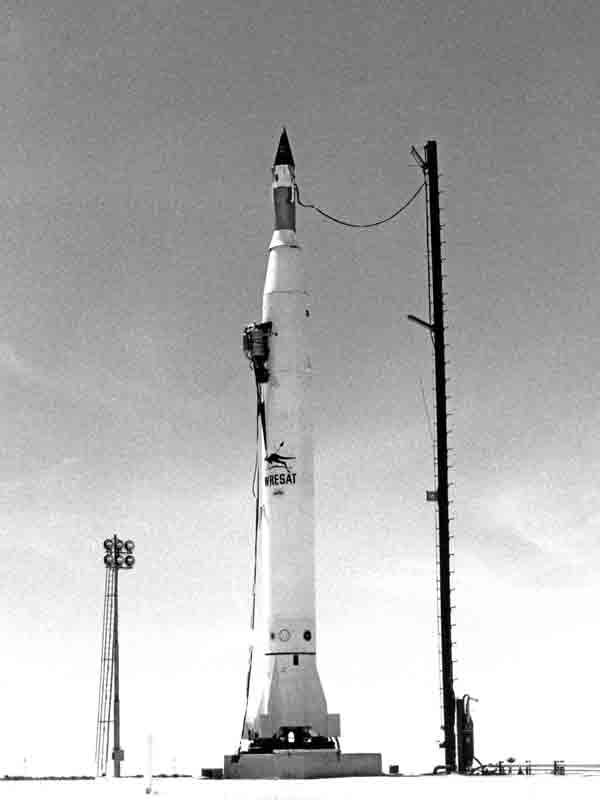
Preparation for launch of Redstone-Sparta CC-2029 at Woomera LA8

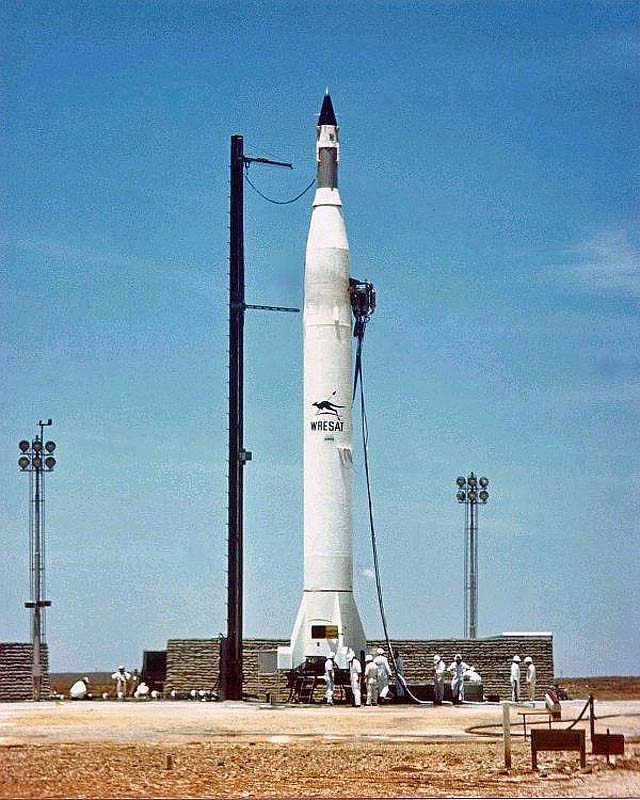
Preparation for launch of Redstone-Sparta CC-2029 at Woomera LA8

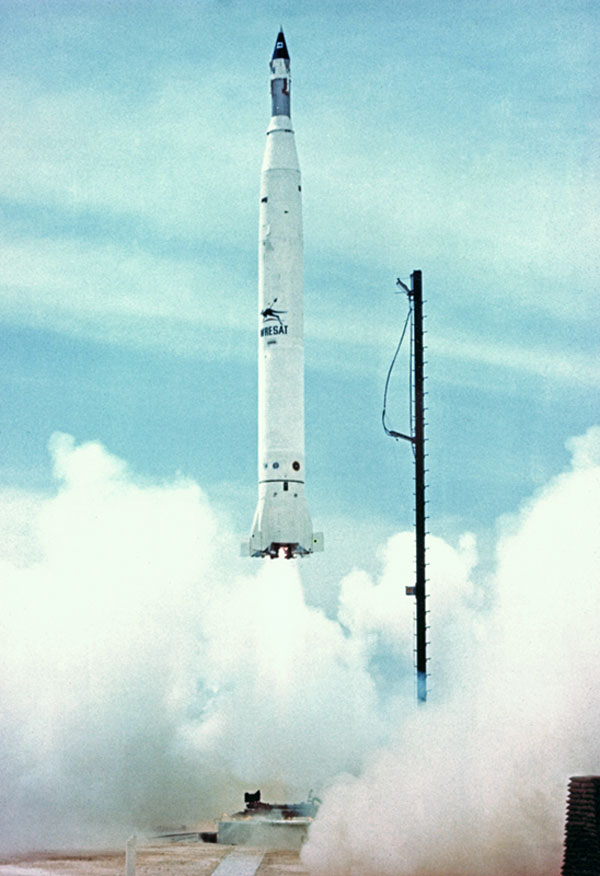
Launch of Redstone-Sparta CC-2029 with WRESAT satellite (November 29, 1967)

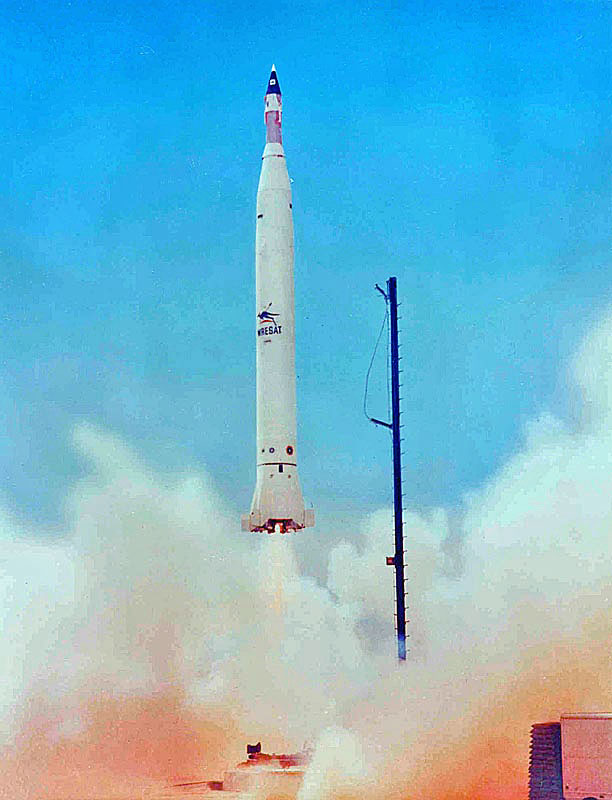
Launch of Redstone-Sparta CC-2029 with WRESAT satellite (November 29, 1967)

== On display ==
Sparta first stage remains are displayed at the Woomera Rocket Park, Woomera, South Australia).
