= Redstone (rocket family) =

Class of ballistic missile

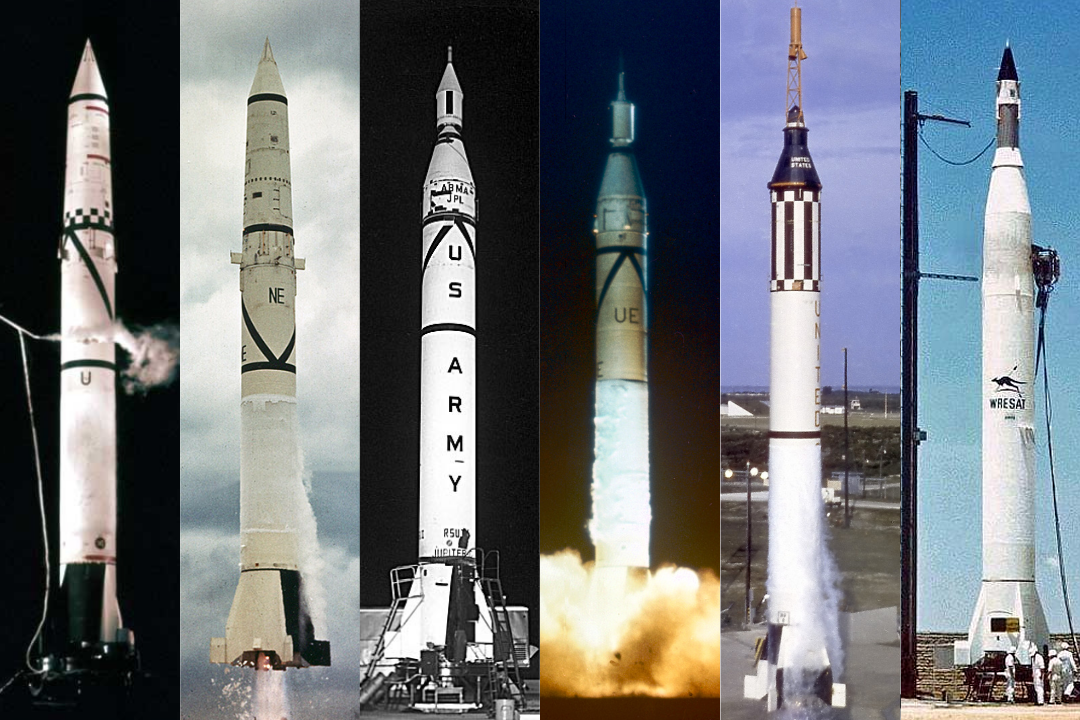
Redstone family: PGM-11 Redstone, Jupiter-A, Jupiter-C, Juno I, Mercury-Redstone and Redstone Sparta

The Redstone family of rockets consisted of a number of American ballistic missiles, sounding rockets and expendable launch vehicles operational during the 1950s and 1960s. The first member of the Redstone family was the PGM-11 Redstone missile, from which all subsequent variations of the Redstone were derived. The Juno 1 version of the Redstone launched Explorer 1, the first U.S. orbital satellite in 1958 and the Mercury-Redstone variation carried the first two U.S. astronauts into space in 1961. The rocket was named for the Redstone Arsenal in Huntsville, Alabama where it was developed.

== PGM-11 Redstone ==
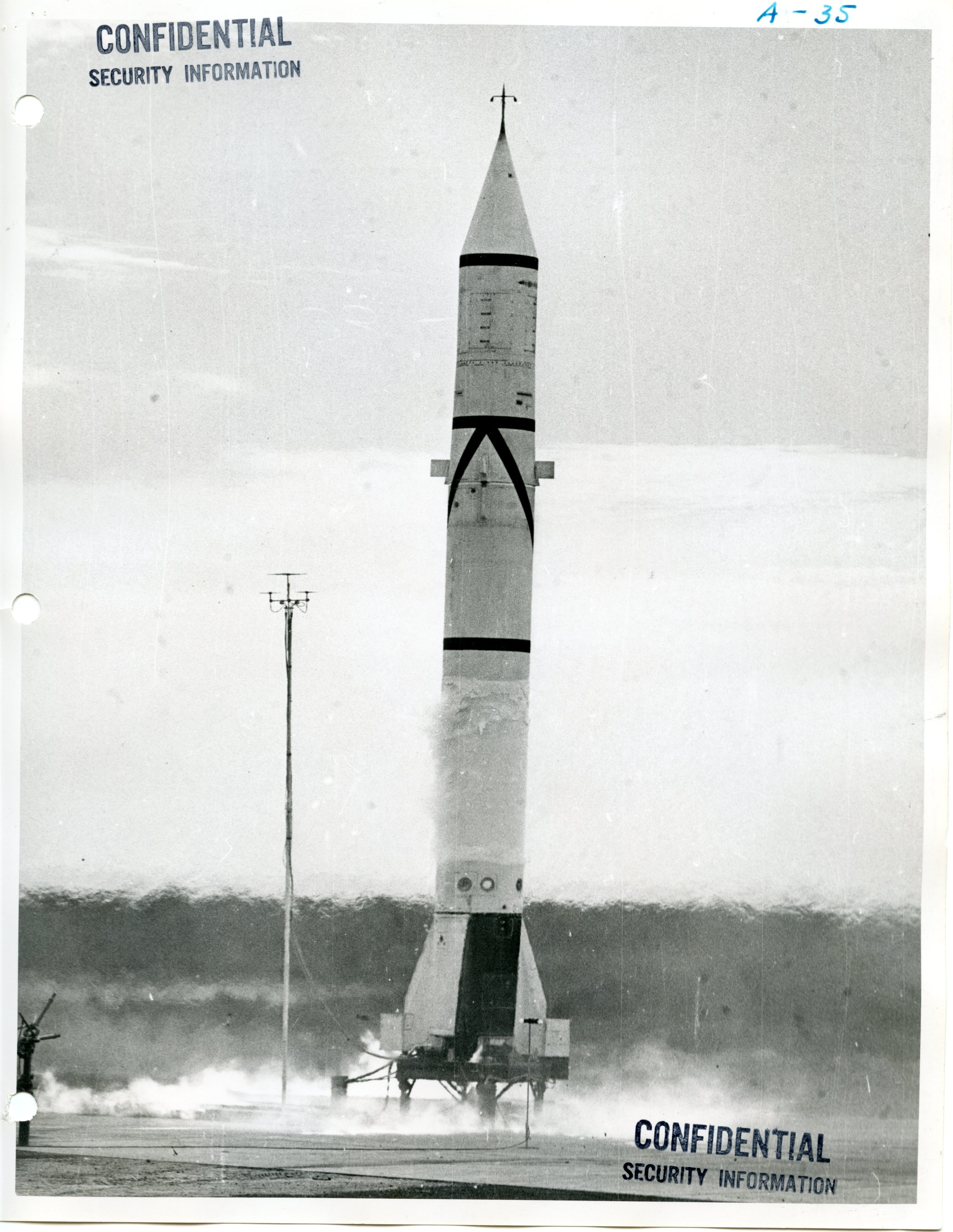
PGM-11 Redstone RS-01

First launched in 1953, the PGM-11 Redstone was a short-range surface-to-surface ballistic missile in active service with the U.S. Army from June 1958 to June 1964; and was used for the first U.S. live nuclear missile tests. It was built by Chrysler for the United States Army Ballistic Missile Agency (ABMA) and was deployed in West Germany. George Huebner was the executive engineer in charge of Chrysler's missile program for its first two years of operation.

== Jupiter-A ==
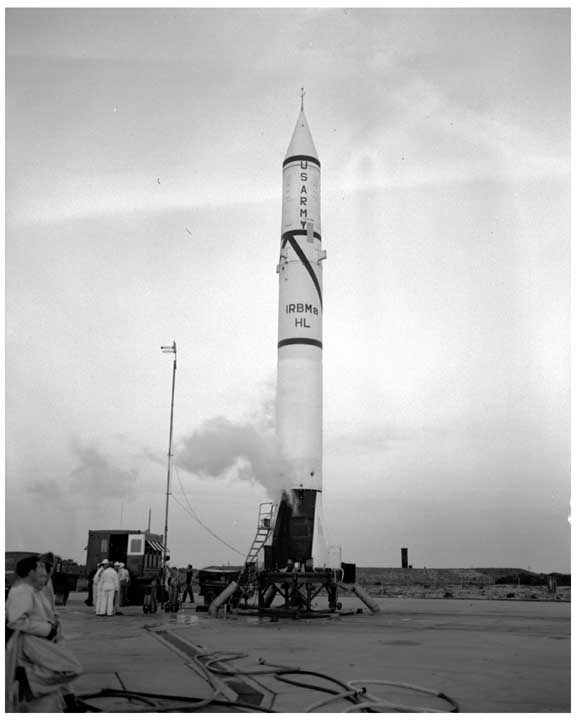
Jupiter-A RS-18

Jupiter-A was the first variant of Redstone, used to test components later used in the PGM-19 Jupiter medium-range ballistic missile.

The early Jupiter-A featured a different fuselage design. Components incorporated into the Jupiter-A included the Redstone ST-80 inertial guidance platform, Jupiter angle-of-attack sensors, warhead fusion systems and explosive bolts.

A total of twenty-five launches took place from Cape Canaveral Air Force Base, Florida, on Launch Complexes 5 and 6, between 1955 and 1958.

== Jupiter-C ==
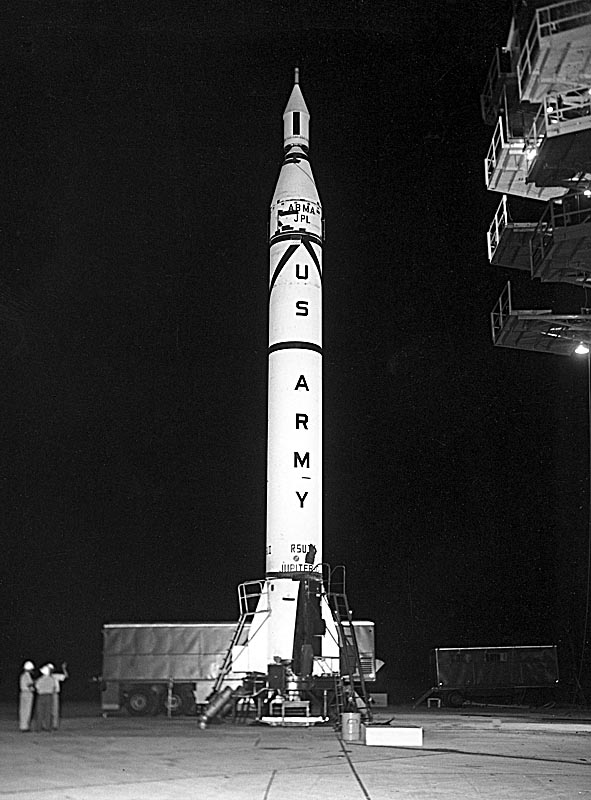
Jupiter-C

Jupiter-C was a sounding rocket used for three sub-orbital spaceflights in 1956 and 1957. It was used as a testbed for re-entry vehicles later deployed on the PGM-19 Jupiter.

== Juno I ==
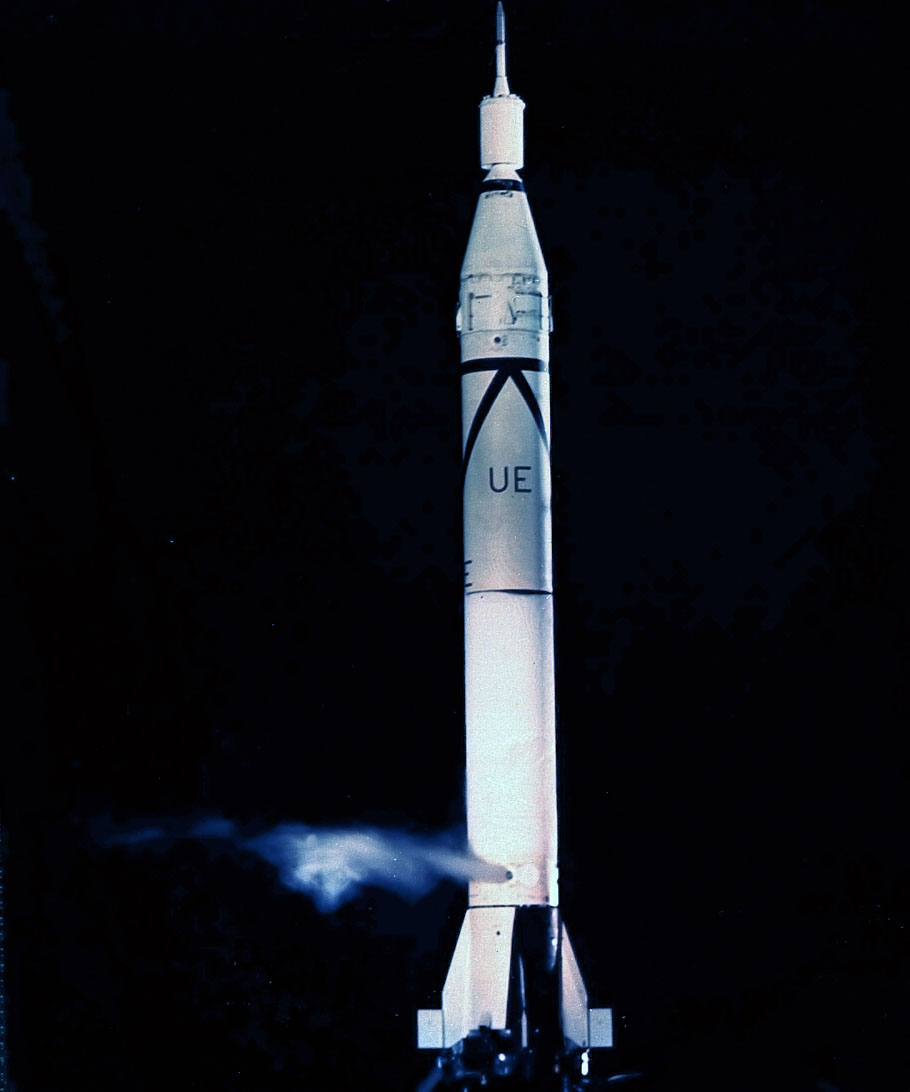
Juno I awaiting launch with Explorer I

Juno I was a derivative of the Jupiter-C, used to launch the first American satellite, Explorer 1, on January 31, 1958. Although the U.S. possibly could have put a satellite into orbit before the Soviet Union had the ABMA been allowed to attempt a satellite launch in August 1956, the Eisenhower administration wanted the first U.S. satellite to be launched by a civilian rocket developed by American engineers instead of a rocket derived from a military missile program and developed by the German engineers of Operation Paperclip. Additionally, the administration saw value in the USSR taking the first move to reach orbit because they would set the precedent that territorial overflight in space was fair game, necessary for the United States' space-based photoreconnaissance ambitions in the wake of diplomatic protests against U-2 incursions of Soviet airspace.

The Vanguard launch vehicle was the civilian rocket program in development for this purpose, so the administration ordered ABMA's research director, Wernher von Braun, not to attempt any satellite launches. The Vanguard rocket failed on its first attempt to launch the Vanguard satellite in December 1957, crashing back to the pad and exploding. Following this setback and in the wake of the Sputnik crisis, the administration changed course and turned to the Army, asking ABMA and von Braun to launch the JPL-built satellite as soon as possible.

== Mercury-Redstone ==
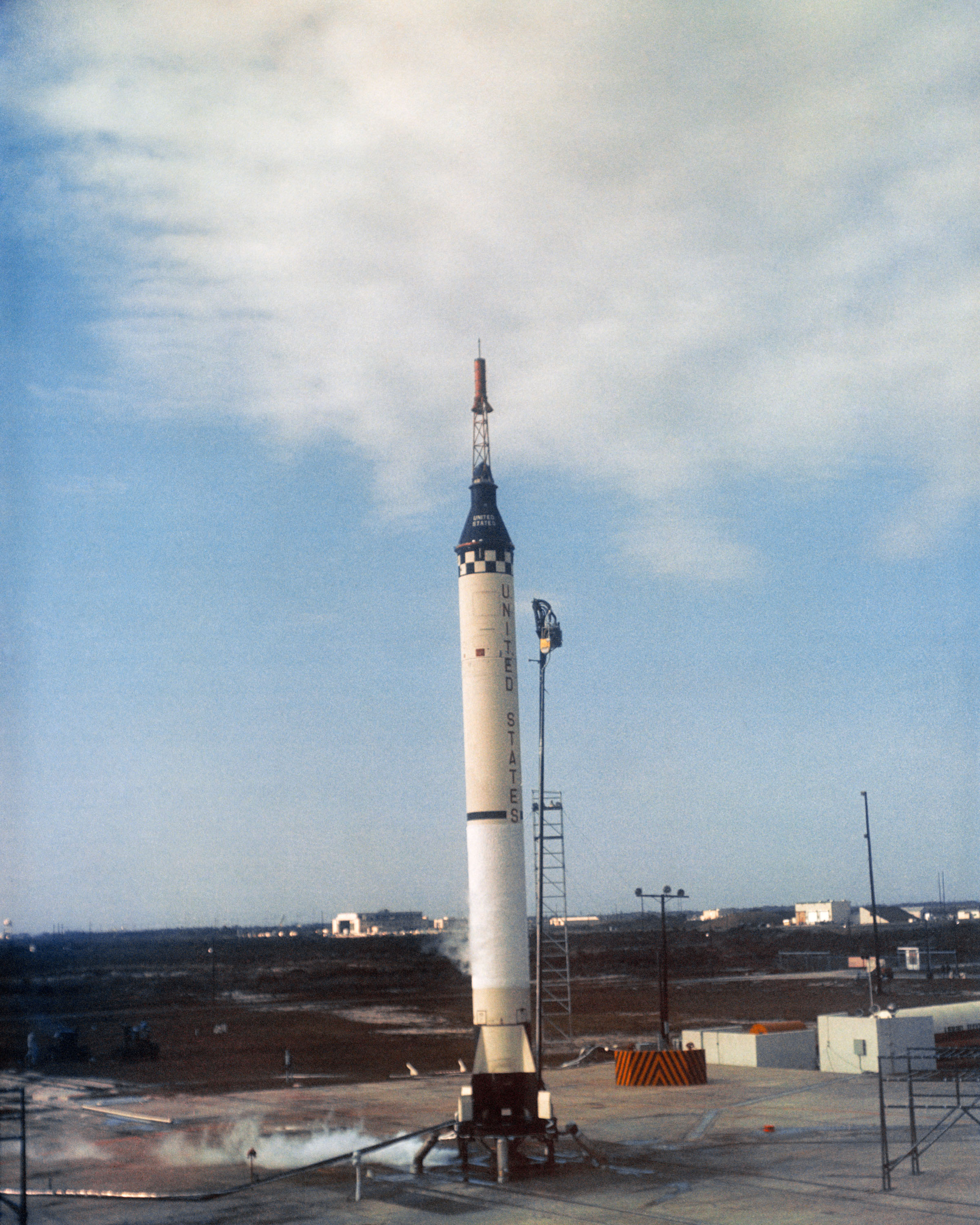
Mercury-Redstone 1 launch attempt

The Mercury-Redstone Launch Vehicle (MRLV), also known as Mercury-Redstone, used the stretched Redstone configuration from the Jupiter-C for six suborbital launches for Project Mercury in 1960 and 1961, including United States' first two human spaceflights:

- Mercury-Redstone 1, abort, traveled 4 inches (100 mm)
- Mercury-Redstone 1A, successful uncrewed flight
- Mercury-Redstone 2, carried Ham, a chimpanzee
- Mercury-Redstone BD, booster development – final test before crewed flight
- Mercury-Redstone 3 (Freedom 7), first American in space, Alan Shepard
- Mercury-Redstone 4 (Liberty Bell 7), second American in space, Gus Grissom

== Sparta ==
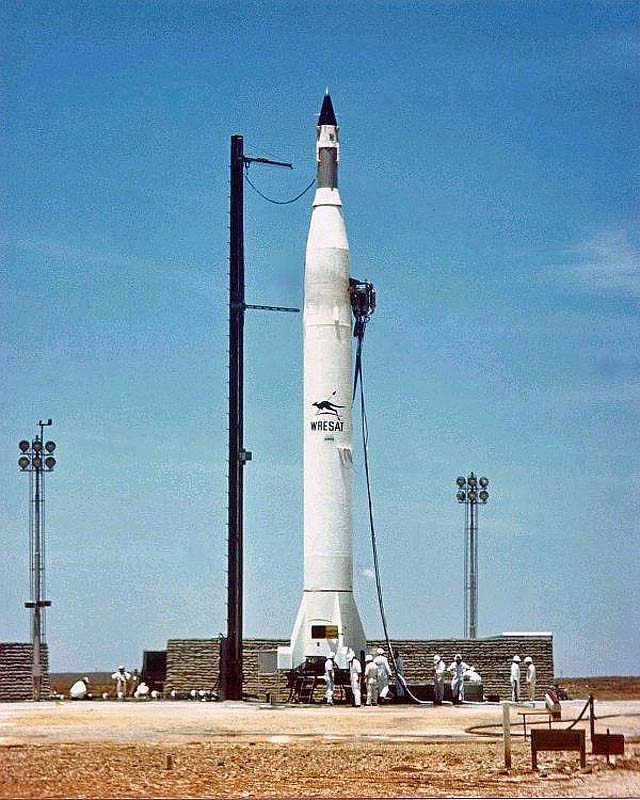
Redstone Sparta CC-2029

Sparta was the name given to a series of surplus Redstone missiles with two solid-fuel upper stages launched as part of a joint US-UK research project with Australia from 1966 to 1967. Sparta launched Australia's first Earth satellite, WRESAT.

== Saturn ==
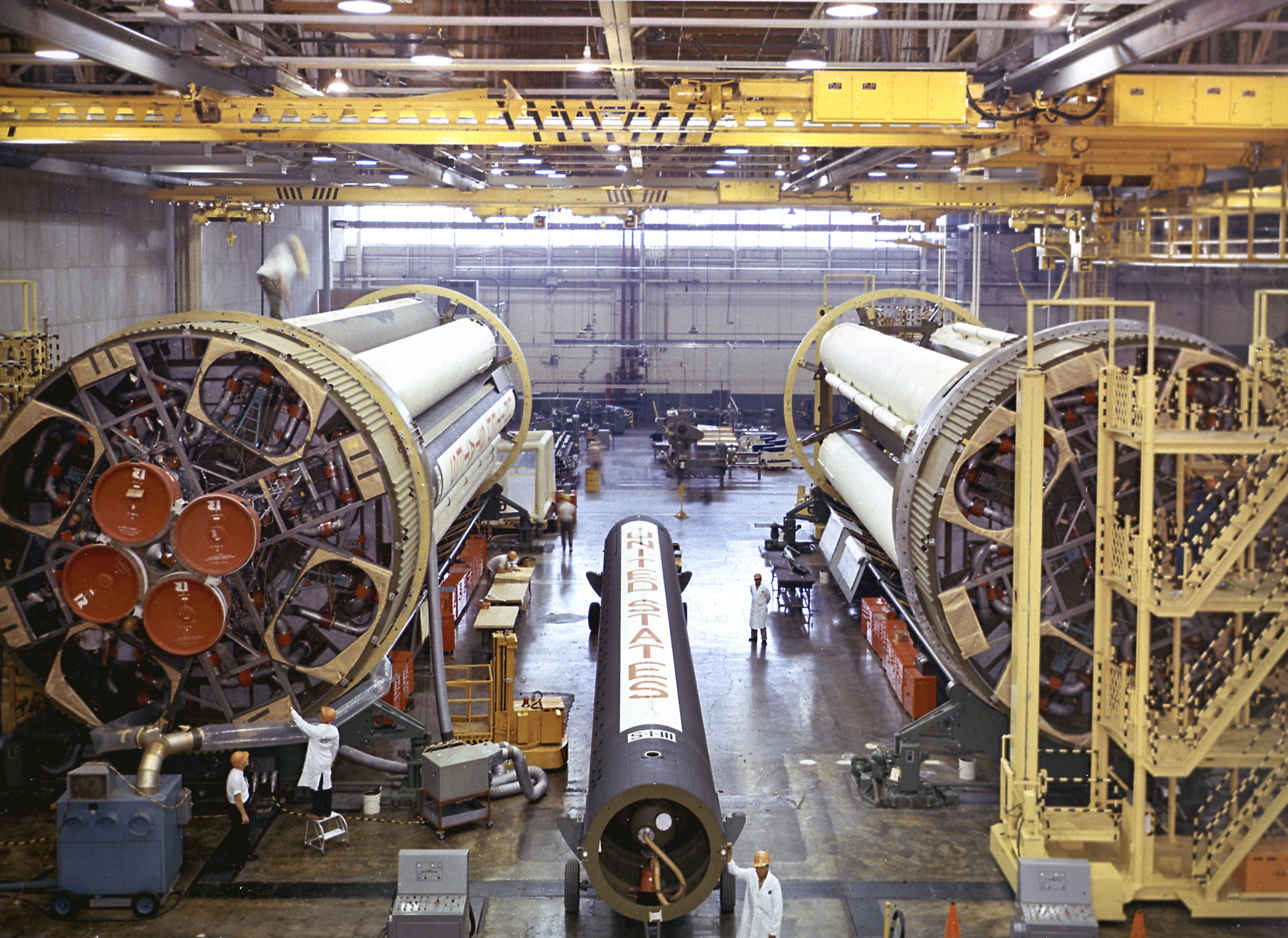
Saturn I first stage, with the eight Redstone derived tanks visible.

Two members of the Saturn family of rockets, the Saturn I and IB, were partially derived from the Redstone. They used eight tanks built on Redstone tooling clustered around one propellant tank built on Jupiter missile tooling, and used eight Rocketdyne H-1 (Jupiter) engines to form the first stage of the rockets. First developed by the ABMA, the Saturn rocket was adopted by NASA for its Apollo program. America's first heavy-lift launch vehicles, the first of these was launched in 1961.
