= AMPTE-UKS =

United Kingdom satellite of the Explorer program

- Names: AMPTE-United Kingdom Subsatellite
- Mission type: Magnetosphere research
- Operator: NASA / United Kingdom
- COSPAR ID: 1984-088C
- SATCAT no.: 15201
- Mission duration: 5 months (achieved)

Spacecraft properties
- Spacecraft: AMPTE-UKS
- Spacecraft type: Active Magnetospheric Particle Tracer Explorers (AMPTE)
- Bus: AMPTE-United Kingdom Subsatellite
- Manufacturer: Rutherford Appleton Laboratory
- Launch mass: 77 kg (170 lb)

Start of mission
- Launch date: 16 August 1984, 14:48 UTC
- Rocket: Delta 3924 (Delta 175)
- Launch site: Cape Canaveral, LC-17A
- Contractor: Douglas Aircraft Company
- Entered service: 16 August 1984

End of mission
- Last contact: 15 January 1985

Orbital parameters
- Reference system: Geocentric orbit
- Regime: Highly elliptical orbit
- Perigee altitude: 550 km (340 mi)
- Apogee altitude: 112,800 km (70,100 mi)
- Inclination: 28.50°
- Period: 2630.00 minutes

Instruments
- 3-D Electron Analyzer (6 eV-25 keV, 8-Sector, 5-seconds Averaged); 3-D Ion Analyzer (10 eV-20 keV/Q, 12-Sector, 5-seconds Averaged); Particle Modulation Analyzer (1 Hz-1 MHz Fast Fourier Transform); Plasma Wave Spectrometer (100 Hz-3 MHz E, 100 Hz-60 kHz B); Triaxial Magnetometer (Dual Range 0.03 nT Accuracy)

AMPTE-UKS, also called AMPTE-United Kingdom Subsatellite, was a United Kingdom satellite designed and tasked to study the magnetosphere of Earth, being launched as part of the Explorer program. The AMPTE (Active Magnetospheric Particle Tracer Explorers) mission was designed to study the access of solar wind ions to the magnetosphere, the convective-diffusive transport and energization of magnetospheric particles, and the interactions of plasmas in space.

== Mission ==
The AMPTE-UKS is one of the three components of the international space mission AMPTE, which also included AMPTE-CCE (Charge Compositio9n Explorer), designed by NASA, and AMPTE-IRM (Ion Release Module), provided by Germany.

== Spacecraft ==
The program consisted of three spacecraft: the AMPTE-CCE, which measured, in the magnetosphere, the ions released by the AMPTE-IRM; the AMPTE-IRM, which provided multiple ion releases in the solar wind, the magnetosheath, and the magnetotail, with in situ diagnostics of each; and the AMPTE-UKS. The AMPTE-UKS was one spacecraft of the AMPTE program (along with AMPTE-CCE and AMPTE-IRM) and served as a subsatellite of the AMPTE-IRM spacecraft. Its purpose was to help distinguish between spatial structure and temporal changes in the plasma phenomena initiated by ion releases from the AMPTE-IRM and in the natural magnetospheric environment. Measured quantitie were similar to those of the AMPTE-IRM and include magnetic fields, positive ions, electrons, plasma waves, and modulations in ions and electrons. The spacecraft was spin-stabilized at 12 rpm and employed S-band communications. It carried a cold gas propulsion system and a very high frequency (VHF) radar system for station keeping with the AMPTE-IRM normally at a distance of a few hundred kilometers.

== Launch ==
AMPTE-UKS was launched with the two other satellites of the AMPTE program on 16 August 1984, at 16:48 UTC, from a Cape Canaveral launch pad by a Delta 3924 launch vehicle.

== Experiments ==
=== 3-D Electron Analyzer (6 eV-25 keV, 8-Sector, 5-seconds Averaged) ===
Electron distribution functions were measured using two hemispherical electrostatic analyzers with microchannel plate detectors. The instrument had several operating modes. In its primary mode, electron intensities were measured, in 1-second periods, in 24 energy channels covering the range 6 eV to 25 keV within 8 angular sectors spanning 180° relative to the spacecraft spin axis. Data from a complete 5-second UKS spin period were needed to measure the three-dimensional distribution function. The geometric factors of the sectors were within the range 0.4 to 1.0 mm^{2} (0.0016 sq in)-sr and the energy bandwidth, delta E/E, was 3%.

=== 3-D Ion Analyzer (10 eV-20 keV/Q, 12-Sector, 5-seconds Averaged) ===
The objective of this investigation was to study the three-dimensional ion distributions in the plasma clouds, the solar wind, the magnetosphere, and the boundaries between them and to measure these distributions with high time and angular resolutions. The instrument consisted of a pair of 270° spherical electrostatic energy analyzers with microchannel plate detectors that measured the three-dimensional energy/charge distribution of positive ions from 10 eV/Q to 20 keV/Q over the polar angle range 0 to 180° with respect to the spin axis of the spacecraft. A complete set of measurements was obtained every 5-second spin period.

=== Particle Modulation Analyzer (1 Hz-1 MHz Fast Fourier Transform) ===
The instrument consisted of microprocessor-controlled counting and timing circuitry which used as input the particle arrival pulses from the electron and ion spectrometers on board the spacecraft. The instrument computed autocorrelation functions and Fast Fourier transforms of the particle modulations resulting from wave-particle interactions in the frequency range 1 Hz to 1 MHz with an average frequency resolution of 3%.

=== Plasma Wave Spectrometer (100 Hz-3 MHz E, 100 Hz-60 kHz B) ===
The instrument consisted of an electric dipole antenna with 7 m (23 ft) separation between its sensors and a high permeability core coil to measure the magnetic component of the wave field. The electric component was measured up to 2 MHz and the magnetic component up to kHz. The signal processing equipment was composed of a stepped-frequency analyzer covering the range up to 130 kHz and four discrete filters with 10% bandwidths covering the range up to 2 MHz. A correlator (64 point auto) permitted study at higher frequency resolution.

=== Triaxial Magnetometer (Dual Range 0.03 nT Accuracy) ===
The objective of this investigation was to study the magnetic fields in the near-Earth environment. The instrument consisted of a three-axis orthogonal fluxgate magnetometer with ring-core sensors. It was a refurbished ISEE-1 and ISEE-3 flight spare. One of the two possible ranges, ± 256 or 8192 nT, could be selected by ground command. The accuracy of the instrument was ± 1 nT per axis in the high range and ± 0.03 nT in the low range.

== End of mission ==
The spacecraft power supply failed on 15 January 1985.

== See also ==
- AMPTE-CCE
- AMPTE-IRM
- Explorer program
