= Strypi =

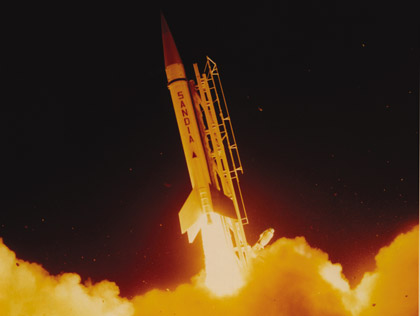
Launch of one of Sandia’s Strypi rockets in 1962

Strypi is a family of US re-entry vehicle test boosters, anti-missile targets and sounding rockets. They use a Castor first stage with two Recruit strap-on boosters, plus a range of upper stages. It is 31 inches (79 centimeters) in diameter, and has a maximum flight height of 124 miles (200 kilometers).

== History ==
It was originally designed and built in 1962 by teams from the Sandia National Laboratories in an around-the-clock program that was a part of a larger nuclear weapons testing program, undertaken prior to the imposition of the Limited Test Ban Treaty (LTBT) in October, 1963. It was designed to take a nuclear warhead into space for extra-atmospheric testing. Though it performed this function only once, in Test Checkmate of Operation Fishbowl, it became the "workhorse" of Sandia's rocket research program. The rocket's name came from the efforts of the Sandia teams, which had "taken the tiger by the tail".

In 1968, a modified Strypi was used in Material Test Vehicle (MTV) booster tests. Although atmospheric nuclear testing was now banned, as a part of the Test Readiness Program the U.S. Air Force continued to develop the means of testing, should the ban be lifted.

== Versions ==
Several versions of Strypi were developed, maintaining the original Recruit and Castor first and second stages or adding a third stage.

Strypi versions
Version	First Launch	Last Launch	Flights	Booster	Stage 1	Stage 2	Stage 3
Strypi Antares	1962-07-09	1962-10-20	7	2 × Recruit	Castor-1	-	-
Strypi-2	1979-11-13		1	2 × Recruit	Castor-1	-	-
Strypi-2R	1974-11-03		1	2 × Recruit	Castor-1	-	-
Strypi-2AR	1974-02-07		1	2 × Recruit	Castor-2	-	-
Strypi-4	1966-09-01		1	2 × Recruit	Castor-1	Star-26	-
Strypi-4A	1974-03-23		1	2 × Recruit	Castor-1	Star-26	-
Strypi-4R	1976-06-07		1	2 × Recruit	Castor-1	Star-26	-
Strypi-6	1968-11-01	1970-06-01	3	2 × Recruit	Castor-1	?	?
Strypi-7R	1975-03-11	1975-09-18	2	2 × Recruit	Castor-1	Alcor-1B	Alcyone IA BE-3
Strypi-7AR	1972-10-15	1974-10-01	2	2 × Recruit	Castor-2	Alcor	Alcyone IA BE-3
Strypi-9	1995-06-26	1995-06-29	2	2 × Recruit	Castor-1	Antares-2A	-
Strypi-11	1987-01-01	1991-02-18	4	2 × Recruit	Castor-1	Antares-2A	Star-27
Strypi-12R	1997-02-10	1997-10-04	2	2 × Recruit	Castor-1	Orbus-1	-
Strypi Tomahawk				2 × Recruit	Castor-1	?	Tomahawk

== Derivatives ==
The SPARK, also known as the Super Strypi, is a three-stage derivative of the Strypi powerful enough to place a 250 kg payload into Sun-synchronous orbit. The Super Strypi was first launched on 3 November 2015, although on that test the first stage failed soon after lift-off.
