= Astrobee =

Series of American sounding rockets

Astrobee is the designation of series of American sounding rockets with one to three stages.

Designed by Aerojet, this family of solid-propellant rockets was conceived as a lower-cost replacement of the liquid-propellant Aerobee.

== Versions ==
=== Astrobee 500 ===
The three-stage Astrobee 500 (first stage: Genius, second stage: Alcor, third stage: Asp) has a ceiling of 1000 km, a takeoff thrust of 161 kN, a takeoff weight of 900 kg, a diameter of 0.38 m and a length of 7.80 m. It was launched one time in 1960.

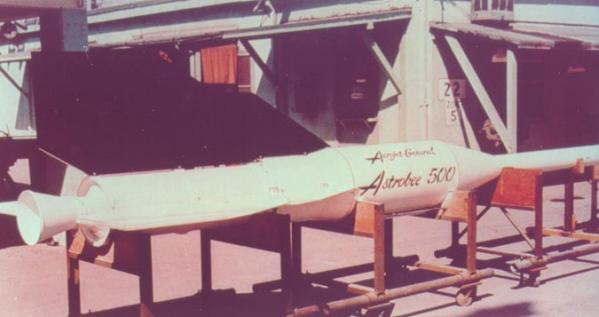
Astrobee-500

=== Astrobee 1500 ===
The three-stage Astrobee 1500 (first stage: Recruit, second stage: Aero jet, third stage: Alcor) has a ceiling of 1000 km, a takeoff thrust of 566 kN, a takeoff weight of 5200 kg, a diameter of 0.79 m and a length of 10.40 m. It was launched ten times between 1961 and 1969.

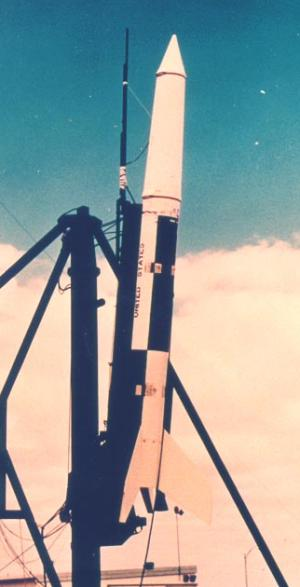
Astrobee 1500

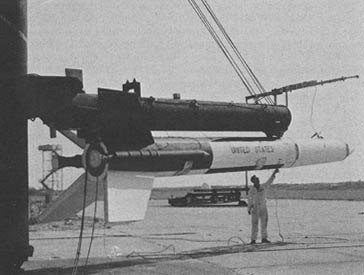
Astrobee 1500

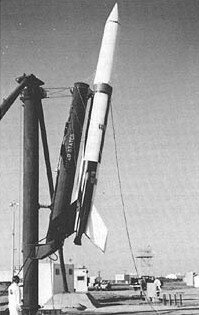
Astrobee 1500

=== Astrobee 200 ===
The two-stage Astrobee 200 (first stage: Nike, second stage: Alcor), has a ceiling of 350 km, a takeoff thrust of 161 kN, a takeoff weight of 800 kg, a diameter of 0.38 m and a length of 6.30 m. It was launched ten times between 1961 and 1966

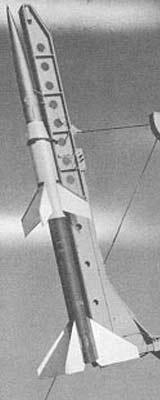
Astrobee 200

=== Astrobee D ===
The single-stage Astrobee D has a ceiling of 140 km, a takeoff thrust of 23.00 kN, a takeoff weight of 100 kg, a diameter of 0.15 m and a length of 3.90 m. It was launched forty-two times between 1970 and 1980.

=== Astrobee F ===
The single-stage Astrobee F has a ceiling of 375 km, a takeoff thrust of 178.00 kN, a takeoff weight of 1500 kg, a diameter of 0.38 m and a length of 11.50 m. It was launched forty-nine times between 1972 and 1983.
