= PGM-11 Redstone =

American short-range ballistic missile

SSM-A-14/M8/PGM-11 Redstone
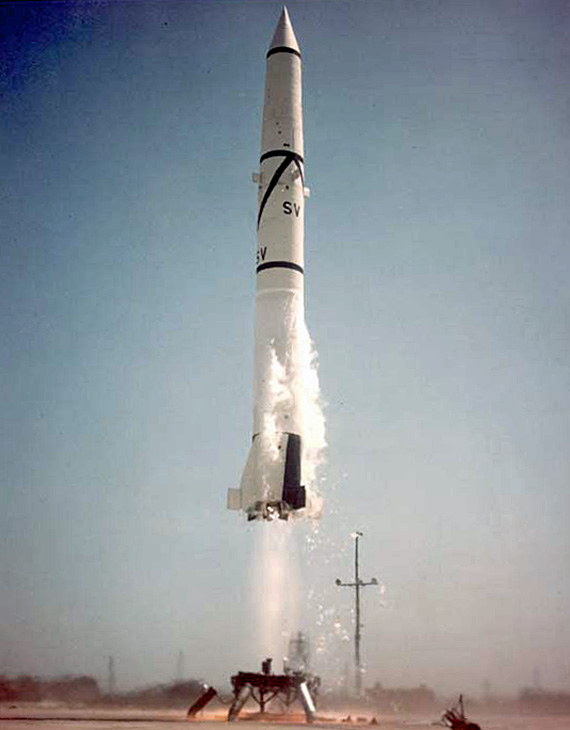
- Redstone No. CC-56, Cape Canaveral, Florida, 17 September 1958
- Type: Tactical ballistic missile; short-range ballistic missile
- Place of origin: United States

Service history
- In service: 1958–1964; 1966–1967
- Used by: United States, Australia

Production history
- Designer: Army Ballistic Missile Agency
- Designed: 1950–1952
- Manufacturer: Chrysler Corporation
- Produced: 1952–1961
- No. built: 128 (ABMA: 27, Chrysler: 101); (85 production models)
- Variants: Block I, Block II

Specifications
- Mass: 61,207 pounds (27,763 kg) at ignition
- Length: 69.3 feet (21.1 m)
- Diameter: 5.83 feet (1.8 m)
- Blast yield: W39 warhead, 3.75 megatons of TNT (15.7 PJ)
- Engine: Rocketdyne North American Aviation 75–110 A-7; 78,000 pounds-force (350 kN) thrust at sea level for 121 seconds
- Payload capacity: 6,305 pounds (2,860 kg)
- Propellant: ethyl alcohol; liquid oxygen
- Fuel capacity: alcohol: 11,135 pounds (5,051 kg); liquid oxygen: 25,280 pounds (11,470 kg); hydrogen peroxide: 790 pounds (360 kg)
- Operational range: 57.5 to 201 miles 92.5 to 323.5 kilometers
- Flight altitude: 28.4 to 58.7 miles 45.7 to 94.5 kilometers
- Boost time: 97 seconds to 155 seconds
- Maximum speed: Mach 5 – Mach 6 (6,100–7,400 km/h; 3,800–4,600 mph; 1.7–2.0 km/s) maximum at re-entry interface
- Guidance system: Ford Instrument Company ST-80 inertial guidance
- Steering system: Carbon jet vanes, air rudders, spatial air jet nozzles, air vanes
- Accuracy: 300 meters (980 ft) CEP
- Launch platform: guided missile platform launcher M74

The PGM-11 Redstone was the first large American ballistic missile. A short-range ballistic missile (SRBM), it was in active service with the United States Army in West Germany from June 1958 to June 1964 as part of NATO's Cold War defense of Western Europe. It was the first US missile to carry a live nuclear warhead, in the 1958 Pacific Ocean weapons test Hardtack Teak.

The Redstone was a direct descendant of the German V-2 rocket, developed primarily by a team of German rocket engineers brought to the United States after World War II. The design used an upgraded engine from Rocketdyne that allowed the missile to carry the 6,900 lb (3,100 kg) W39 and its reentry vehicle to a range of about 175 miles (282 km). Redstone's prime contractor was the Chrysler Corporation.

The Redstone spawned the Redstone rocket family which holds a number of firsts in the US space program, notably launching the first US astronaut. It was retired by the Army in 1964 and replaced by the solid-fueled MGM-31 Pershing. Surplus missiles were widely used for test missions and space launches, including the first US man in space, and in 1967 the launch of Australia's first satellite.

== History ==
U.S. Army Ordnance Missile Command (1958) Official Army PGM-11 Redstone missile information film reel.

Redstone was a direct descendant of the German V-2 rocket, developed by a team of predominantly German rocket engineers under the leadership of Wernher von Braun, that had been brought to the United States after World War II as part of Operation Paperclip.

A product of the Army Ballistic Missile Agency (ABMA) at Redstone Arsenal in Huntsville, Alabama, Redstone was designed as a surface-to-surface missile for the U.S. Army. It was named for the arsenal on 8 April 1952, which traced its name to the region's red rocks and soil. The first Redstone lifted off from LC-4A at Cape Canaveral on 20 August 1953. It flew for one minute and 20 seconds before suffering an engine failure and falling into the sea. Following this partial success, the second test was conducted on 27 January 1954, this time without a hitch as the missile flew 55 miles (89 km). After these first two prototypes were flown, an improved engine was introduced to reduce problems with LOX turbopump cavitation.

The third Redstone flight on 5 May was a total loss as the engine cut off one second after launch, causing the rocket to fall back on the pad and explode. After this incident, Major General Holger Toftoy pressured Wernher von Braun for the cause of the failure. The latter replied that he had no idea, but they would review telemetry and other data to find out. Toftoy persisted, asking "Wernher, why did the rocket explode?" An exasperated von Braun said "It exploded because the damn sonofabitch blew up!"

Von Braun pressured the ABMA team to improve reliability and workmanship standards, allegedly remarking that "Missile reliability will require that the target area is more dangerous than the launch area." Subsequent test flights went better and the Army declared Redstone operational in mid-1955. Testing was moved from LC-4 to the bigger LC-5 and LC-6.

The Redstone program proved to be a bone of contention between the Army and Air Force due to their different ideas of nuclear warfare. The Army favored using small warheads on mobile missiles as tactical battlefield weapons while the Air Force, which was responsible for the ICBM program, wanted large trans-continental missiles that could strike Soviet targets and rapidly cripple the USSR's infrastructure and ability to wage war.

With the arrival of newer solid-fueled missiles that could be stored and not require fueling before launch, Redstone was rendered obsolete and production ended in 1961. The 40th Artillery Group was deactivated in February 1964 and 46th Artillery Group was deactivated in June 1964, as Redstone missiles were replaced by the MGM-31 Pershing missile in the U.S. Army arsenal. All Redstone missiles and equipment deployed to Europe were returned to the United States by the third quarter of 1964. In October 1964, the Redstone missile was ceremonially retired from active service at Redstone Arsenal.

== Description ==
Redstone was capable of flights from 57.5 to 201 miles (92.5 to 323.5 km). It consisted of a thrust unit for powered flight and a missile body for overall missile control and payload delivery on target. During powered flight, Redstone burned a fuel mixture of 25 percent water–75 percent ethyl alcohol with liquid oxygen (LOX) used as the oxidizer. Later Redstones used Hydyne, 60% unsymmetrical dimethylhydrazine (UDMH) and 40% diethylenetriamine (DETA), as the fuel. The missile body consisted of an aft unit containing the instrument compartment, and the warhead unit containing the payload compartment and the radar altimeter fuze. The missile body was separated from the thrust unit 20–30 seconds after the termination of powered flight, as determined by the preset range to target. The body continued on a controlled ballistic trajectory to the target impact point. The thrust unit continued on its own uncontrolled ballistic trajectory, impacting short of the designated target.

The nuclear-armed Redstone carried the W39, either a MK 39Y1 Mod 1 or MK 39Y2 Mod 1, warhead with a yield of 3.8 megatons.

== Production ==
"The Pentatomic Army" (1957).

Chrysler Corporation was awarded the prime production contract, to be made at the newly renamed Michigan Ordnance Missile Plant in Warren, Michigan. The navy-owned facility was previously known as the Naval Industrial Reserve Aircraft Plant used for jet engine production. Following the cancellation of a planned jet engine program, the facility was made available to the Chrysler Corporation for missile production, and began missile and support equipment production in 1952. Rocketdyne Division of North American Aviation Company provided the rocket engines; Ford Instrument Company, division of Sperry Rand Corporation, produced the guidance and control systems; and Reynolds Metals Company fabricated fuselage assemblies as subcontractors to Chrysler.

== Redstone derivatives ==
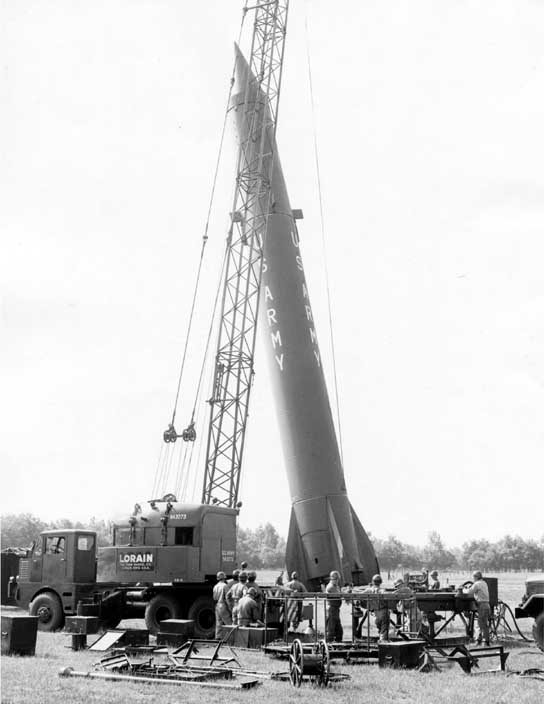
US Army field group erecting Redstone missile.

In 1955, the Jupiter-C rocket (not to be confused with the later, unrelated Jupiter IRBM) was developed as an enhanced Redstone for atmospheric and reentry vehicle tests. It had elongated propellant tanks for increased burn time and a new engine that burned a fuel mixture known as hydyne and under the name of the Jupiter C/Juno 1 was used for the first successful US space launch of the Explorer 1 satellite in 1958.

The Mercury-Redstone Launch Vehicle was a derivation of the Redstone with a fuel tank increased in length by 6 feet (1.8 m) and was used on 5 May 1961 to launch Alan Shepard on his sub-orbital flight to become the second person and first American in space. It retained the Jupiter C's longer propellant tanks, but went back to using ethyl alcohol/water for propellant instead of hydyne. From 1966 to 1967, a series of surplus modified Redstones called Spartas were launched from Woomera, South Australia, as part of a joint U.S.–United Kingdom–Australian research program aimed at understanding re-entry phenomena. These Redstones had two solid fuel upper stages added. The U.S. donated a spare Sparta for Australia's first satellite launch, WRESAT, in November 1967.

== Operators ==
United States
United States Army

- 40th Field Artillery Group 1958–1961 – West Germany
  - 1st Battalion, 333rd Artillery Regiment
- 46th Field Artillery Group 1959–1961 – West Germany
  - 2nd Battalion, 333rd Artillery Regiment
- 209th Field Artillery Group – Fort Sill, Oklahoma
  - 4th Bn, 333rd Artillery Regiment

== Surviving examples ==
Displayed as PGM-11:

- National Air and Space Museum at the Udvar-Hazy Center, Washington, DC
- Warren, New Hampshire
- US Space and Rocket Center, Huntsville, Alabama
- Battleship Memorial Park, Mobile, Alabama
- Air Force Space and Missile Museum, Cape Canaveral, Florida
- Kansas Cosmosphere, Hutchinson, Kansas (payload and aft unit only)
- National Museum of Nuclear Science and History, Albuquerque, New Mexico
- White Sands Missile Range Museum, White Sands, New Mexico
- Evergreen Aviation Museum, McMinnville, Oregon
- Marshall Space Flight Center, Huntsville, Alabama
- US Army Field Artillery Museum, Fort Sill, Oklahoma

== Gallery ==
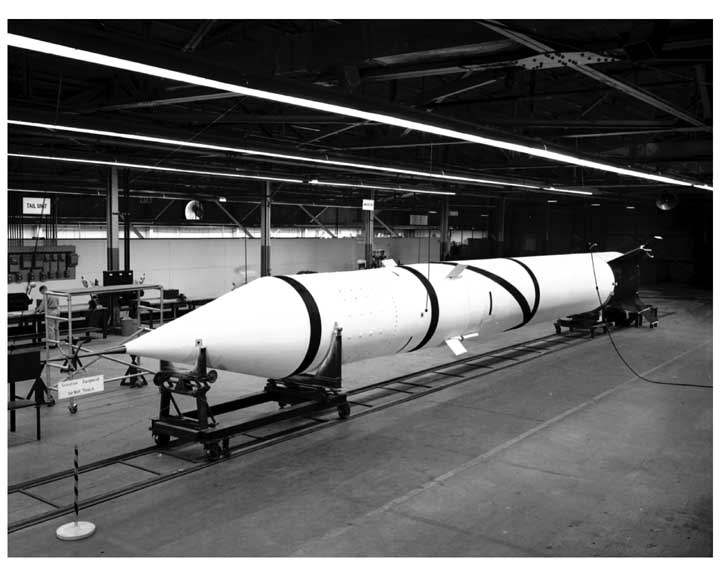
Redstone early production (1953)

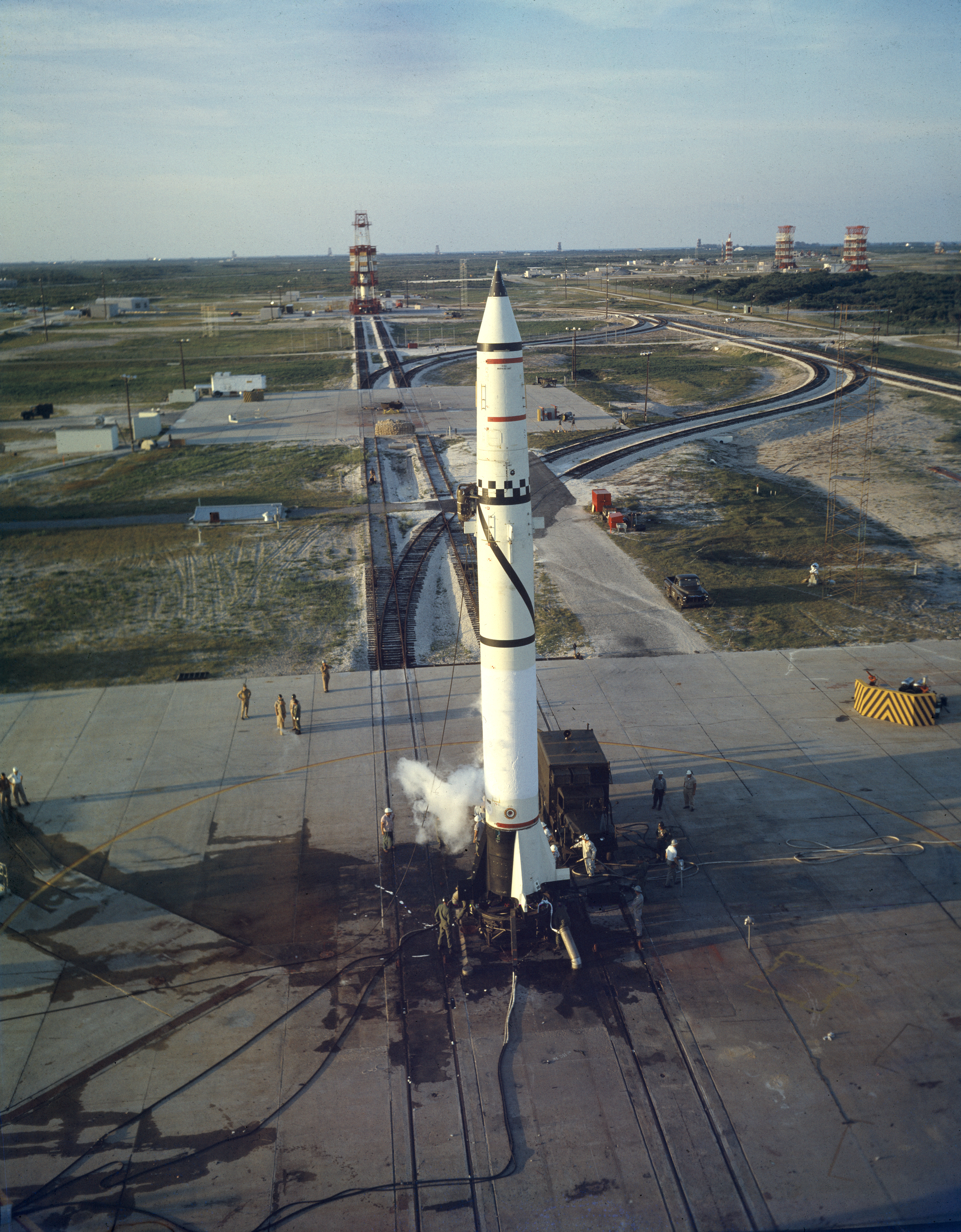
Preparations on 16 May 1958 for the first Redstone launch on 17 May conducted by US Army troops. Battery A, 217th Field Artillery Missile Battalion, 40th Artillery Group (Redstone); Cape Canaveral, Florida; Launch Complex 5

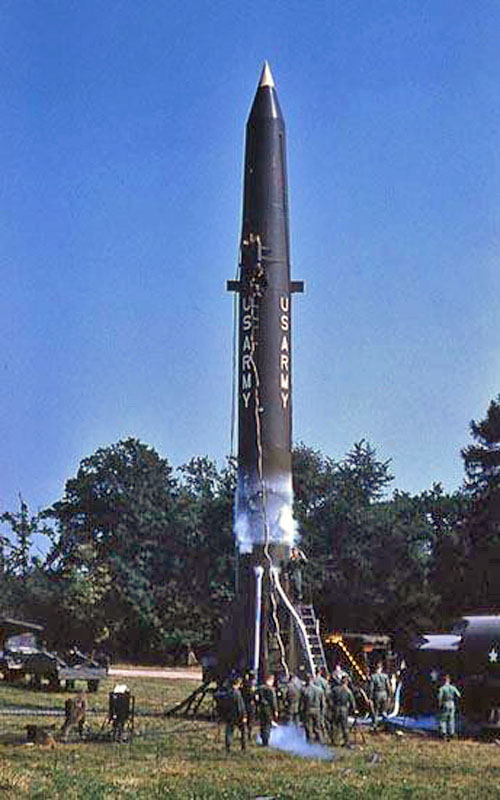
Redstone trainer missile practice firing exercise by US Army troops of Battery A, 1st Missile Battalion, 333rd Artillery, 40th Artillery Group (Redstone); Bad Kreuznach, West Germany; August 1960

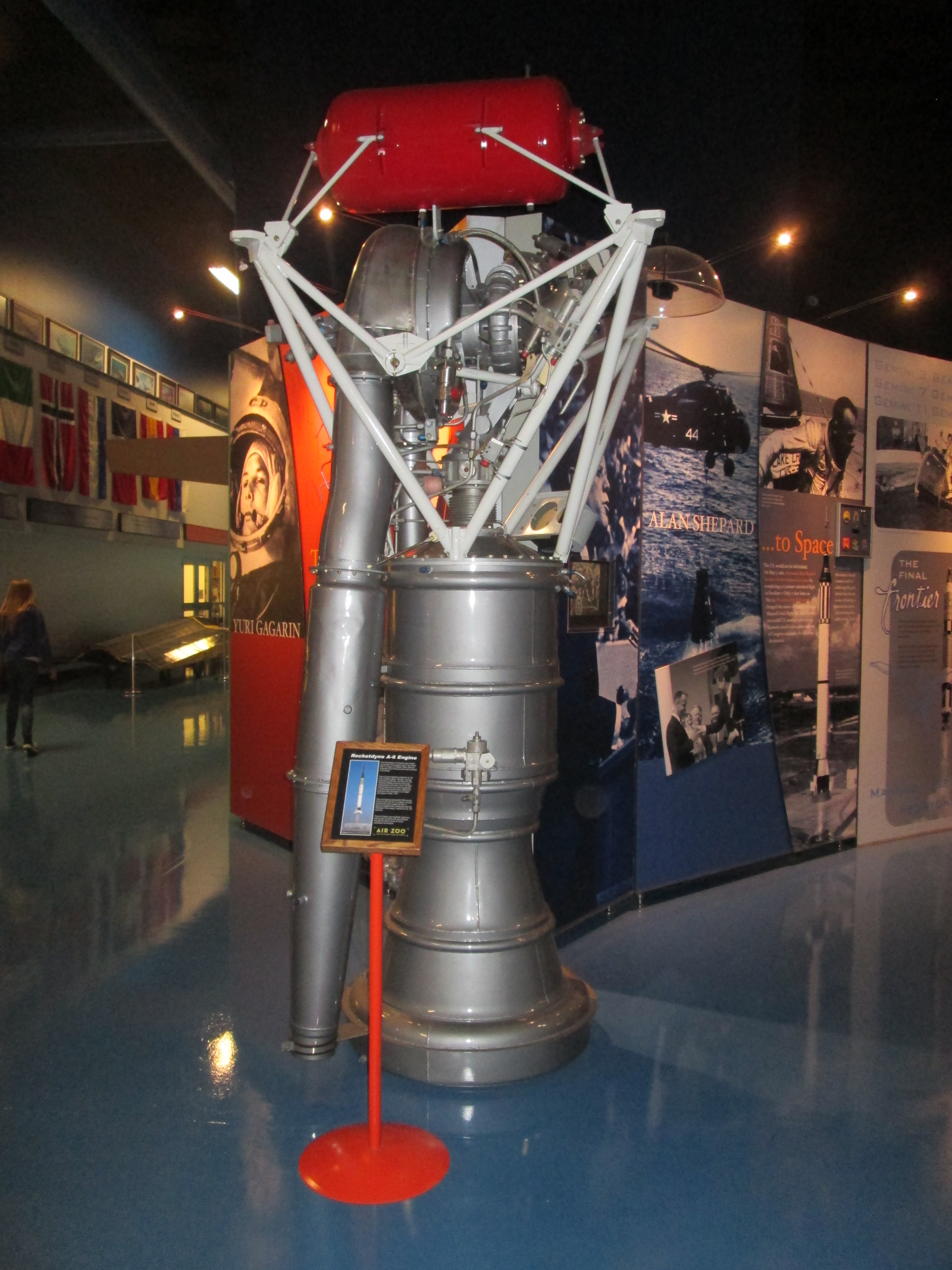
Rocketdyne (NAA) 75-110-A-7 engine

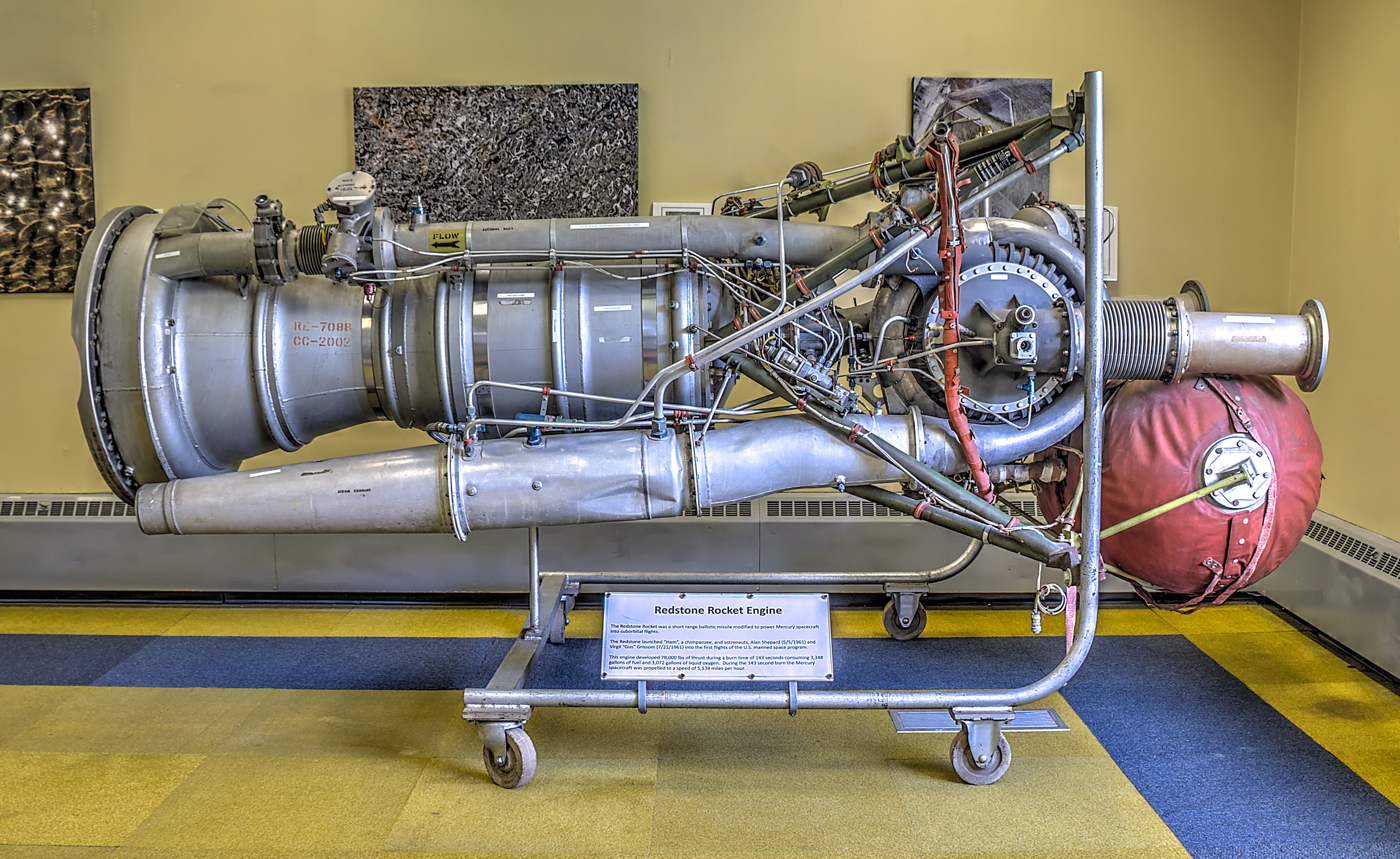
A-7 engine on display

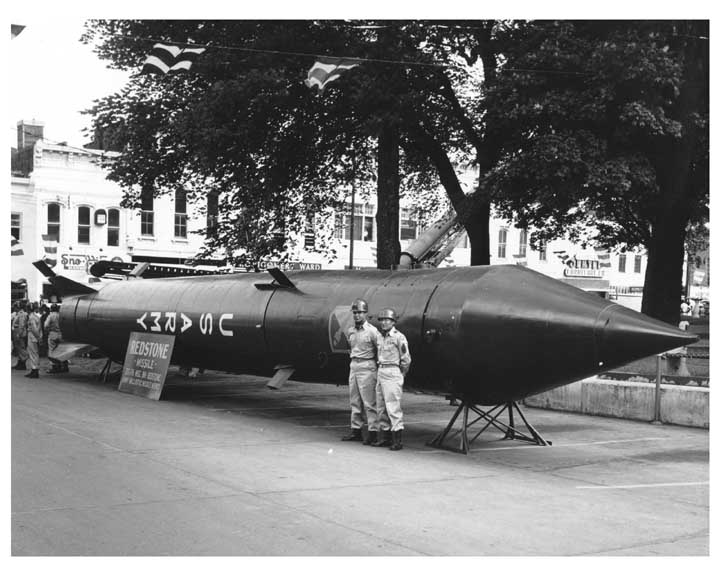
Redstone on display, Pisgah Astronomical Research Institute

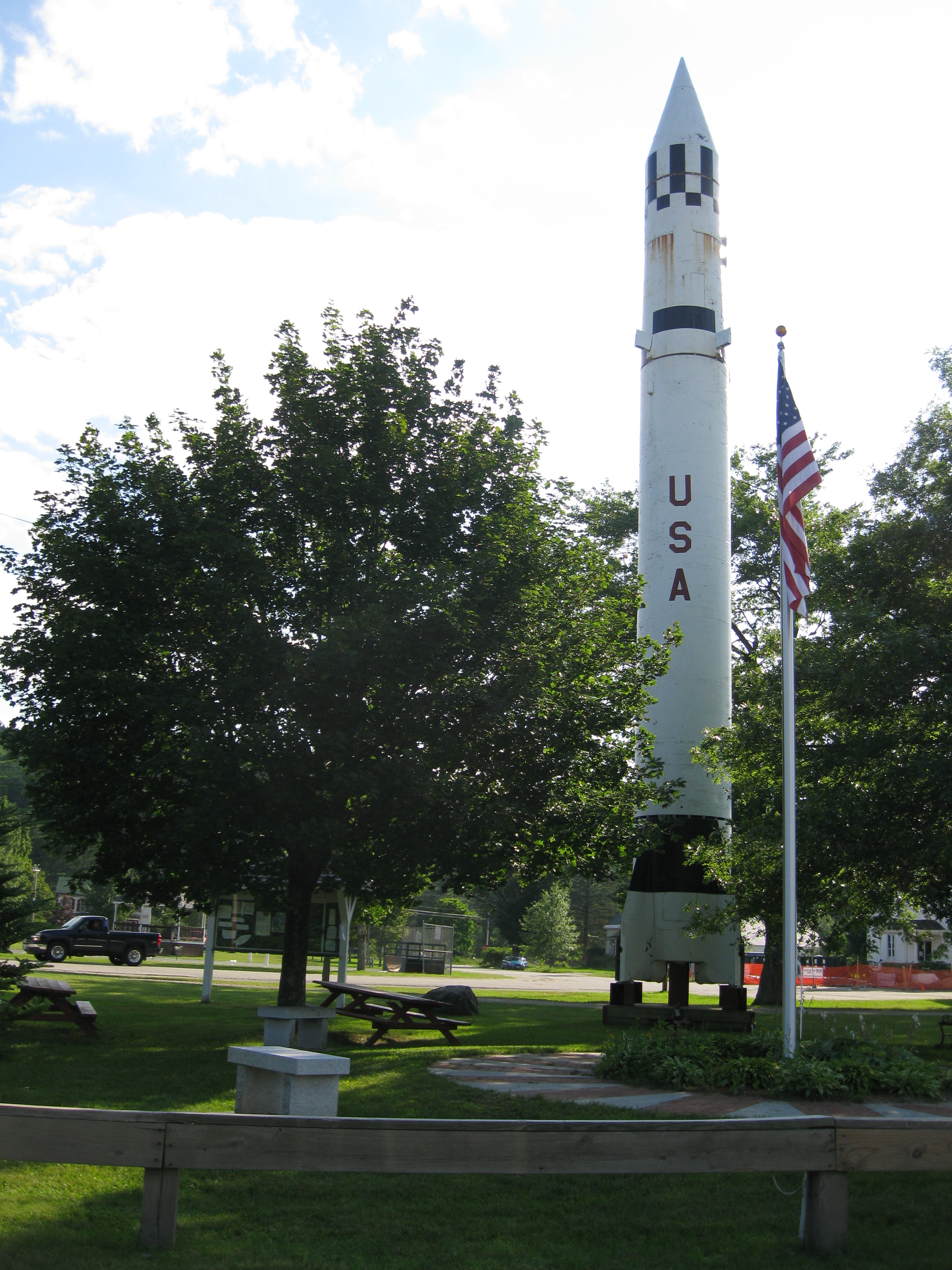
Redstone rocket on display since 1971 at the Warren, New Hampshire Historical Society

National Museum of Nuclear Science & History display in Albuquerque, New Mexico

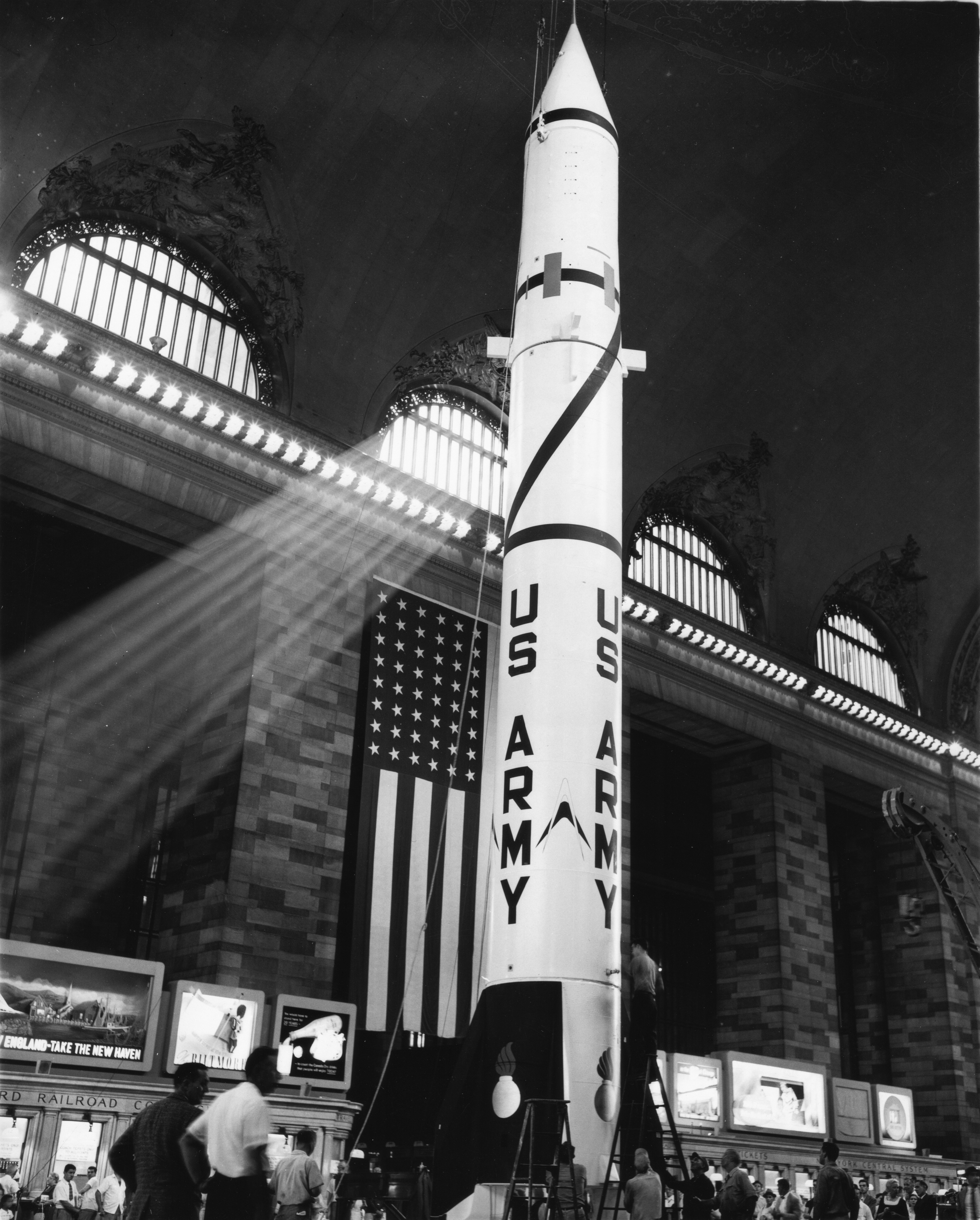
Redstone missile on display in Grand Central Terminal in New York, 7 July 1957

== See also ==
=== Comparable missiles ===
- Ghauri (missile)
- J-600T Yıldırım
- SOM
- Bora
- Fateh-313
- Qiam 1
- Al-Husayn
- Zelzal
- Tondar-69
- Burkan-1

== Bibliography ==
- Bullard, John W (15 October 1965). History of the Redstone Missile System (Historical Monograph Project Number: AMC 23 M). Historical Division, Administrative Office, Army Missile Command.
- The Redstone Missile System. Fort Sill, Oklahoma: United States Army. August 1960. Publication L 619.
- Standing Operating Procedure For Conduct of Redstone Annual Service Practice at White Sands Missile Range New Mexico. Fort Sill, Oklahoma: Headquarters, United States Army Artillery And Missile Center. 31 March 1962.
- Operator, Organizational, And Field Maintenance Manual – Ballistic Guided Missile M8, Ballistic Shell (Field Artillery Guided Missile System Redstone). September 1960. TM 9-1410-350-14/2.
- Field Artillery Missile Redstone. Department of the Army. February 1962. FM 6–35.
- Turnill, Reginald (May 1972). The Observer's Book of Manned Spaceflight. London: Frederick Warne & Co. ISBN 0-7232-1510-3. 48.
- von Braun, Wernher. The Redstone, Jupiter and Juno. Technology and Culture, Vol. 4, No. 4, The History of Rocket Technology (Autumn 1963), pp. 452–465.
