= Athena RTV =

American research missile

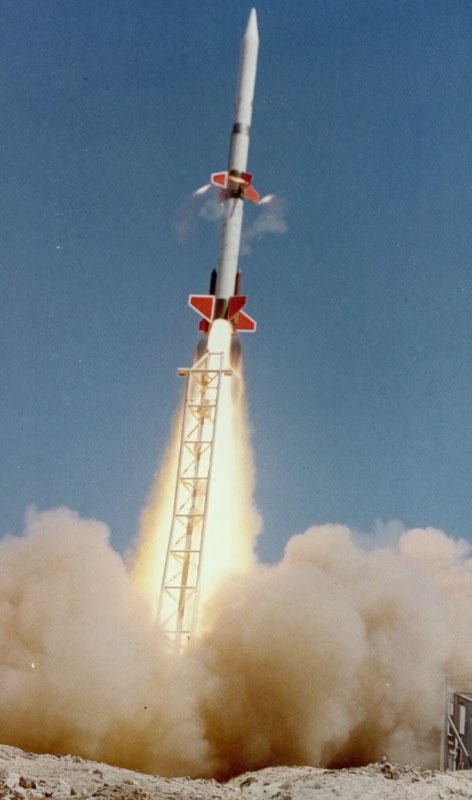
Launch of Athena RTV

The Athena RTV was a research missile, developed by Atlantic Research Co., designed to simulate the re-entry conditions of intercontinental ballistic missiles. It was primarily launched from Green River, targeting White Sands Missile Range in New Mexico, covering a range of 760 km. Later flights from Wallops Island impacted into the sea.

The missile, spin-stabilized, consisted of four stages: the first two lifting the payload to about 200 km, and the third and fourth stages accelerating it to a peak velocity of 6700 m/s on the downward trajectory. Configuration was as follows: two Recruit boosters, one Castor-1 stage, one Pedro (TX-261-3) stage, one Alcor stage and one Alcyone (BE-3B1) stage.

The project began in February 1964 and included launches over nine years, with a total of 141 Athena launched to test re-entry vehicles and study their behavior. By August 1965, 85 flights were completed, and the program ran until 1969. The US Army managed the test range, while the USAF Space and Missile Systems Organization oversaw the program.

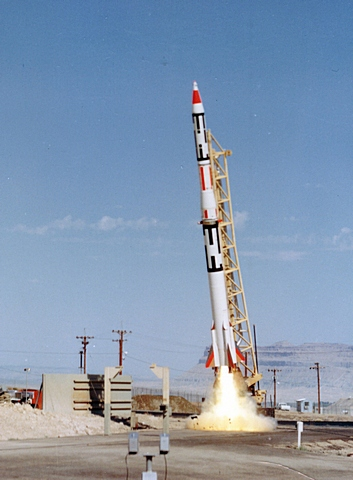
Launch of Athena H

Later, the larger Athena-H variant was developed for continued re-entry testing. It consisted of four Recruit boosters, one Castor-4 stage, one Antares-2 stage and one Alcor-IA stage. Athena-H was launched 18 times between 1971 and 1974 from Green River and Wake Island.
