= AMPTE-IRM =

German satellite of the Explorer program

- Names: AMPTE-Ion Release Module
- Mission type: Magnetosphere research
- Operator: NASA / Germany
- COSPAR ID: 1984-088B
- SATCAT no.: 15200
- Mission duration: 2 years (achieved)

Spacecraft properties
- Spacecraft: AMPTE-IRM
- Spacecraft type: Active Magnetospheric Particle Tracer Explorers (AMPTE)
- Bus: AMPTE-Ion Release Module
- Manufacturer: Max Planck Institute for Extraterrestrial Physics
- Launch mass: 705 kg (1,554 lb)
- Power: 60 watts

Start of mission
- Launch date: 16 August 1984, 14:48 UTC
- Rocket: Delta 3924 (Delta 175)
- Launch site: Cape Canaveral, LC-17A
- Contractor: Douglas Aircraft Company
- Entered service: 16 August 1984

End of mission
- Last contact: 14 August 1986

Orbital parameters
- Reference system: Geocentric orbit
- Regime: Highly elliptical orbit
- Perigee altitude: 1.09 R_{E}
- Apogee altitude: 18.83 R_{E}
- Inclination: 28.60°
- Period: 44.30 hours

Instruments
- 3-D Plasma Analyzer; Ion Release Experiment; Mass Separation Ion Spectrometer (MSIS); Plasma Wave Spectrometer; Suprathermal Energy Ionic Charge Analyzer; Triaxial Fluxgate Magnetometer

AMPTE-IRM, also called as AMPTE Ion Release Module, was a satellite designed and tasked to study the magnetosphere of Earth, being launched as part of the NASA Explorer program, in collaboration with ESA, and the West German Max Planck institute as part of the AMPTE (Active Magnetospheric Particle Tracer Explorers) mission. The AMPTE mission was initiated to study the access of solar wind ions to the magnetosphere, the convective-diffusive transport and energization of magnetospheric particles, and the interactions of plasmas in space.

== Mission ==
The AMPTE-IRM is one of the three components of the international space mission AMPTE, which also included AMPTE-CCE (Charge Composition Explorer), designed by NASA, and AMPTE-UKS (United Kingdom Subsatellite), provided by the United Kingdom.

== Spacecraft ==
The program consisted of three spacecraft: the AMPTE-CCE, which measured in the magnetosphere the ions released by the AMPTE-IRM; and the AMPTE-UKS, which used thrusters to keep station near the AMPTE-IRM to provide two-point local measurements. The AMPTE-IRM provided multiple ion releases in the solar wind, the magnetosheath, and the magnetotail, with in situ diagnostics of each. The AMPTE-IRM spacecraft was spin-stabilized at 15 rpm. Its spin axis was initially in the ecliptic plane, but later it was adjusted with magnetic torquing to be at right angles to the ecliptic. The power system was a 60 watts solar array with redundant batteries. There was a redundant S-band telemetry and telecommand system. Telemetry rates could be chosen between 1 and 8 kbps. For injection into the final orbit, the AMPTE-IRM carried its own kick stage, a BE-3-A9. In addition to the ion releases, the instruments on board the spacecraft monitored the ambient, magnetosphere, but with the data acquisition confined to the passes that could be tracked in real-time from Germany.

== Launch ==
AMPTE-IRM was launched with the two other satellites of the AMPTE program on 16 August 1984, at 16:48 UTC, from a Cape Canaveral launch pad by a Delta 3924 launch vehicle.

== Experiments ==
=== 3-D Plasma Analyzer (30-channel, Electrons: 15 eV-30 keV; Ions: 20 eV/q-40 keV/q) ===
The main instrument consisted of two symmetrical quadrispherical electrostatic analyzers to measure the three-dimensional distributions of electrons and ions, respectively, over 4-pi-sr during every satellite spin period (4 seconds). The energy range covered was 15 eV/Q to 30 keV/Q in 30 channels. The angular resolution was 22.5°. Moments of the measured distributions were directly computed on board. An additional retarding-potential analyzer measured the flux of electrons between approximately 0 and 25 eV.

=== Ion Release Experiment ===
The experiment consisted of eight lithium and eight barium canisters, which were injected from the AMPTE-IRM in pairs by ground command and ignited 10 minutes after separation from the spacecraft. Each of these was either totally lithium or totally barium. A pair of Li/Ba canisters produced a total of 2.E25/7.E24 Li/Ba atoms, respectively, which were subsequently ionized by solar radiation. Li releases in the solar wind, which was carried out in August/September 1984, were to be followed by an artificial comet release of Ba ions in the dawnside magnetosheath and a number of Ba and Li releases in the geomagnetic tail. In situ diagnostics by AMPTE-IRM and AMPTE-UKS and optical observations of the clouds from the ground were followed by tracing of the ions in the inner magnetosphere by AMPTE-CCE.

=== Mass Separation Ion Spectrometer (MSIS) (H through Ba: 0.5 eV/q-14 keV/q) ===
The instrument consisted of a retarding-potential analyzer entrance section and a toroidal electrostatic energy-per-charge analyzer, followed by a quadrispherical electrostatic analyzer with superimposed radial magnetic field for mass-per-charge analysis. The energy range covered was approximately 0 to 12 (or 24) keV/Q, with adequate mass resolution to separate the Li and Ba tracer ions. Up to eight different ion species could be analyzed simultaneously.

=== Plasma Wave Spectrometer (64 channel, E- and B-field, E-: 0.0-5.6 MHz; B-: 30 Hz-1.5 MHz) ===
The instrument used a 42 m (138 ft) tip-to-tip antenna to measure electric fields from DC to 5 MHz and two boom-mounted search coil magnetometers to measure magnetic fields from 30 Hz to 1 MHz. The signals were analyzed by a very low frequency VLF/MF 16-channel spectrum analyzer, three VLF narrow-band swept-frequency receivers, a 60-channel high frequency HF stepped-frequency receiver, and an analog wide-band receiver.

=== Suprathermal Energy Ionic Charge Analyzer (H through Fe: 5-270 keV/q; electrons: 35-207 keV) ===
The main instrument consisted of a curved plate electrostatic energy-per-charge analyzer followed by a 12 cm (4.7 in) time-of-flight telescope with a thin carbon foil at the front and a solid-state detector at the rear, which measured ion velocity and residual energy. The energy-per-charge range was 10 to 300 keV/Q. The mass resolution, delta M/M, ranged from 0.25 to 0.12. The instrument package also contained an electron sensor for the energy range 35 to 220 keV, provided by University of California, Berkeley.

=== Triaxial Fluxgate Magnetometer ===
The instrument was a three-axis fluxgate magnetometer mounted on a 2 m (6 ft 7 in) boom. It had two switchable ranges (± 4 microtesla, and ± 60 microtesla) with resolutions of 0.12 and 1.8 nT, respectively and was read out at 32, 16, 8, or 4 vector samples per second, depending on the T/M rate. Signals from each sensor were also fed into four band pass filters with 5.5, 11, 22, and 44-Hz center frequencies and were read out up to two times per second.

== End of mission ==
The spacecraft became inoperational on 14 August 1986.

== See also ==
- AMPTE-CCE
- AMPTE-UKS
- Explorer program
