= AMPTE-CCE =

NASA satellite of the Explorer program

AMPTE-CEE
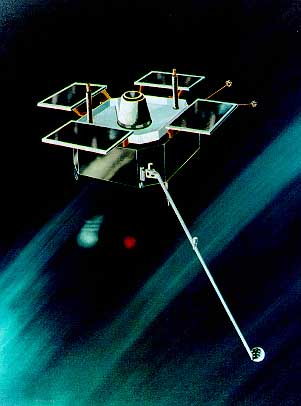
- AMPTE-CCE (Explorer 65) satellite
- Names: Explorer 65; AMPTE-Charge Composition Explorer
- Mission type: Magnetosphere research
- Operator: NASA
- COSPAR ID: 1984-088A
- SATCAT no.: 15199
- Mission duration: 5 years (achieved)

Spacecraft properties
- Spacecraft: Explorer LXV
- Spacecraft type: Active Magnetospheric Particle Tracer Explorers (AMPTE)
- Bus: AMPTE-CEE
- Launch mass: 242 kg (534 lb)
- Power: 140 watts

Start of mission
- Launch date: 16 August 1984, 14:48 UTC
- Rocket: Delta 3924 (Delta 175)
- Launch site: Cape Canaveral, LC-17A
- Contractor: Douglas Aircraft Company
- Entered service: 16 August 1984

End of mission
- Last contact: 12 July 1989

Orbital parameters
- Reference system: Geocentric orbit
- Regime: Highly elliptical orbit
- Perigee altitude: 0.17 R_{E}
- Apogee altitude: 8.79 R_{E}
- Inclination: 4.8°
- Period: 16 hours

Instruments
- CCE Magnetometer (MAG); Charge-Energy-Mass Spectrometer (CHEM); Hot Plasma Composition Experiment (HPCE); Medium Energy Particle Analyzer (MEPA); Plasma Wave Experiment (PWE)

AMPTE-Charge Composition Explorer, also called as AMPTE-CCE or Explorer 65, was a NASA satellite designed and tasked to study the magnetosphere of Earth, being launched as part of the Explorer program. The AMPTE (Active Magnetospheric Particle Tracer Explorers) mission was designed to study the access of solar wind ions to the magnetosphere, the convective-diffusive transport and energization of magnetospheric particles, and the interactions of plasmas in space.

== Mission ==
The AMPTE-CCE is one of the three components of the international space mission AMPTE, which also included AMPTE-IRM (Ion Release Module), designed by Germany, and AMPTE-UKS (United Kingdom Subsatellite), provided by the United Kingdom.

== Spacecraft ==
The mission consisted of three spacecraft: AMPTE-CCE; AMPTE-IRM, which provided multiple ion releases in the solar wind, the magnetosheath, and the magnetotail, with in situ diagnostics of each; and AMPTE-UKS, which uses thrusters to keep station near the AMPTE-IRM to provide two-point local measurements. The AMPTE-CCE (Charge Composition Explorer) spacecraft was instrumented to detect those lithium and barium tracer ions from the AMPTE-IRM releases that were transported into the magnetosphere within the AMPTE-CCE orbit. The spacecraft was spin-stabilized at 10 rpm, with its spin axis in the equatorial plane, and offset from the Earth-Sun line by about 20°. It could adjust attitude control with both magnetic torquing and cold gas thrusters. The AMPTE-CCE used a 2.E8-bit tape recorder and redundant 2.5-watts S-band transponders. The spacecraft battery was charged by a 140-watt solar array.

== Launch ==
AMPTE-CCE was launched with the two other satellites of the AMPTE program on 16 August 1984, at 16:48 UTC, from a Cape Canaveral launch pad by a Delta 3924 launch vehicle. It was placed in an equatorial orbit of 1,100 × 50,000 km (680 × 31,070 mi) with an inclination of 4.8°.

== Instruments ==
Charge Composition Explorer was instrumented to detect those lithium and barium tracer ions from the IRM released that were transported into the magnetosphere within the CCE orbit. The spacecraft was spin-stabilized at 10 rpm, with its spin axis in the equatorial plane, and offset from the Earth-Sun line by about 20°. It could adjust attitude with both magnetic torquing and cold gas thrusters.

The satellite carries 5 scientific instruments that are used to measure the composition of the particles in the magnetosphere throughout their energy spectrum and the changes that affect them with the objective of determining the main processes governing their excitation, their displacement and their disappearance. CCE must also detect the lithium and barium ions released by the MRI satellite and transported in the magnetosphere:

== Experiments ==
=== CCE Magnetometer (MAG) ===
The instrument was a triaxial fluxgate magnetometer mounted on a 2.4 m (7 ft 10 in) boom. It had seven automatically switchable ranges (from ± 16 nT to ± 65,536 nT) with resolution commensurate with a 13-bit analog-to-digital converter, and was read out at 8.6 vector samples/second. The signals from two sensors (one parallel to the spin axis and one orthogonal) were also fed into 5-50 Hz bandpass channels that were read out every 5 seconds.

=== Charge-Energy-Mass Spectrometer (CHEM) ===
The instrument consisted of an entrance collimator and electrostatic analyzer section followed by a time-of-flight and total-energy-measurement section floating at a 30 kV acceleration potential. The energy range covered was from 1 to 300 keV/Q, with a geometric factor of 2.E-3 cm^{2}-sr and 32-sector angular resolution. Energy resolution was 5 to 18%, and all charge states and isotopes of Hydrogen (H) and Helium (He), the charge states of Lithium (Li), and the major elements and charge states up to and including Iron (Fe) were resolved.

=== Hot Plasma Composition Experiment (HPCE) ===
This instrument consisted of an entrance collimator and retarding potential analyzer, a curved-plate electrostatic energy analyzer, and a combined electrostatic-magnetic mass analyzer in series. The energy range covered was approximately 0 to 17 keV/Q, with a geometric factor ranging from 0.01 to 0.05 cm^{2}-sr, an energy resolution from 6 to 60%, and an M/Q resolution of 10%. This instrument cleanly separated Li+ and Ba+ tracer ions from the background. It was nearly identical to one flown on Dynamics Explorer 1 by the same group of investigators. An additional set of eight spectrometers containing permanent bending magnets and channeltrons measured electrons in eight channels from 50 eV to 25 keV.

=== Medium Energy Particle Analyzer (MEPA) ===
The instrument consisted of a collimator and an electron sweeping magnet followed by a 10 cm (3.9 in) time of flight (TOF) telescope with thin foils at the front and midpoint and a solid-state detector at the rear. Incident ion TOF was measured from the front foil to the back detector and from the center foil to the back detector, and energy was measured in the back detector. The dual TOF measurement and very fast energy channel processing gave high immunity to accidental events, and allowed the instrument to measure the composition and spectra of both common species and tracer ions over a species-dependent energy range of >10 keV/nucleon to 6 MeV/nucleon, with a geometric factor of 1.E-2 cm^{2}-sr and 32-sector angular resolution.

=== Plasma Wave Experiment (PWE) ===
The instrument consisted of a balanced electric dipole with an effective length of 70 cm (28 in) and six bandpass channels covering the range from 5 Hz to 178 kHz. The highest five channels were sampled every 0.6 seconds and the lowest (5–50 Hz) channel was sampled every 20 seconds. The instrument was the flight spare of the Pioneer Venus Electric Field Detector, with two additional filters added.

== End of mission ==
The AMPTE-CCE encountered command module/power supply problems since the beginning of 1989 and failed as of 12 July 1989.

== See also ==
- AMPTE-IRM
- AMPTE-UKS
- Explorer program
