= Test Readiness Program =

The Test Readiness Program was a United States Government program established in 1963 to maintain the necessary technologies and infrastructure for the atmospheric testing of nuclear weapons, should the treaty which prohibited such testing be abrogated.

== History of the program ==
=== Events leading to the program ===
From 1958 to 1961, as the world powers negotiated a treaty to ban all testing of nuclear weapons except underground, there was a major push in both the U.S. and the Soviet Union to complete as much development and testing of nuclear weapons as possible before such work was prohibited. Anticipating the upcoming treaty, a moratorium went into effect in 1961 halting all testing. However, in September, 1961, the Soviets broke the moratorium, performing 45 nuclear test events in two months, culminating with a 60-megaton blast on October 30, 1961, the largest at the time. When the Soviets broke the moratorium, the U.S. was not prepared to resume testing, and an immense effort was launched to get the test program back up and running, but even so, it wasn't until April, 1962, that America was able to perform their first post-moratorium tests (Operations Dominic and Fishbowl). Besides the work to prepare and launch the weapon, a tremendous amount of work is needed to prepare and deploy the various scientific data-gathering and analysis systems, so that the test results can be captured and studied.

Following the resumption of Soviet testing, President John F. Kennedy said, "The Soviet Union prepared to test while we were at the table negotiating with them. If they fooled us once, it is their fault, and if they fool us twice, it is our fault."

Once the Limited Test Ban Treaty (LTBT) went into effect in October, 1963, there was concern within the government that it would be abrogated by the Soviets, who would then have a head-start in the resumption of weapons testing. Not wanting to be caught off-guard, the Test Readiness program was initiated, so that if the treaty was nullified, or if some other national security concern warranted the resumption of testing, the scientific infrastructure would be in place so that testing could begin almost immediately. Congressional ratification of the treaty was tied to a mandate to the U.S. Joint Chiefs of Staff to develop a program to maintain American readiness to resume testing if necessary.

== The program ==
In response to the mandate, the U.S. Air Force established a special unit at Kirtland Air Force Base. Sandia National Laboratories was tasked with modifying three aircraft, designated as NC135s, to be used as flying laboratories for analyzing potential future testing, as well as designing all the telemetry that would be used. The aircraft were used by Sandia as well as the Los Alamos National Laboratory and the Lawrence Livermore National Laboratory for the program. Test readiness practice missions were flown by the Air Force, supported by science teams from the three laboratories, sometimes in conjunction with other scientific research missions.

== Ancillary missions ==
=== Airborne astronomy missions ===
While flying simulations for the Test Readiness Program, the science teams assigned to the NC-135 aircraft realized that their flying laboratories could be effectively used to study solar eclipses, cosmic rays entering the atmosphere and the effects of magnetic fields in the ionosphere. Program scientists petitioned the AEC to allow for a program-within-a-program to use the aircraft for such scientific research. The petition was approved, and research continued through 1975.

The first eclipse mission took place from Pago Pago in 1965, and flying in conjunction with several other science aircraft, one of the NC-135s managed to fly within eclipse totality for 160 seconds, providing valuable science data. Eclipse missions were also flown in 1970, 1972, 1973, 1979 and 1980.

== Program ends ==
By 1974, the world politics had significantly changed, and it was clear that the treaty, now over a decade old, would hold and there was little possibility of atmospheric testing would resume. Funding for the program was cut severely. The Air Force support dropped, and President Gerald Ford dropped the word "promptly" from the executive mandate. Thus, the Test Readiness Program came to an end in 1975.

== See also ==
- Strypi
