= Alcor (rocket engine) =

Solid-fuel rocket engine

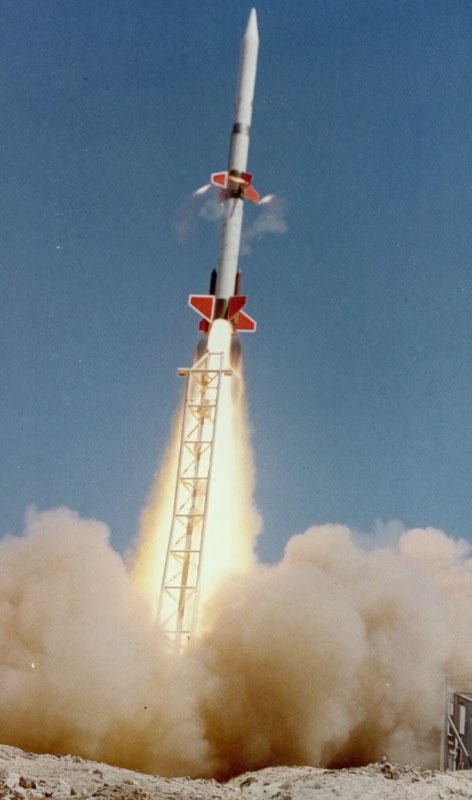
Alcor is the third stage of the Athena sounding rocket

Alcor (also known as Zebra or 30-KS-8000) was a solid rocket engine, originally developed by Aerojet for the US Air Force as the third stage of the Athena test vehicle. Its main appeal was a high mass fraction due to the Aerowrap chamber fabrication process. However, production issues with joint sections limited its use. Alcor engines were used from 1960 to 1977.

The original version was used on a series of rockets: Blue Scout Jr, Blue Scout Junior, Astrobee 200, Blue Scout Jr SLV-1C, RAM B, Blue Scout Jr SLV-1B(m), Athena RTV, Strypi VI and Strypi VIIAR.

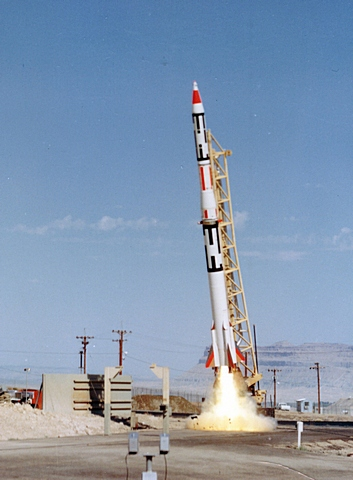
Alcor 1A was used on the Athena H sounding rocket

Initially produced with polyurethane propellant, it transitioned to polybutadiene, leading to the Alcor 1A (23KS-11000) variant. This variant featured improved nozzle, chamber insulation, and expansion ratio, increasing the mass fraction from 0.886 to 0.906. Both Alcor 1 and 1A were used in Astrobee 500 and 1500 vehicles. Alcor 1A was used on the Athena H.

Another improvement occurred late in 1965, with the introduction of an all welded titanium chamber, resulting in the Alcor 1B variant. Alcor 1B was used on the Strypi VIIR.
