= Jupiter-C =

Part of the Redstone rocket family

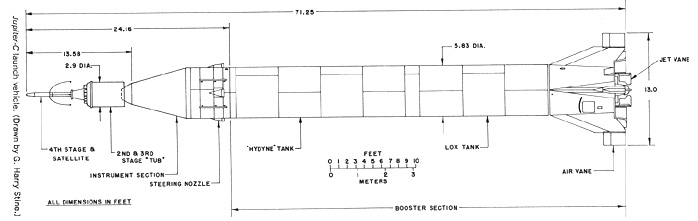
- Jupiter-C diagram
- Function: Sounding rocket
- Manufacturer: Chrysler for the ABMA
- Country of origin: United States

Size
- Height: 69.9 feet (21.3 m)
- Diameter: 5.8 feet (1.8 m)
- Mass: 64,000 pounds (29,000 kg)
- Stages: 3

Capacity

Payload to Sub-orbital
- Mass: 11 kg (24 lb)

Launch history
- Status: Retired
- Launch sites: LC-5 and 6, Cape Canaveral Missile Annex, Florida
- Total launches: 3 (all suborbital)
- Success(es): 3 (suborbital)
- Failure: 0 (suborbital)
- Partial failure: 0 (suborbital)
- First flight: September 20, 1956
- Last flight: August 8, 1957

First stage – Redstone (stretched)
- Powered by: 1 North American Aviation (Rocketdyne) 75-110-A-7
- Maximum thrust: 93,560 lbf; 416.18 kN (42,439 kgf)
- Specific impulse: 235 s (2.30 km/s)
- Burn time: 155 s
- Propellant: LOX/Hydyne

Second stage – Sergeant cluster
- Powered by: 11 Solid
- Maximum thrust: 16,500 lbf; 73.4 kN (7,480 kgf)
- Specific impulse: 214 s (2.10 km/s)
- Burn time: 6 s

Third stage – Sergeant cluster
- Powered by: 3 Solid
- Maximum thrust: 2,040 kgf (4,500 lbf; 20.0 kN)
- Specific impulse: 214 s (2.10 km/s)
- Burn time: 6 s

The Jupiter-C is an American research and development vehicle that was developed from the Jupiter-A. Jupiter-C was used for three uncrewed sub-orbital spaceflights in 1956 and 1957 to test re-entry nosecones that were later to be deployed on the more advanced PGM-19 Jupiter mobile missile. The recovered nosecone was displayed in the Oval Office as part of President Dwight D. Eisenhower's televised speech on November 7, 1957.

A member of the Redstone rocket family, Jupiter-C was designed by the U.S. Army Ballistic Missile Agency (ABMA), under the direction of Wernher von Braun. Three Jupiter-C flights were made. These were followed by satellite launches with the vehicle designated as Juno I (see Juno I below or the Juno I article). All were launched from Cape Canaveral, Florida.

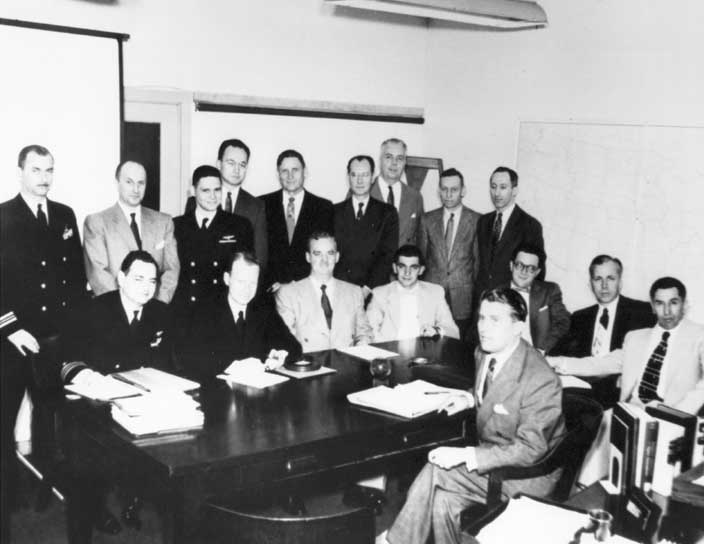
Meeting of the Project Orbiter Committee on 17 March 1955

== Description ==
Each vehicle consisted of a modified Redstone ballistic missile with two solid-propellant upper stages.

The tanks of the Redstone were lengthened by 8 ft (2.4 m) to provide additional propellant. The instrument compartment was also smaller and lighter than the Redstone's. The second and third stages were clustered in a "tub" atop the vehicle.

The second stage was an outer ring of eleven scaled-down Sergeant rocket engines; the third stage was a cluster of three scaled-down Sergeant rockets grouped within. These were held in position by bulkheads and rings and surrounded by a cylindrical outer shell. The webbed base plate of the shell rested on a ball bearing shaft mounted on the first-stage instrument section. Two electric motors spun in the tub at a rate varying from 450 to 750 rpm to compensate for thrust imbalance when the clustered motors fired. The rate of spin was varied by a programmer so that it did not couple with the changing resonance frequency of the first stage during flight.

The upper-stage tub was visibly spun-up before launch. During first-stage flight, the vehicle was guided by a gyro-controlled autopilot controlling both air-vanes and jet vanes on the first stage by means of servos. Following a vertical launch from a simple steel table, the vehicle was programmed so that it was traveling at an angle of 40 degrees from the horizontal at burnout of the first stage, which occurred 157 seconds after launch.

At first-stage burnout, explosive bolts fired and springs separated the instrument section from the first-stage tankage. The instrument section and the spinning tub were slowly tipped to a horizontal position by means of four air jets located at the base of the instrument section. When the apex of the vertical flight occurred after a coasting flight of about 247 seconds, a radio signal from the ground ignited the eleven-rocket cluster of the second stage, separating the tub from the instrument section. The third stage then fired to raise the apogee. Through this system, designed by Wernher von Braun in 1956 for his proposed Project Orbiter, the Jupiter-C obviated the need for a guidance system in the upper stages.

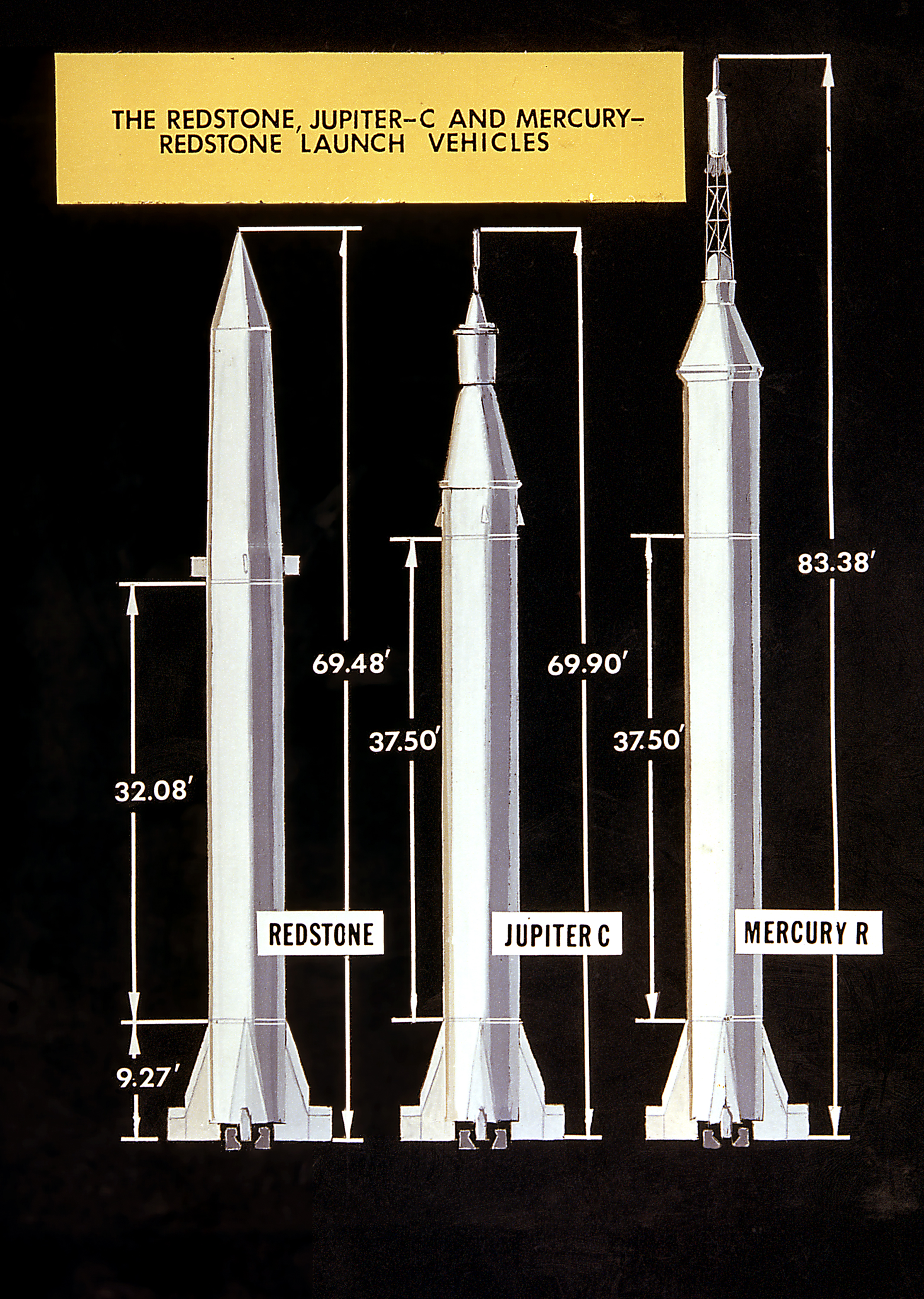
Redstone, Jupiter-C and Mercury-Redstone rockets compared

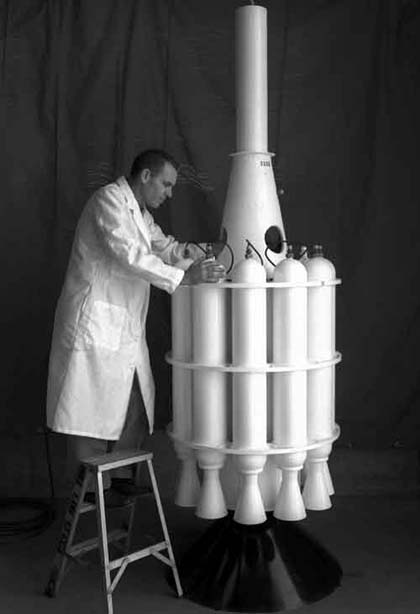
Second stage cluster

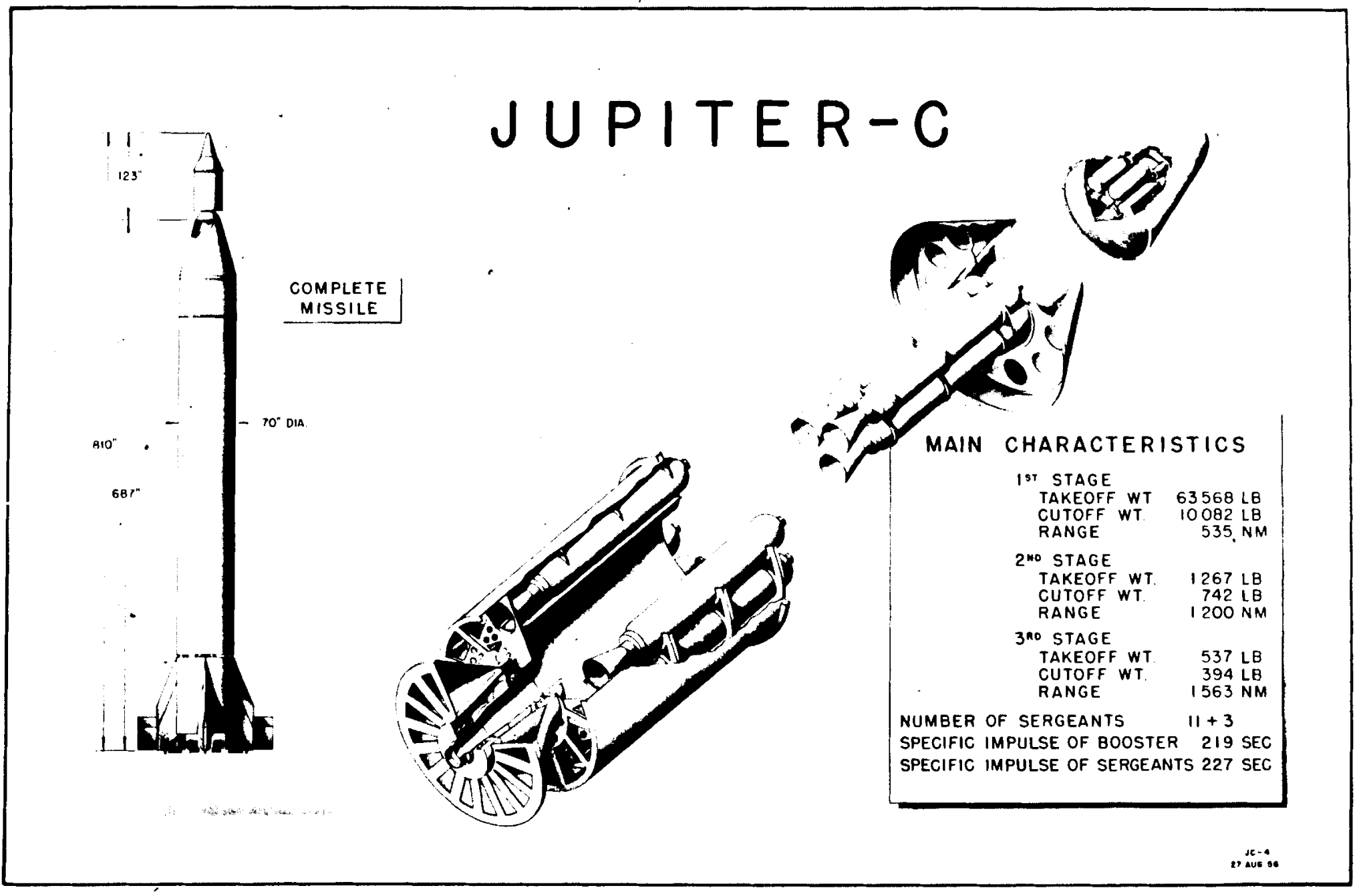
Jupiter C upper stages

== Encrypted serial number ==
The Jupiter-C was part of the IRBM project, and the sequence of manufacture of the rockets (which are not necessarily launched in order, and may be uprated as solutions to technical problems are worked out in tests) was considered a military secret. So the designation painted on the sides of the rocket was not a serial number in clear text, but employed a simple transformation cypher that the staff would be sure not to forget. The key was taken from the name of the design and test base: Huntsville, Alabama, giving HUNTSVILE, with duplicated letters dropped: H was used for 1, U for 2, ..., E for 9 and X for 0. For example, the Jupiter-C / Juno I modified to launch Explorer 1 had "UE" painted on the side, indicating it was S/N 29 (U→2, E→9).

== General characteristics ==
- Weight as configured for Explorer 1 launch, loaded/empty
  - Overall, takeoff: 64,000 lb (29,000 kg)/10,230 lb (4640 kg)
  - Stage 1 62,700 lb (28,400 kg)/9,600 lb (4,400 kg)
  - Stage 2 1,020 lb (460 kg)/490 lb (220 kg)
  - Stage 3 280 lb (130 kg)/140 lb (64 kg)
- Propulsion
  - Stage 1: Rocketdyne A-7 engine
    - Thrust, 83,000 lbf (370 kN)
    - burning time, 155 s
    - specific impulse, 235 s (2.30 kN·s/kg)
    - propellants, liquid oxygen, as oxidizer, and hydyne as fuel
    - propellant feed, turbopump type
    - turbopump drive, 90% hydrogen peroxide decomposed by catalyst bed to produce steam
  - Stage 2: Eleven JPL scaled-down Baby Sergeant rockets
    - Thrust, 16,500 lbf (73 kN)
    - burning time, 6.5 s
    - specific impulse, 220 s (2.16 kN·s/kg)
    - propellant, polysulfide-aluminum and ammonium perchlorate (solid propellant)
  - Stage 3: Three JPL scaled-down Baby Sergeant rockets
    - Thrust, 4,500 lbf (24 kN)
    - burning time, 6.5 s
    - specific impulse, 235 s (2.30 kN·s/kg)
    - propellant, same as for Stage 2

== Flight history ==
Three Jupiter-C flights were made between 1956 and 1957. These were followed by satellite launches with the vehicle designated as Juno I. All were launched from Cape Canaveral, Florida.

Jupiter-C flights
Flight No.	Date	Rocket	Launch site	Payload	Payload mass	Outcome	Comments
1	September 20, 1956	Jupiter-C RS-27 (UI)	LC-5	Microlock Beacon	39.2 kg	Success	Altitude of 1,100 km, speed of 7 km/s, and range of 5,300 km.
2	May 15, 1957	Jupiter-C RS-34 (NT)	LC-6	Ablative nose cone	140 kg	Success	Altitude of 560 km and range of 1,100 km.
3	August 8, 1957	Jupiter-C RS-40 (TX)	LC-6	1/3-scale Jupiter nose cone	23 kg	Success	Altitude of 460 km and range of 2,140 km. First nosecone to be recovered from space.

== Derivatives ==
=== Juno I ===
The Juno I was a satellite launch vehicle based on the Jupiter-C, but with the addition of a fourth stage, atop the "tub" of the third stage and the use of Hydyne as fuel. The Juno name derived from Von Braun wishing to make the satellite launch appear as peaceable as the Vanguard rocket, which was not a weapon, but was developed from a weather study rocket, the Viking. Since the Juno I was the same height as the Jupiter-C (21.2 meters), with the added fourth stage being hidden inside the shell, this vehicle which successfully launched the first orbital satellite of the United States is often incorrectly referred to as a Jupiter-C.

== Gallery ==
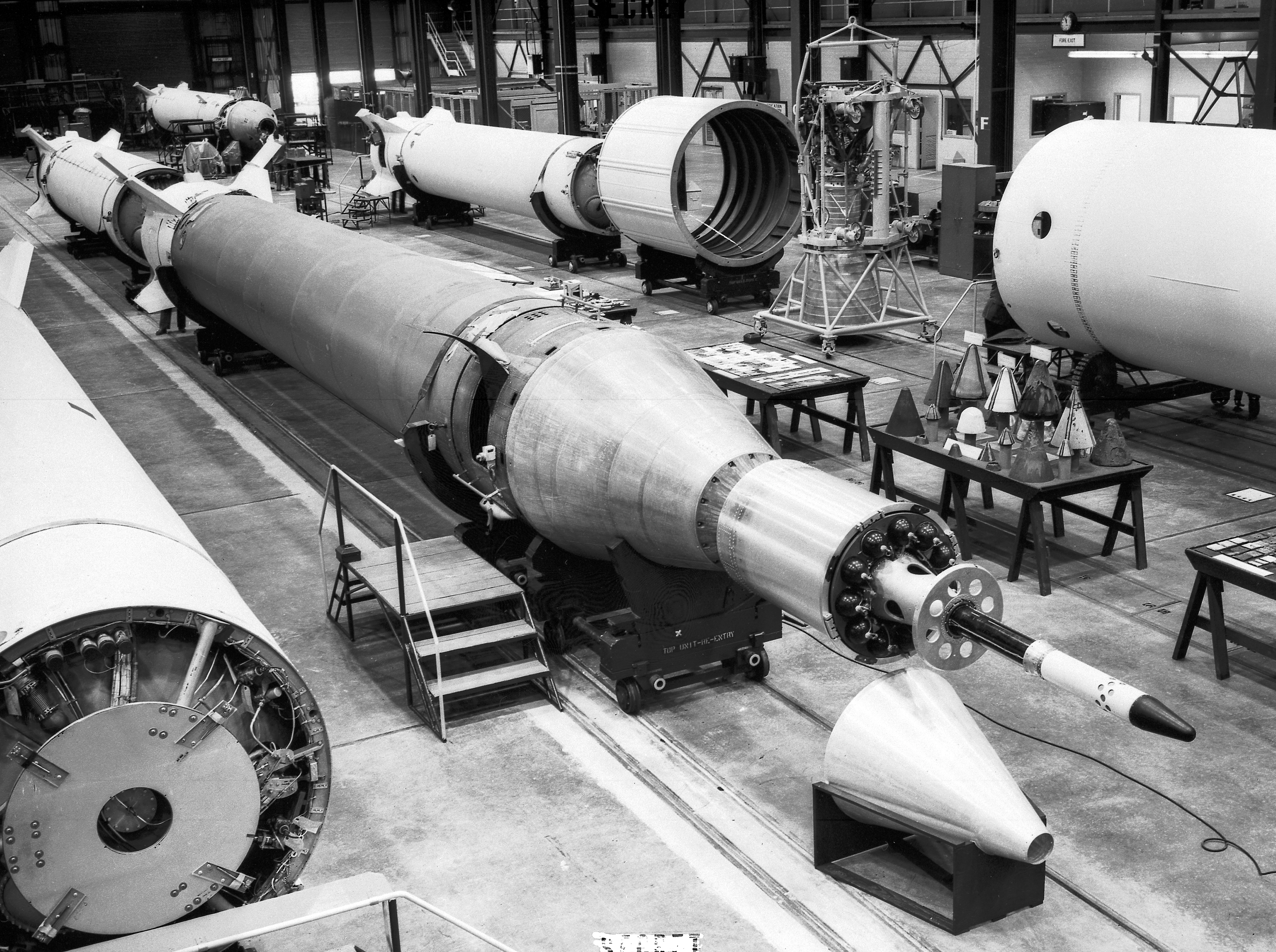
Jupiter-C RS-27 (UI) assembly at the Army Ballistic Missile Agency

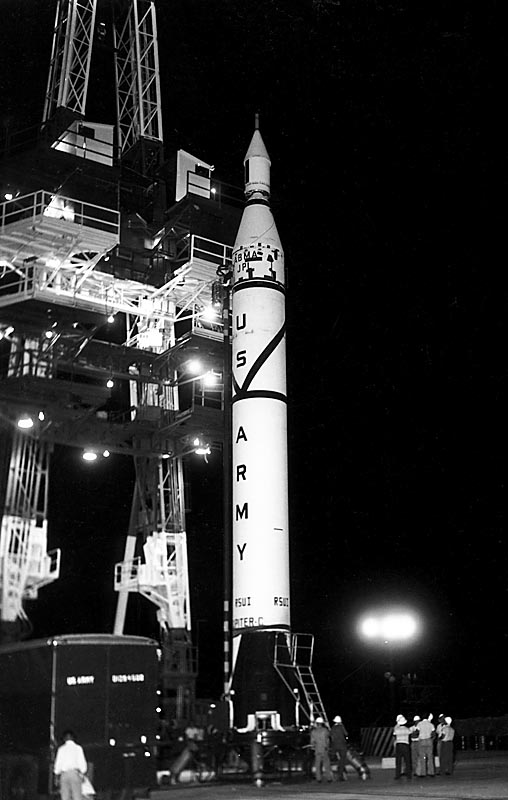
Jupiter-C RS-27 (UI) at LC-6

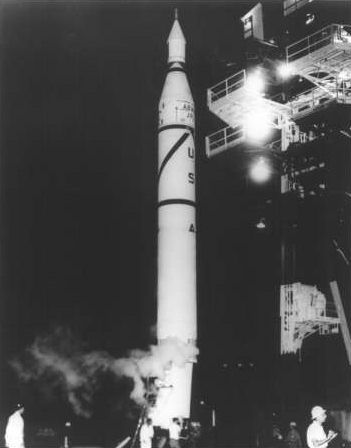
Jupiter-C RS-27 (UI)

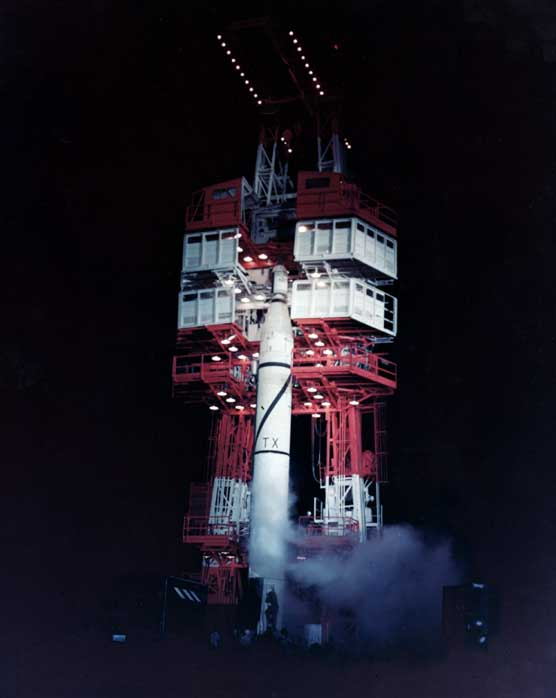
Jupiter-C RS-40 (TX)

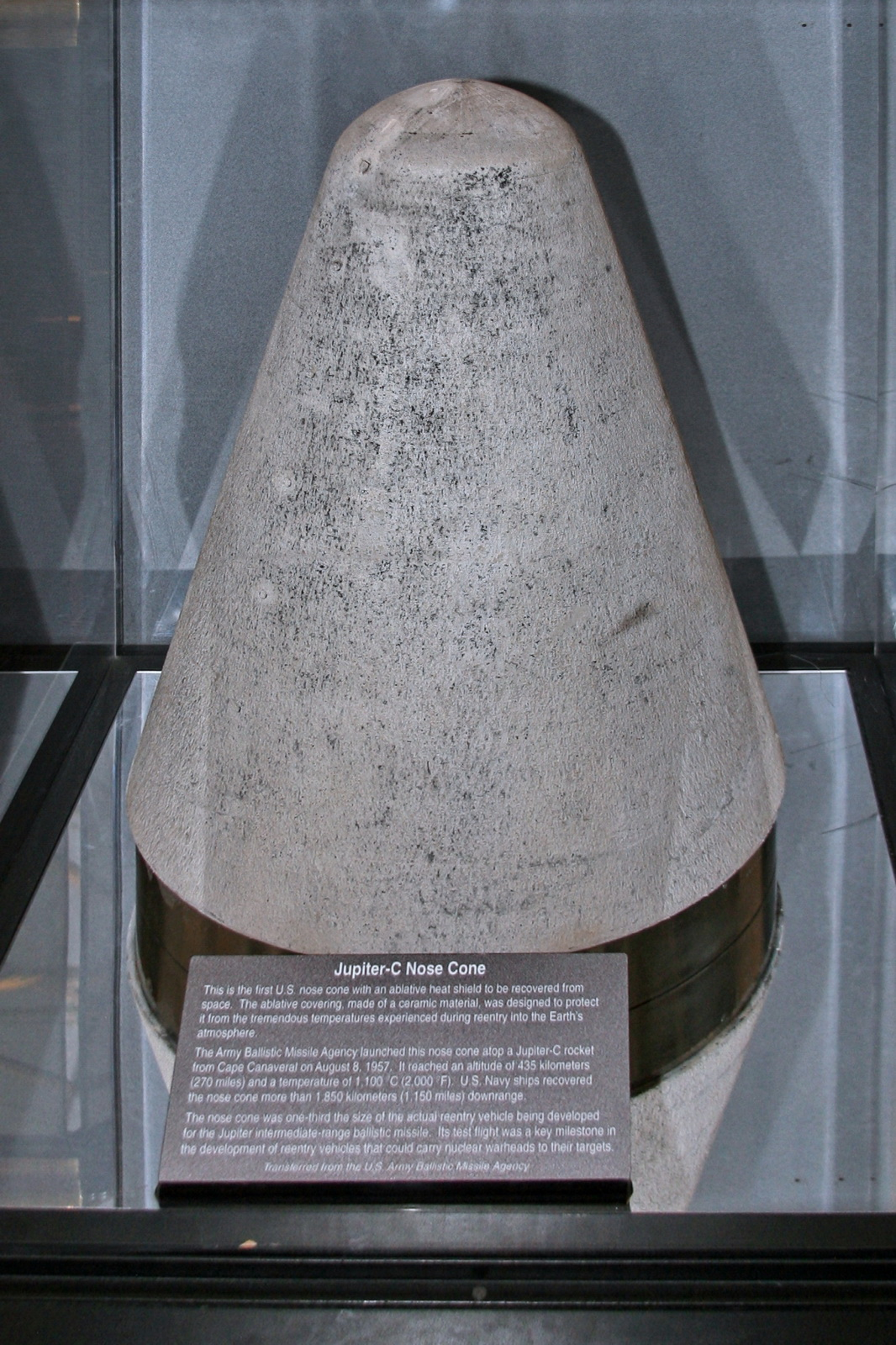
Recovered Jupiter-C RS-40 (TX) nosecone

== On display ==
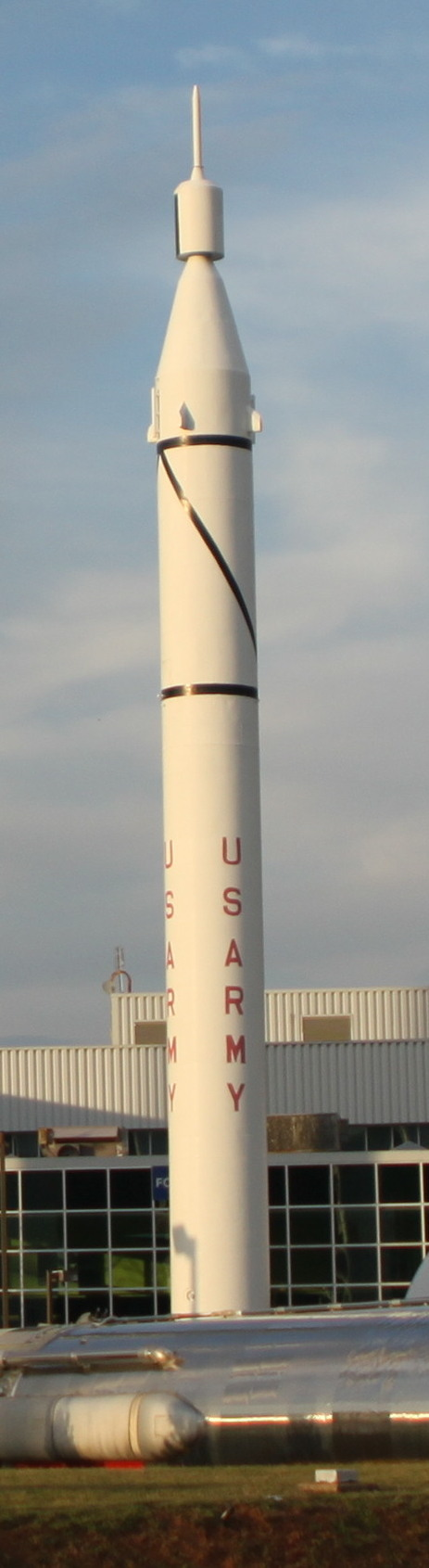
Jupiter-C at US Space and Rocket Center

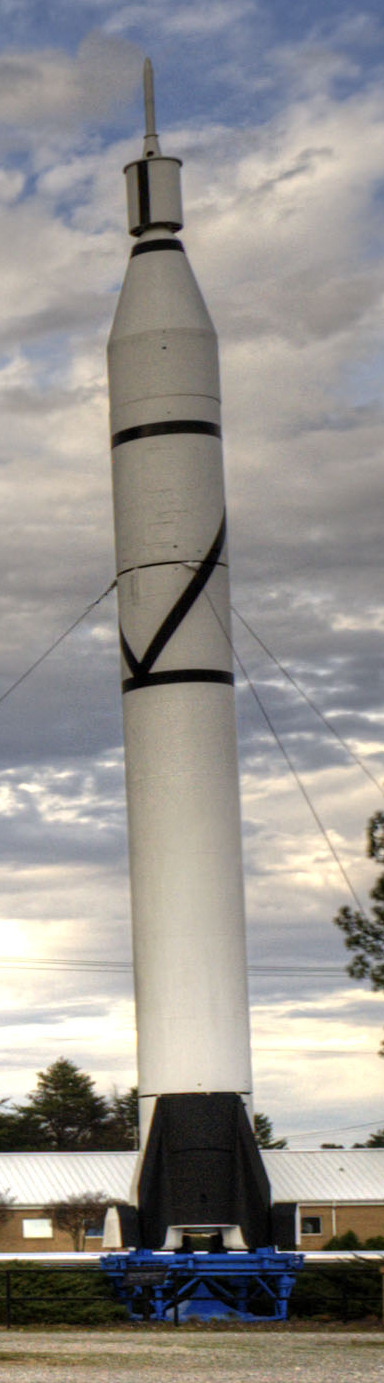
Jupiter-C at the Marshall Space Flight Center rocket garden

Jupiter-C displays:

- US Space and Rocket Center, Huntsville, Alabama, with Explorer 1 mock-up
- Marshall Space Flight Center, Huntsville, Alabama, with Explorer 1 mock-up
- Petal, Mississippi (formerly at John C. Stennis Space Center's StenniSphere, now INFINITY Science Center, not publicly visible)
