= WRESAT =

First Australian satellite

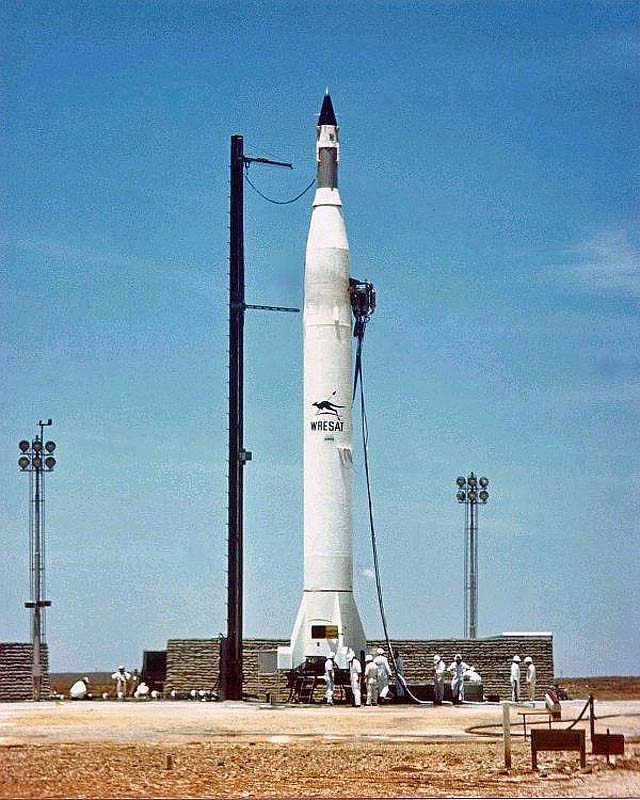
- Redstone Sparta rocket with WRESAT mounted on top (the black cone), c. November, 1967
- COSPAR ID: 1967-118A
- SATCAT no.: 03054
- Mission duration: Data: 73 orbits Total: 642 orbits Total: ~42 days

Spacecraft properties
- Manufacturer: Weapons Research Establishment
- Launch mass: 45 kilograms (99 lb); 72.5 kilograms (160 lb) (with the third stage)

Start of mission
- Launch date: 29 November 1967, 04:49 UTC
- Rocket: Sparta
- Launch site: Woomera LA-8

End of mission
- Decay date: 10 January 1968

Orbital parameters
- Reference system: Geocentric
- Regime: Low Earth
- Perigee altitude: 169 km
- Apogee altitude: 1245 km
- Inclination: 83.3°
- Period: 99 minutes

WRESAT, or Weapons Research Establishment Satellite, was Australia's first satellite. It was named after its designer, the Weapons Research Establishment. WRESAT was launched on 29 November 1967 using a modified American Redstone rocket with two upper stages, known as a Sparta, from the Woomera Test Range in South Australia. The Sparta (left over from the joint Australian-US-UK Sparta program) was donated by the United States.

After this launch, Australia became the seventh nation to have a satellite and the third nation to launch from its own territory, after the Soviet Union and the United States (the UK's, Canada's and Italy's satellites were also launched on American rockets, unlike the French Astérix, which launched on an indigenous rocket out of Algeria).

WRESAT was a cone-shaped satellite weighing 45 kilograms (99 lb), with a length of 1.59 m (5 ft 3 in) and a diameter of 0.76 m (2 ft 6 in). It remained connected to the rocket's third stage and had an overall length of 2.17 m (7 ft 1 in). It carried upper atmospheric radiation measurement experiments designed in the University of Adelaide. The first stage fell into the Simpson Desert, but the second's reentry over the Gulf of Carpentaria was unobserved.

WRESAT, which bore an early forward-bounding kangaroo logo, operated in a nearly polar orbit and reentered the atmosphere over the Atlantic Ocean on 10 January 1968 after 642 revolutions. The battery-operated satellite successfully sent back data to NASA and Australian ground tracking stations during its first 73 revolutions of the Earth.

Today, this achievement is rarely remembered in Australian textbooks or collections of major 20th century news stories and so remains largely unknown to the general Australian populace.

== See also ==
- Timeline of artificial satellites and space probes

== Literature ==
- Morton, Peter (2017). "WRESAT: Australia Joins the Space Club" (PDF). Fire across the desert: Woomera and the Anglo-Australian Joint Project, 1946-1980. Canberra: Defence Science and Technology. pp. 483–496. ISBN 978-0-644-06068-4.
