= Radioflash =

Effect of nuclear explosion

Radioflash is a term used (chiefly in sources from the United Kingdom) in early literature on the phenomena now known more widely as nuclear electromagnetic pulse, or EMP. The term originated in the early 1950s, primarily associated with the "click" typically heard on radio receivers when a nuclear bomb was detonated. It was later discovered that the phenomena was one part of the more wide-ranging set of effects resulting from EMPs after the detonation of a nuclear weapon.

Instrumentation failures observed during nuclear weapons testing between 1951 and 1953 were mentioned in declassified military literature as attributed to "radiated radioflash". A similar term was first used in the Soviet Union in an early theoretical publication (which contained some errors and was later corrected) on the effects of a nuclear explosion.

The term has also been used during the 1970s in high-energy physics in describing a type of collective ion acceleration that would take place during intense solar flares.

== See also ==
- Operation Fishbowl
- Operation Grapple
- Soviet Project K nuclear tests
- Starfish Prime
