= List of artificial radiation belts =

Artificial radiation belts are radiation belts that have been created by high-altitude nuclear explosions.

List of Artificial Radiation Belts
Explosion	Location	Date	Yield (approximate)	Altitude (km)	Nation of Origin
Hardtack Teak	Johnston Island (Pacific)	1958-08-01	3.8 megatons	76.8	United States
Hardtack Orange	Johnston Island (Pacific)	1958-08-12	3.8 megatons	43	United States
Argus I	South Atlantic	1958-08-27	1-2 kilotons	200	United States
Argus II	South Atlantic	1958-08-30	1-2 kilotons	256	United States
Argus III	South Atlantic	1958-09-06	1-2 kilotons	539	United States
Starfish Prime	Johnston Island (Pacific)	1962-07-09	1.4 megatons	400	United States
K-3	Kazakhstan	1962-10-22	300 kilotons	290	USSR
K-4	Kazakhstan	1962-10-28	300 kilotons	150	USSR
K-5	Kazakhstan	1962-11-01	300 kilotons	59	USSR

The table above lists those high-altitude nuclear explosions for which a reference exists in the unclassified English-language scientific literature to persistent artificial radiation belts resulting from the explosion. Of these, the Starfish Prime radiation belt had, by far, the greatest intensity and duration of any of the artificial radiation belts. Within several months of the Starfish detonation, many satellites were rendered nonfunctional. These included the Ariel 1, TRAAC, Transit 4B, Injun I and Telstar 1, and Kosmos 5 satellites. Telstar I lasted the longest of the satellites damaged by the Starfish Prime radiation, with its complete failure occurring on February 21, 1963.

In Los Alamos Scientific Laboratory report LA-6405, Herman Hoerlin gave the following explanation of the history of the original Argus experiment and of how the nuclear detonations led to the development of artificial radiation belts:

Before the discovery of the natural Van Allen belts in 1958, N. C. Christofilos had suggested in October 1957 that many observable geophysical effects could be produced by a nuclear explosion at high altitude in the upper atmosphere. This suggestion was reduced to practice with the sponsorship of the Advanced Research Project Agency (ARPA) of the Department of Defense and under the overall direction of Herbert York, who was then Chief Scientist of ARPA. It required only four months from the time it was decided to proceed with the tests until the first bomb was exploded. The code name of the project was Argus. Three events took place in the South Atlantic. ... Following these events, artificial belts of trapped radiation were observed.

A general description of trapped radiation is as follows. Charged particles move in spirals around magnetic-field lines. The pitch angle (the angle between the direction of the motion of the particle and direction of the field line) has a low value at the equator and increases while the particle moves down a field line in the direction where the magnetic field strength increases. When the pitch angle becomes 90 degrees, the particle must move in the other direction, up the field lines, until the process repeats itself at the other end. The particle is continuously reflected at the two mirror points — it is trapped in the field. Because of the magnetic field gradient and the centrifugal force acting on particles moving around bend field lines, the particles also drift around the earth, electrons towards the east. Thus, they form a shell around the earth similar in shape to the surface formed by a field line rotated around the magnetic dipole axis.

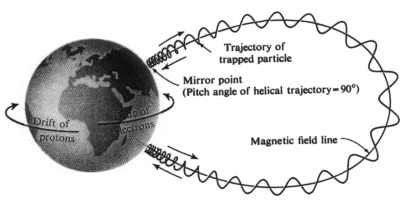
Illustration of the motion of a charged particle trapped in the Earth's magnetic field including its Magnetic mirror point.

In 2010, the United States Defense Threat Reduction Agency issued a report that had been written in support of the United States Commission to Assess the Threat to the United States from Electromagnetic Pulse Attack. The report, entitled "Collateral Damage to Satellites from an EMP Attack," discusses in great detail the historical events that caused artificial radiation belts and their effects on many satellites that were then in orbit. The same report also projects the effects of one or more present-day high-altitude nuclear explosions upon the formation of artificial radiation belts and the probable resulting effects on satellites that are currently in orbit.

== See also ==
- Christofilos effect
- Outer Space Treaty
- Operation Fishbowl
- Lawrence Berkeley National Laboratory
- Lists of environmental topics
- Nicholas Christofilos
