= Operation Fishbowl =

Series of 1960s US high-altitude nuclear tests

- Fishbowl-Tightrope, 10-kilotons (high-altitude burst).

Information
- Country: United States
- Test site: Johnston Island, Johnston Atoll
- Period: 1962
- Number of tests: 11
- Test type: high-altitude rocket (30–80 km), space rocket (> 80 km)
- Max. yield: 1.4 megatonnes of TNT (5.9 PJ)

Test series chronology

Operation Fishbowl was a series of high-altitude nuclear tests in 1962 that were carried out by the United States as a part of the larger Operation Dominic nuclear test program.

== Introduction ==
High Altitude Weapons Effects (1962) Official de-classified AEC information film reel.

The Operation Fishbowl nuclear tests were originally to be completed during the first half of 1962 with three tests named Bluegill, Starfish and Urraca.

The first test attempt was delayed until June. Planning for Operation Fishbowl, as well as many other nuclear tests in the region, began rapidly in response to the sudden Soviet announcement on August 30, 1961, that they were ending a three-year moratorium on nuclear testing. The rapid planning of very complex operations necessitated many changes as the project progressed.

All of the tests were to be launched on missiles from Johnston Island in the Pacific Ocean north of the equator. Johnston Island had already been established as a launch site for United States high-altitude nuclear tests, rather than the other locations in the Pacific Proving Grounds. In 1958, Lewis Strauss, then chairman of the United States Atomic Energy Commission, opposed doing any high-altitude tests at locations that had been used for earlier Pacific nuclear tests. His opposition was motivated by fears that the flash from the nighttime high-altitude detonations might blind civilians who were living on nearby islands. Johnston Island was a remote location, more distant from populated areas than other potential test locations. To protect residents of the Hawaiian Islands from flash blindness or permanent retinal injury from the bright nuclear flash, the nuclear missiles of Operation Fishbowl were launched generally toward the southwest of Johnston Island so that the detonations would be farther from Hawaii.

Urraca was to be a test of about 1 megaton yield at very high altitude (above 1000 km). The proposed Urraca test was always controversial, especially after the damage caused to satellites by the Starfish Prime detonation, as described below. Urraca was finally canceled, and an extensive re-evaluation of the Operation Fishbowl plan was made during an 82-day operations pause after the Bluegill Prime disaster of July 25, 1962, as described below.

A test named Kingfish was added during the early stages of Operation Fishbowl planning. Two low-yield tests, Checkmate and Tightrope, were also added during the project, so the final number of tests in Operation Fishbowl was five. Tightrope was the last atmospheric nuclear test conducted by the United States, as the Limited Test Ban Treaty came into effect shortly thereafter.

== Research directions ==
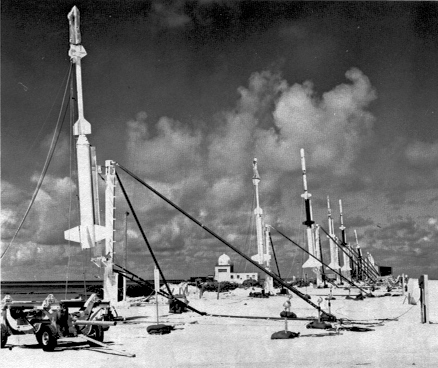
Array of sounding rockets with instruments for making scientific measurements of high-altitude nuclear tests during liftoff preparations on Johnston Island.

The United States completed six high-altitude nuclear tests in 1958, but the high-altitude tests of that year raised a number of questions. According to U.S. Government Report ADA955694 on the first successful test of the Fishbowl series, "Previous high-altitude nuclear tests: Teak, Orange, and Yucca, plus the three ARGUS shots were poorly instrumented and hastily executed. Despite thorough studies of the meager data, present models of these bursts are sketchy and tentative. These models are too uncertain to permit extrapolation to other altitudes and yields with any confidence. Thus there is a strong need, not only for better instrumentation, but for further tests covering a range of altitudes and yields."

There were three phenomena in particular that required further investigation:

1. The electromagnetic pulse generated by a high-altitude nuclear explosion appeared to have very significant differences from the electromagnetic pulse generated by nuclear explosions closer to the surface.
2. The auroras associated with high-altitude nuclear explosions, especially the auroras that appeared almost instantaneously far away from the explosion in the opposite hemisphere, were not clearly understood. The nature of the possible radiation belts that were initially generated along the magnetic field lines connecting the areas of the auroral displays were also poorly understood.
3. Areas of blackout of radio communication needed to be understood in much more detail since that information would be critical for military operations during periods of possible nuclear explosions.

The Fishbowl tests were monitored by a large number of surface and aircraft-based stations in the wide area around the planned detonations and also in the region in the southern hemisphere in the Samoan Islands region, which was known in these tests as the southern conjugate region. Johnston Island is in the northern hemisphere, as were all of the planned Operation Fishbowl nuclear detonation locations. It was known from previous high altitude tests, as well as from theoretical work done in the late 1950s, that high-altitude nuclear tests produce a number of unique geophysical phenomena at the opposite end of the magnetic field line of the Earth's magnetic field.

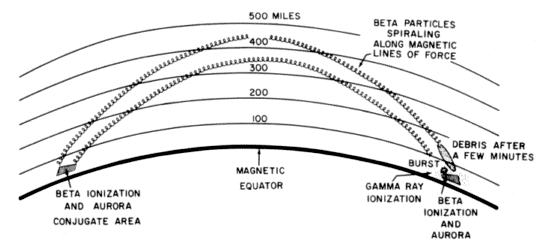
Explanation of magnetic conjugate regions

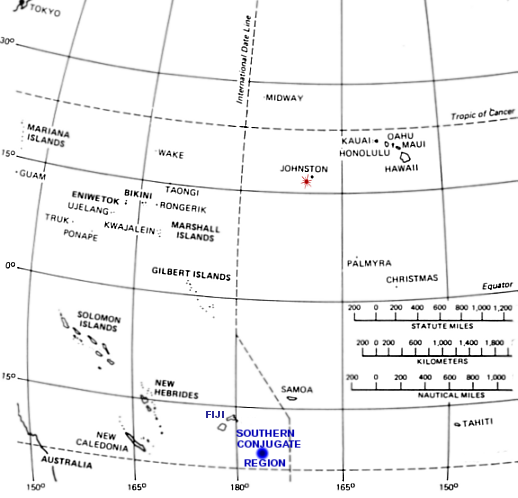
The red burst southwest of Johnston Island indicates the typical detonation point for the Operation Fishbowl tests, and the blue round spot southeast of Fiji indicates the southern magnetic conjugate region where additional auroras were expected and were actually observed. The southern conjugate region is not directly south of the detonation point since the Earth's magnetic field lines do not run in a geographically north–south direction. Also, the magnetic equator of the Earth in this region is slightly to the south of the geographic equator. The detonation point and southern conjugate region were taken from Figure 3 of planning report ADA469481, which was originally a hand-drawn planning map for the Bluegill test. The map shown here actually indicates the detonation point and southern conjugate point for Starfish Prime. The first Bluegill test failed, and the successful Bluegill Triple Prime test detonated at a point closer to Johnston Island.

According to the standard reference book on nuclear weapon effects by the United States Department of Defense, "For the high-altitude tests conducted in 1958 and 1962 in the vicinity of Johnston Island, the charged particles entered the atmosphere in the northern hemisphere between Johnston Island and the main Hawaiian Islands, whereas the conjugate region was in the vicinity of the Samoan, Fiji, and Tonga Islands. It is in these areas that auroras were actually observed, in addition to those in the areas of the nuclear explosions."

Beta particles are charged particles (usually with a negative electrical charge) that are released from nuclear explosions. These particles travel in a spiral along the magnetic field lines in the Earth's magnetic field. The nuclear explosions also release heavier debris ions, which also carry an electrical charge, and which also travel in a spiral along the Earth's magnetic field lines.

The Earth's magnetic field lines arc high above the Earth until they reach the magnetic conjugate area in the opposite hemisphere.

According to the DOD nuclear weapon effects reference, "Because the beta particles have high velocities, the beta auroras in the remote (southern) hemisphere appeared within a fraction of a second of those in the hemisphere where the burst had occurred. The debris ions, however, travel more slowly and so the debris aurora in the remote hemisphere, if it is formed, appears at a somewhat later time. The beta auroras are generally most intense at an altitude of 30 to 60 miles, whereas the intensity of the debris auroras is greatest in the 60 to 125 miles range. Remote conjugate beta auroras can occur if the detonation is above 25 miles, whereas debris auroras appear only if the detonation altitude is in excess of some 200 miles."

Some of the charged particles traveling along the Earth's magnetic field lines cause auroras and other geophysical phenomena in the conjugate areas. Other charged particles are reflected back along the magnetic field lines, where they can persist for long periods of time (up to several months or longer), forming artificial radiation belts.

According to the Operation Fishbowl planning document of November 1961, "Since much valuable data can be obtained from time and spectrum resolved photography, this dictates that the test be performed at nighttime when auroral photographic conditions are best." As with all U.S. Pacific high-altitude nuclear tests, all of the Operation Fishbowl tests were completed at night. This is in contrast to the high-altitude nuclear tests of the Soviet Project K nuclear tests, which were done over the populated land region of central Kazakhstan, and therefore had to be done during the daytime to avoid eyeburn damage to the population from the very bright flash of high-altitude nuclear explosions (as discussed in the introduction to this article).

== First attempts ==
JCS briefing (July 30, 1963) with actual test yields.

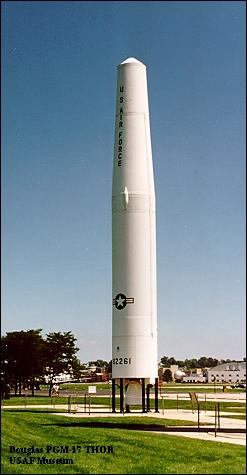
The PGM-17 Thor missile shown here is very similar to the Thor missile used for the launch of the nuclear warhead in all attempts of the Bluegill, Starfish and Kingfish nuclear tests of Operation Fishbowl.

According to the initial plan of Operation Fishbowl, the nuclear tests were to be Bluegill, Starfish and Urraca, in that order. If a test were to fail, the next attempt of the same test would be of the same name plus the word "prime." If Bluegill failed, the next attempt would be Bluegill Prime, and if Bluegill Prime failed, the next attempt would be Bluegill Double Prime, etc.

=== Bluegill ===
The first planned test of Operation Fishbowl was on June 2, 1962, when a nuclear warhead was launched from Johnston Island on a Thor missile just after midnight. Although the Thor missile appeared to be on a normal trajectory, the radar tracking system lost track of the missile. Because of the large number of ships and aircraft in the area, there was no way to predict if the missile was on a safe trajectory, so the range safety officers ordered the missile with its warhead to be destroyed. No nuclear detonation occurred and no data were obtained, but subsequent investigation found that the Thor was actually following the proper flight trajectory.

=== Starfish ===
The second planned test of Operation Fishbowl was on June 19, 1962. The launch of a Thor missile with a nuclear warhead occurred just before midnight from Johnston Island. The Thor missile flew a normal trajectory for 59 seconds; then the rocket engine suddenly stopped, and the missile began to break apart. The range safety officer ordered the destruction of the missile and the warhead. The missile was between 30,000 and 35,000 feet (between 9.1 and 10.7 km) in altitude when it was destroyed.

Some of the missile parts fell on Johnston Island, and a large amount of missile debris fell into the ocean in the vicinity of the island. Navy Explosive Ordnance Disposal and Underwater Demolition Team swimmers recovered approximately 250 pieces of the missile assembly during the next two weeks. Some of the debris was contaminated with plutonium. Nonessential personnel had been evacuated from Johnston Island during the test.

=== Starfish Prime ===
On July 9, 1962, at 09:00:09 Coordinated Universal Time, which was nine seconds after 10 p.m. on July 8, Johnston Island local time, the Starfish Prime test was successfully detonated at an altitude of 400 kilometres (250 mi). The coordinates of the detonation were 16 degrees, 28 minutes North latitude, 169 degrees, 38 minutes West longitude (30 km, or about 18 mi, southwest of Johnston Island). The actual weapon yield was very close to the design yield, which has been described by various sources at different values in the very narrow range of 1.4 to 1.45 megatons (6.0 PJ).

The Thor missile carrying the Starfish Prime warhead actually reached an apogee (maximum height) of about 1100 km (just over 680 miles), and the warhead was detonated on its downward trajectory when it had fallen to the programmed altitude of 400 kilometres (250 mi). The nuclear warhead detonated at 13 minutes and 41 seconds after liftoff of the Thor missile.

Starfish Prime caused an electromagnetic pulse (EMP) which was far larger than expected, so much larger that it drove much of the instrumentation off scale, causing great difficulty in getting accurate measurements. The Starfish Prime electromagnetic pulse also made those effects known to the public by causing electrical damage in Hawaii, about 1,445 kilometres (900 mi) away from the detonation point, knocking out about 300 streetlights, setting off numerous burglar alarms and damaging a telephone company microwave link (the detonation time was nine seconds after 11 p.m. in Hawaii).

A total of 27 sounding rockets were launched from Johnston Island to obtain experimental data from the shot, with the first of the support rockets being launched 2 hours and 45 minutes before the launch of the Thor missile carrying the nuclear warhead. Most of these smaller instrumentation rockets were launched just after the time of the launch of the main Thor missile carrying the warhead. In addition, a large number of rocket-borne instruments were launched from a firing area at Barking Sands, Kauai, in the Hawaiian Islands.

A very large number of United States military ships and aircraft were operating in support of Starfish Prime in the Johnston Island area and across the nearby North Pacific region, including the primary instrumentation ship USAS American Mariner providing measurements conducted by personnel provided by RCA Service Company and Barnes Engineering Company. A few military ships and aircraft were also positioned in the southern conjugate region for the test, which was near the Samoan Islands. In addition, an uninvited observation ship from the Soviet Union was stationed near Johnston Island for the test and another Soviet scientific expeditionary ship was located in the southern conjugate region, permanent features of all future oceanic nuclear testing.

After the Starfish Prime detonation, bright auroras were observed in the detonation area as well as in the southern conjugate region on the other side of the equator from the detonation. According to one of the first technical reports, "The visible phenomena due to the burst were widespread and quite intense; a very large area of the Pacific was illuminated by the auroral phenomena, from far south of the south magnetic conjugate area (Tongatapu) through the burst area to far north of the north conjugate area (French Frigate Shoals). ... At twilight after the burst, resonant scattering of light from lithium and other debris was observed at Johnston and French Frigate Shoals for many days confirming the longtime presence of debris in the atmosphere. An interesting side effect was that the Royal New Zealand Air Force was aided in anti-submarine maneuvers by the light from the bomb."

The Starfish Prime radiation belt persisted at high altitude for many months and damaged the United States satellites Traac, Transit 4B, Injun I and Telstar I, as well as the United Kingdom satellite Ariel. It also damaged the Soviet satellite Kosmos 5. All of these satellites failed completely within several months of the Starfish detonation. There is also evidence that the Starfish Prime radiation belt may have damaged the satellites Explorer 14, Explorer 15 and Relay 1. Telstar I lasted the longest of the satellites that were clearly damaged by the Starfish Prime radiation, with its complete failure occurring on February 21, 1963.

In 2010, the United States Defense Threat Reduction Agency issued a report that had been written in support of the United States Commission to Assess the Threat to the United States from Electromagnetic Pulse Attack. The report, entitled "Collateral Damage to Satellites from an EMP Attack," discusses in great detail the satellite damage caused by the Starfish Prime artificial radiation belts as well as other historical nuclear events that caused artificial radiation belts and their effects on many satellites that were then in orbit. The same report also projects the effects of one or more present-day high altitude nuclear explosions upon the formation of artificial radiation belts and the probable resulting effects on satellites that were in orbit as of the year 2010.

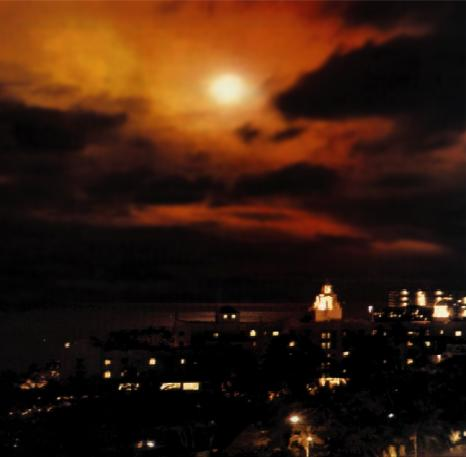
Starfish Prime from Hawaii

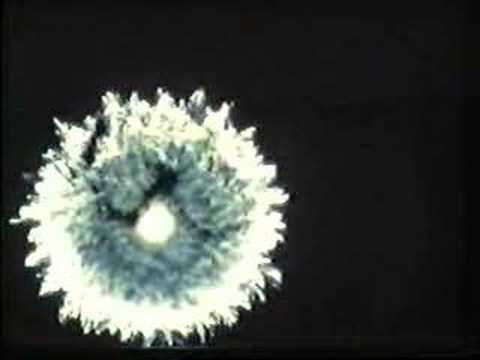
Starfish Prime phenomena: toroidal cloud

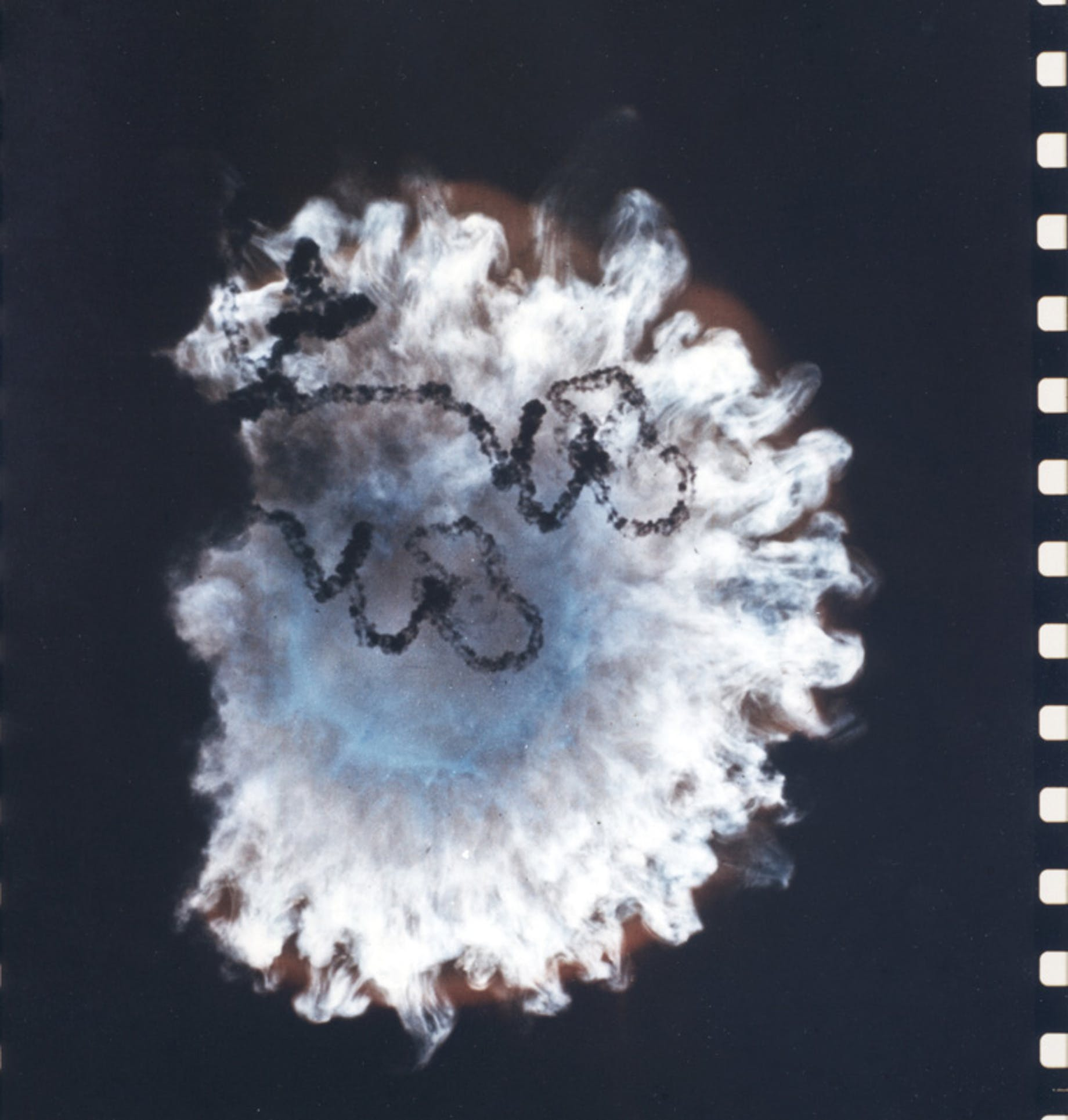
Frame from a 35mm film of the Starfish Prime nuclear test

=== Bluegill Prime ===
On July 25, 1962, a second attempt was made to launch the Bluegill device, but ended in disaster when the Thor suffered a stuck valve preventing the flow of LOX to the combustion chamber. The engine lost thrust and unburned RP-1 spilled down into the hot thrust chamber, igniting and starting a fire around the base of the missile. With the Thor engulfed in flames, the Range Safety Officer sent the destruct command, which split the rocket and ruptured both fuel tanks, completely destroying the missile and badly damaging the launch pad. The warhead charges also exploded asymmetrically and sprayed the area with the moderately radioactive core materials.

Although there was little danger of an accidental nuclear explosion, the destruction of the nuclear warhead on the launch pad caused contamination of the area by alpha-emitting core materials. Burning rocket fuel, flowing through the cable trenches, caused extensive chemical contamination of the trenches and the equipment associated with the cabling in the trenches.

The radioactive contamination on Johnston Island was determined to be a major problem, and it was necessary to decontaminate the entire area before the badly damaged launch pad could be rebuilt.

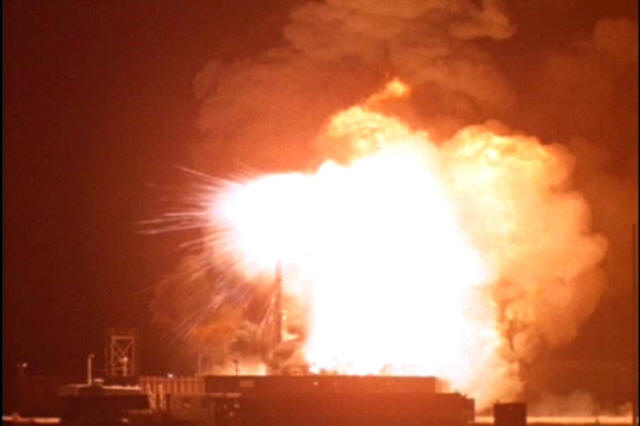
Thor missile launch failure and explosion contaminates Johnston Island with plutonium during the Operation Bluegill Prime

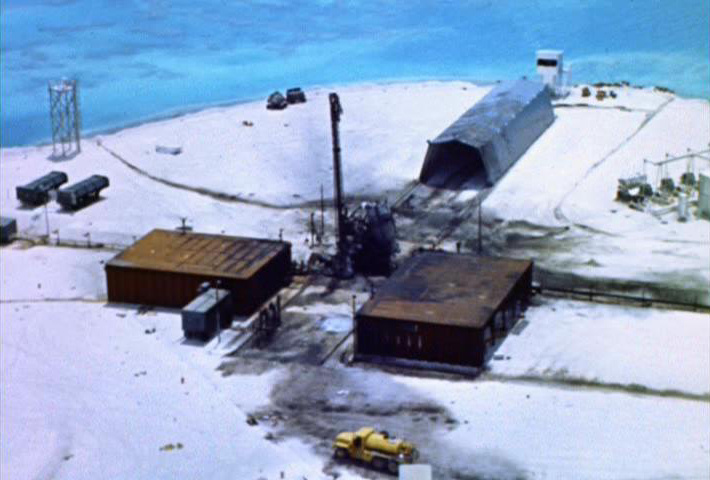
Launch Emplacement 1, contaminated during Thor missile launch failure, Operation Bluegill Prime

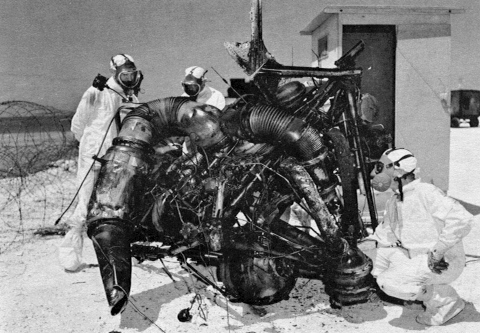
Inspection of Thor engine parts after the radioactive contamination following the Bluegill Prime fire on Johnston Island.

== Operations pause ==
Operation Fishbowl test operations stopped after the disastrous failure of Bluegill Prime, and most of the personnel not directly involved in the radioactive cleanup and launch pad rebuild on Johnston Island returned to their home stations to await the resumption of tests.

According to the Operation Dominic I report, "The enforced pause allowed DOD to replan the remainder of the Fishbowl series. The Urraca event was canceled to avoid further damage to satellites and three new shots were added." A second launch pad was constructed during the operations pause so that Operation Fishbowl could continue in the event of another serious incident.

== Continuation of the Fishbowl series ==
After a pause of nearly three months, Operation Fishbowl was ready to continue, beginning with another attempt at the Bluegill test.

=== Bluegill Double Prime ===
Eighty-two days after the failure of Bluegill Prime, about 30 minutes before midnight on the night of October 15, 1962, local Johnston Island time (October 16 UTC), another attempt was made at the Bluegill test. The Thor missile malfunctioned and began tumbling out of control about 85 seconds after launch, and the range safety officer ordered the destruction of the missile and its nuclear warhead about 95 seconds after launch.

=== Checkmate ===
On October 19, 1962, at about 90 minutes before midnight (local Johnston Island time), an XM-33 Strypi rocket launched a low-yield nuclear warhead which detonated successfully at an altitude of 147 kilometres (91 mi). It was reported that the yield and burst altitude were very close to those desired, but according to most official documents the exact nuclear yield remains classified. It is reported in the open literature as simply being less than 20 kilotons. One report by the U.S. federal government, however, reported the Checkmate test yield as 10 kilotons.

It was reported that, "Observers on Johnston Island saw a green and blue circular region surrounded by a blood-red ring formed overhead that faded in less than one minute. Blue-green streamers and numerous pink striations formed, the latter lasting for 30 minutes. Observers at Samoa saw a white flash, which faded to orange and disappeared in about one minute."

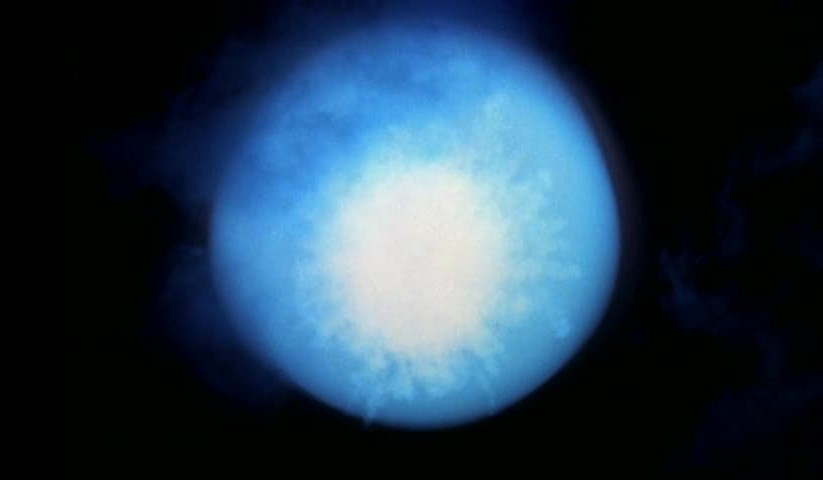
Operation Dominic/Fishbowl - Checkmate shot.

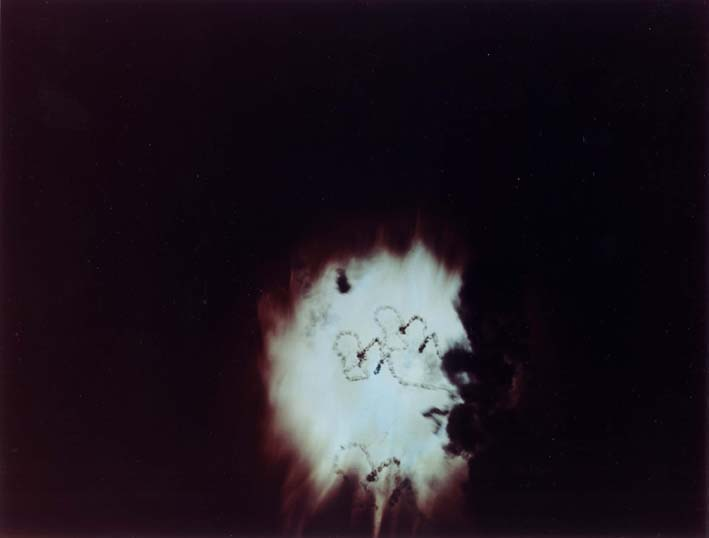
Operation Dominic/Fishbowl - Checkmate shot.

=== Bluegill Triple Prime ===
The fourth attempt at the Bluegill test was launched on a Thor missile on October 25, 1962 (Johnston Island time). It resulted in a successful detonation of a submegaton nuclear warhead at about one minute before midnight, local time (the official Coordinated Universal Time was 0959 on October 26, 1962). It was officially reported as being in the submegaton range (meaning more than 200 kilotons but less than one megaton), and most observers of the U.S. nuclear testing programs believe that the nuclear yield was about 400 kilotons. One report by the U.S. federal government reported the test yield as 200 kilotons.

Since all of the Operation Fishbowl tests were planned to occur during the night, the potential for eyeburn, especially for permanent retinal damage, was an important consideration at all levels of planning. Much research went into the potential eyeburn problem. One of the official reports for the project stated that, for the altitudes planned for the Bluegill, Kingfish and Checkmate tests, "the thermal-pulse durations are of the same order of magnitude or shorter than the natural blink period which, for the average person, is about 150 milliseconds. Furthermore, the atmospheric attenuation is normally much less for a given distance than in the case of sea-level or near-sea-level explosions. Consequently, the eye-damage hazard is more severe."

Two cases of retinal damage did occur with military personnel on Johnston Island during the Bluegill Triple Prime test. Neither individual had his protective goggles in place at the instant of the detonation. One official report stated, "In the first case, acuity for central vision was 20/400 initially, but returned to 20/25 by six months. The second victim was less fortunate, as central vision did not improve beyond 20/60. The lesion diameters were 0.35 and 0.50 mm respectively. Both individuals noted immediate visual disturbances, but neither was incapacitated."

There had been concern that eyeburn problems might occur during the earlier Starfish Prime test, since the countdown was rebroadcast by radio stations in Hawaii, and many civilians would be watching the thermonuclear detonation as it occurred, but no such problems in Hawaii were reported.

=== Kingfish ===
The Kingfish detonation occurred at 0210 (Johnston Island time) on November 1, 1962, and was the fourth successful detonation of the Fishbowl series. It was officially reported only as being a submegaton explosion (meaning in the range of more than 200 kilotons, but less than a megaton), but most independent observers believe that it used the same 400 kiloton warhead as the Bluegill Triple Prime test, although one report by the U.S. federal government reported the test yield as 200 kilotons.

As with the other Fishbowl tests, a number of small rockets with various scientific instrumentation were launched from Johnson Island to monitor the effects of the high-altitude explosion. In the case of the Kingfish test, 29 rockets were launched from Johnston Island in addition to the Thor rocket carrying the nuclear warhead.

According to the official report, at the time of the Kingfish detonation, "Johnston Island observers saw a yellow-white, luminous circle with intense purple streamers for the first minute. Some of the streamers displayed what appeared to be a rapid twisting motion at times. A large pale-green patch appeared somewhat south of the burst and grew, becoming the dominant visible feature after 5 minutes. By H+1 the green had become dull gray, but the feature persisted for 3 hours. At Oahu a bright flash was observed and after about 10 seconds a great white ball appeared to rise slowly out of the sea and was visible for about 9 minutes."

After most of the electromagnetic pulse measurements on Starfish Prime had failed because the EMP was so much larger than expected, extra care was taken to obtain accurate EMP measurements on the Bluegill Triple Prime and Kingfish tests. The EMP mechanism that had been hypothesized before Operation Fishbowl had been conclusively disproven by the Starfish Prime test. Prompt gamma ray output measurements on these later tests were also carefully obtained so that a new theory of the mechanism for high-altitude EMP could be developed and confirmed. That new theory about the generation of nuclear EMP was developed by Los Alamos physicist Conrad Longmire in 1963, and it is the high-altitude nuclear EMP theory that is still used today.

As of the beginning of 2011, the EMP waveforms and prompt gamma radiation outputs for Bluegill Triple Prime and Kingfish remain classified. An unclassified report confirms that these measurements were successfully made and that a subsequent theory (which is the one now used) was developed which describes the mechanism by which the high-altitude EMP is generated. That new theory does give results which are consistent with both the Bluegill Triple Prime and Kingfish data. (The report actually using the Bluegill Triple Prime and Kingfish data to confirm the new EMP theory is the still-classified Part 2 of the unclassified report by Conrad Longmire.)

According to a Sandia National Laboratories report, EMP generated during the Operation Fishbowl tests caused "input circuit troubles in radio receivers during the Starfish and Checkmate bursts; the triggering of surge arresters on an airplane with a trailing-wire antenna during Starfish, Checkmate, and Bluegill; and the Oahu streetlight incident." (The "Oahu streetlight incident" refers to the 300 streetlights in Honolulu extinguished by the Starfish Prime detonation.)

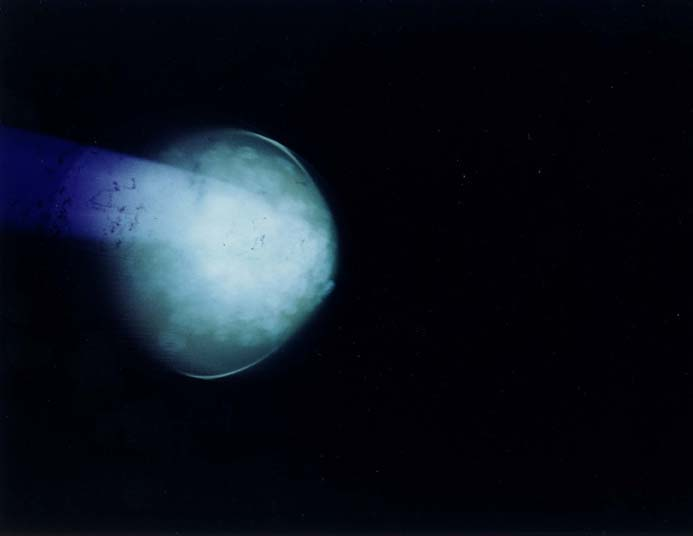
Operation Dominic - shot Kingfish. Detonation altitude: 96300m. Yield: 400kt.

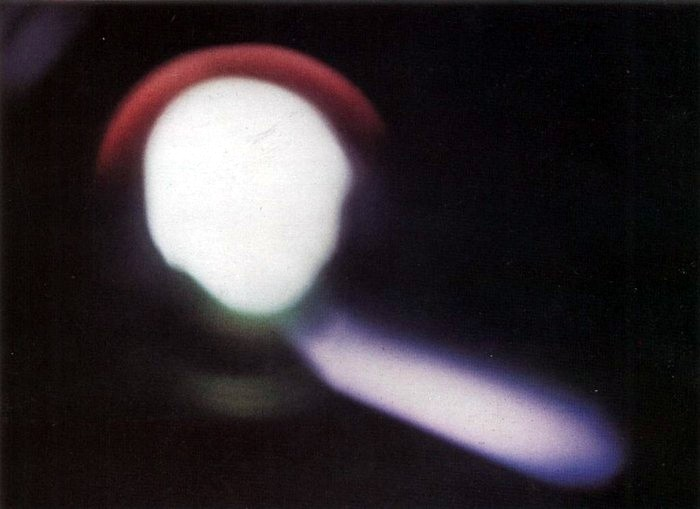
Operation Dominic - shot Kingfish. Detonation altitude: 96300m. Yield: 400kt.

=== Tightrope ===
Fishbowl-Tightrope, 10-kilotons (high-altitude burst).

The final test of Operation Fishbowl was detonated at 2130 (9:30 p.m. local Johnston Island time) on November 3, 1962 (the time and date was officially recorded as 0730 UTC, November 4, 1962). It was launched on a Nike-Hercules missile by Battery B, 2nd Missile Battalion, 52nd Artillery Regiment, and detonated at a lower altitude than the other Fishbowl tests. Although it was officially one of the Operation Fishbowl tests, it is sometimes not listed among high-altitude nuclear tests because of its lower detonation altitude. The nuclear yield was reported in most official documents only as being less than 20 kilotons. One report by the U.S. federal government reported the Tightrope test yield as 10 kilotons.

"At Johnston Island, there was an intense white flash. Even with high-density goggles, the burst was too bright to view, even for a few seconds. A distinct thermal pulse was also felt on the bare skin. A yellow-orange disc was formed, which transformed itself into a purple doughnut. A glowing purple cloud was faintly visible for a few minutes."

Seven rockets carrying scientific instrumentation were launched from Johnston Island in support of the Tightrope test, which was the final atmospheric test conducted by the United States.

== Table ==
United States' Fishbowl series tests and detonations
Name (Note: The US, France and Great Britain have code-named their test events, while the USSR and China did not, and therefore have only test numbers (with some exceptions – Soviet peaceful explosions were named). Word translations into English in parentheses unless the name is a proper noun. A dash followed by a number indicates a member of a salvo event. The US also sometimes named the individual explosions in such a salvo test, which results in "name1 – 1(with name2)". If test is canceled or aborted, then the row data like date and location discloses the intended plans, where known.)	Date time (UT)	Local time zone (Note: To convert the UT time into standard local, add the number of hours in parentheses to the UT time; for local daylight saving time, add one additional hour. If the result is earlier than 00:00, add 24 hours and subtract 1 from the day; if it is 24:00 or later, subtract 24 hours and add 1 to the day. Historical time zone data obtained from the IANA time zone database.)	Location (Note: Rough place name and a latitude/longitude reference; for rocket-carried tests, the launch location is specified before the detonation location, if known. Some locations are extremely accurate; others (like airdrops and space blasts) may be quite inaccurate. "~" indicates a likely pro-forma rough location, shared with other tests in that same area.)	Elevation + height (Note: Elevation is the ground level at the point directly below the explosion relative to sea level; height is the additional distance added or subtracted by tower, balloon, shaft, tunnel, air drop or other contrivance. For rocket bursts the ground level is "N/A". In some cases it is not clear if the height is absolute or relative to ground, for example, Plumbbob/John. No number or units indicates the value is unknown, while "0" means zero. Sorting on this column is by elevation and height added together.)	Delivery (Note: Atmospheric, airdrop, balloon, gun, cruise missile, rocket, surface, tower, and barge are all disallowed by the Partial Nuclear Test Ban Treaty. Sealed shaft and tunnel are underground, and remained useful under the PTBT. Intentional cratering tests are borderline; they occurred under the treaty, were sometimes protested, and generally overlooked if the test was declared to be a peaceful use.) Purpose (Note: Include weapons development, weapon effects, safety test, transport safety test, war, science, joint verification and industrial/peaceful, which may be further broken down.)	Device (Note: Designations for test items where known, "?" indicates some uncertainty about the preceding value, nicknames for particular devices in quotes. This category of information is often not officially disclosed.)	Yield (Note: Estimated energy yield in tons, kilotons, and megatons. A ton of TNT equivalent is defined as 4.184 gigajoules (1 gigacalorie).)	Fallout (Note: Radioactive emission to the atmosphere aside from prompt neutrons, where known. The measured species is only iodine-131 if mentioned, otherwise it is all species. No entry means unknown, probably none if underground and "all" if not; otherwise notation for whether measured on the site only or off the site, where known, and the measured amount of radioactivity released.)	References	Notes
Bluegill (aborted)	June 1962	jamt (–11 hrs); Believed in use during Dominic, Fishbowl, HT I.	Johnston Island, Johnston Atoll ~	N/A +	high alt rocket (30–80 km), weapon effect	W50	unknown yield			First try for Bluegill; RSO had problems before launch, and at 5 minutes tracking was lost. Destroyed at t+15 minutes, before time of intended explosion.
Starfish (aborted)	June 20, 1962	jamt (–11 hrs); Believed in use during Dominic, Fishbowl, HT I.	Johnston Island, Johnston Atoll ~	N/A +	space rocket (> 80 km), weapon effect	W49	unknown yield			First try for Starfish; rocket failed at 59 seconds, destroyed by RSO at 65 secs, weapon single point failed without nuclear reaction.
Starfish Prime	July 9, 1962 09:00:09	jamt (–11 hrs); Believed in use during Dominic, Fishbowl, HT I.	Launch from Johnston Island, Johnston Atoll 16.73365°N 169.52534°W, elv: 3 + 0 m (9.8 + 0.0 ft); Detonation over Johnston Island, Johnston Atoll 16.46842°N 169.63008°W	N/A + 400.1 kilometres (248.6 mi)	space rocket (> 80 km), weapon effect	W49	1.4 megatonnes of TNT (5.9 PJ)			Fishbowl; high altitude effects test, W-49 warhead/Mk-4 RV on Thor missile. Burst seen in Hawaii, Kwajelein (1,600 mi (2,600 km) away), EMP effects in Oahu. Destroyed several satellites, including Telstar I, with radiation belt.
Urraca (canceled)	(original intended date) June 1962	jamt (–11 hrs); Believed in use during Dominic, Fishbowl, HT I.	Johnston Island, Johnston Atoll ~	N/A +	space rocket (> 80 km), weapon effect		unknown yield			Very high altitude Thor-delivered 1 Mt bomb test cancelled for fear of harm to astronauts and satellites.
Bluegill Prime (aborted)	July 1962	jamt (–11 hrs); Believed in use during Dominic, Fishbowl, HT I.	Johnston Island, Johnston Atoll ~	N/A +	high alt rocket (30–80 km), weapon effect	W50	Unknown yield			Second try for Bluegill; a valve in the engine malfunctioned, causing abort launch, and RSO destroyed it in the pad. Complete rebuild of contaminated pad required.
Bluegill Double Prime (aborted)	October 1962	jamt (–11 hrs); Believed in use during Dominic, Fishbowl, HT I.	Johnston Island, Johnston Atoll ~	N/A +	high alt rocket (30–80 km), weapon effect	W50	unknown yield			Third try for Bluegill; booster failure at 86 seconds and rocket started tumbling, RSO destroyed rocket at 156 seconds. Some debris rained on Johnston Island.
Checkmate	October 20, 1962 08:30:00	jamt (–11 hrs); Believed in use during Dominic, Fishbowl, HT I.	Launch from Johnston Island, Johnston Atoll 16.73365°N 169.52534°W, elv: 3 + 0 m (9.8 + 0.0 ft); Detonation over Johnston Island, Johnston Atoll 16.07239°N 169.60997°W	N/A + 147.3 kilometres (91.5 mi)	space rocket (> 80 km), weapon effect	XW50X1, (-Y1 ?)	10 kilotonnes of TNT (42 TJ)			High altitude effects shot, XM-33 Strypi rocket with Recruit booster.
Bluegill Triple Prime	October 26, 1962 09:59:48	jamt (–11 hrs); Believed in use during Dominic, Fishbowl, HT I.	Launch from Johnston Island, Johnston Atoll 16.73365°N 169.52534°W, elv: 3 + 0 m (9.8 + 0.0 ft); Detonation over Johnston Island, Johnston Atoll 16.41583°N 169.60311°W	N/A + 48.32 kilometres (30.02 mi)	high alt rocket (30–80 km), weapon effect	W50	200 kilotonnes of TNT (840 TJ)			4th attempt. Thor missile launched successfully, similar to Adobe, Aztec, Kingfish. Little EMP recorded. Two military suffered eye injuries.
Kingfish	November 1, 1962 12:10:06	jamt (–11 hrs); Believed in use during Dominic, Fishbowl, HT I.	Launch from Johnston Island, Johnston Atoll 16.73365°N 169.52534°W, elv: 3 + 0 m (9.8 + 0.0 ft); Detonation over Johnston Island, Johnston Atoll 16.1135°N 169.6822°W	N/A + 97.24 kilometres (60.42 mi)	space rocket (> 80 km), weapon effect	W50, -Y2 or Y3	200 kilotonnes of TNT (840 TJ)			Thor missile launched, similar to Adobe, Aztec, Bluegill Triple Prime. Viewed all over central Pacific, 3 hours ionospheric interference.
Tightrope	November 4, 1962 07:30:00	jamt (–11 hrs); Believed in use during Dominic, Fishbowl, HT I.	Launch from Johnston Island, Johnston Atoll 16.73365°N 169.52534°W, elv: 3 + 0 m (9.8 + 0.0 ft); Detonation over Johnston Island, Johnston Atoll 16.70742°N 169.54242°W	N/A + 21.03 kilometres (13.07 mi)	high alt rocket (30–80 km), weapon effect	W31	10 kilotonnes of TNT (42 TJ)			Air defense warhead on Nike Hercules missile, last U.S. atmospheric test, test of missile defense system, successful. Last true US "atmospheric" test before PTBT.

== See also ==
- Electromagnetism
- Geomagnetic storm
