= High-altitude nuclear explosion =

Nuclear detonations in the upper layers of Earth's atmosphere

Hardtack-Teak, 3.88 megatons of TNT (16.2 PJ). Deployment via PGM-11 Redstone.

High-altitude nuclear explosions are the result of nuclear weapons testing within the upper layers of the Earth's atmosphere and in outer space. Several such tests were performed at high altitudes by the United States and the Soviet Union between 1958 and 1962.

The Partial Test Ban Treaty was passed in October 1963, ending atmospheric and exoatmospheric nuclear tests. The Outer Space Treaty of 1967 banned the stationing of nuclear weapons in space, in addition to other weapons of mass destruction. The Comprehensive Nuclear-Test-Ban Treaty of 1996 prohibits all nuclear testing; whether over- or underground, underwater or in the atmosphere, but has yet to enter into force as it has been ratified by some of the states party to the Treaty.

== EMP generation ==
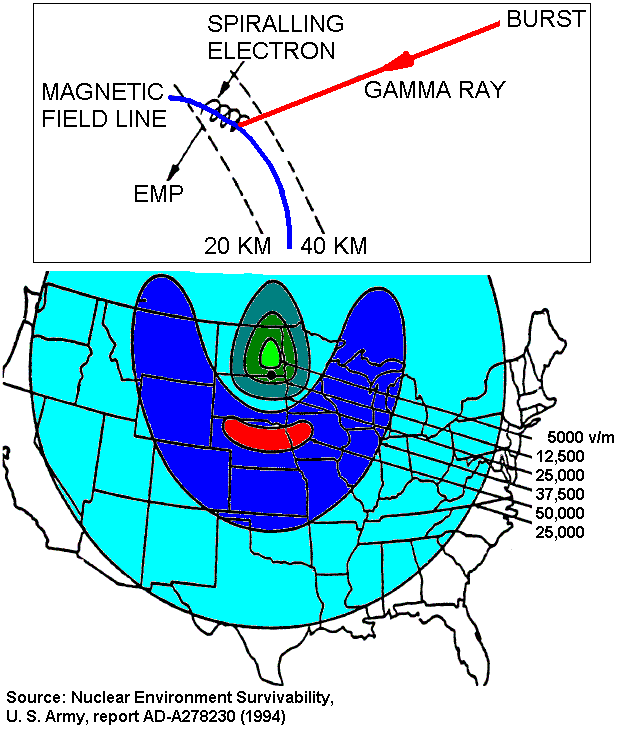
The mechanism for a 400 kilometres (250 mi) high-altitude burst EMP: gamma rays hit the atmosphere between 20 and 40 kilometres (12 and 25 mi) altitude, ejecting electrons that are then deflected sideways by the Earth's magnetic field.

The strong electromagnetic pulse (EMP) that results has several components. In the first few tenths of nanoseconds, about a tenth of a percent of the weapon yield appears as powerful gamma rays with energies of one to three mega-electron volts (MeV, a unit of energy). The gamma rays penetrate the atmosphere and collide with air molecules, depositing their energy to produce huge quantities of positive ions and recoil electrons (also known as Compton electrons). These MeV-energy Compton electrons then accelerate and spiral along the Earth's magnetic field lines. The resulting transient electric fields and currents generate electromagnetic emissions in the radio frequency range of 15 MHz to 250 MHz. This high-altitude EMP occurs between 30 and 50 kilometers (19 and 31 miles) above the Earth's surface. The potential as an anti-satellite weapon became apparent in August 1958 during Hardtack Teak. The EMP observed at the Apia Observatory at Samoa was four times more powerful than any created by solar storms, while in July 1962 the Starfish Prime test damaged electronics in Honolulu and New Zealand (approximately 1,300 kilometres (810 mi) away), fused 300 street lights on Oahu (Hawaii), set off about 100 burglar alarms, and caused the failure of a microwave repeating station on Kauai, which cut off the sturdy telephone system from the other Hawaiian islands. The radius for an effective satellite kill for the Compton radiation produced by such a nuclear weapon in space was determined to be roughly 80 kilometres (50 mi). Further testing to this end was carried out, and embodied in a Department of Defense program, Program 437.

== Drawbacks ==
High Altitude Weapons Effects (1962) Official de-classified AEC information film reel.

There are problems with nuclear weapons carried over to testing and deployment scenarios, however. Because of the very large radius associated with nuclear events, it was nearly impossible to prevent indiscriminate damage to other satellites, including one's own satellites. Starfish Prime produced an artificial radiation belt in space that soon destroyed three satellites (Ariel, TRAAC, and Transit 4B all failed after traversing the radiation belt, while Cosmos V, Injun I and Telstar 1 suffered minor degradation, due to some radiation damage to solar cells, etc.). The radiation dose rate was at least 0.6 Gy/day at four months after Starfish for a well-shielded satellite or crewed capsule in a polar circular earth orbit, which caused NASA concern with regard to its crewed space exploration programs.

== Differences from atmospheric tests ==
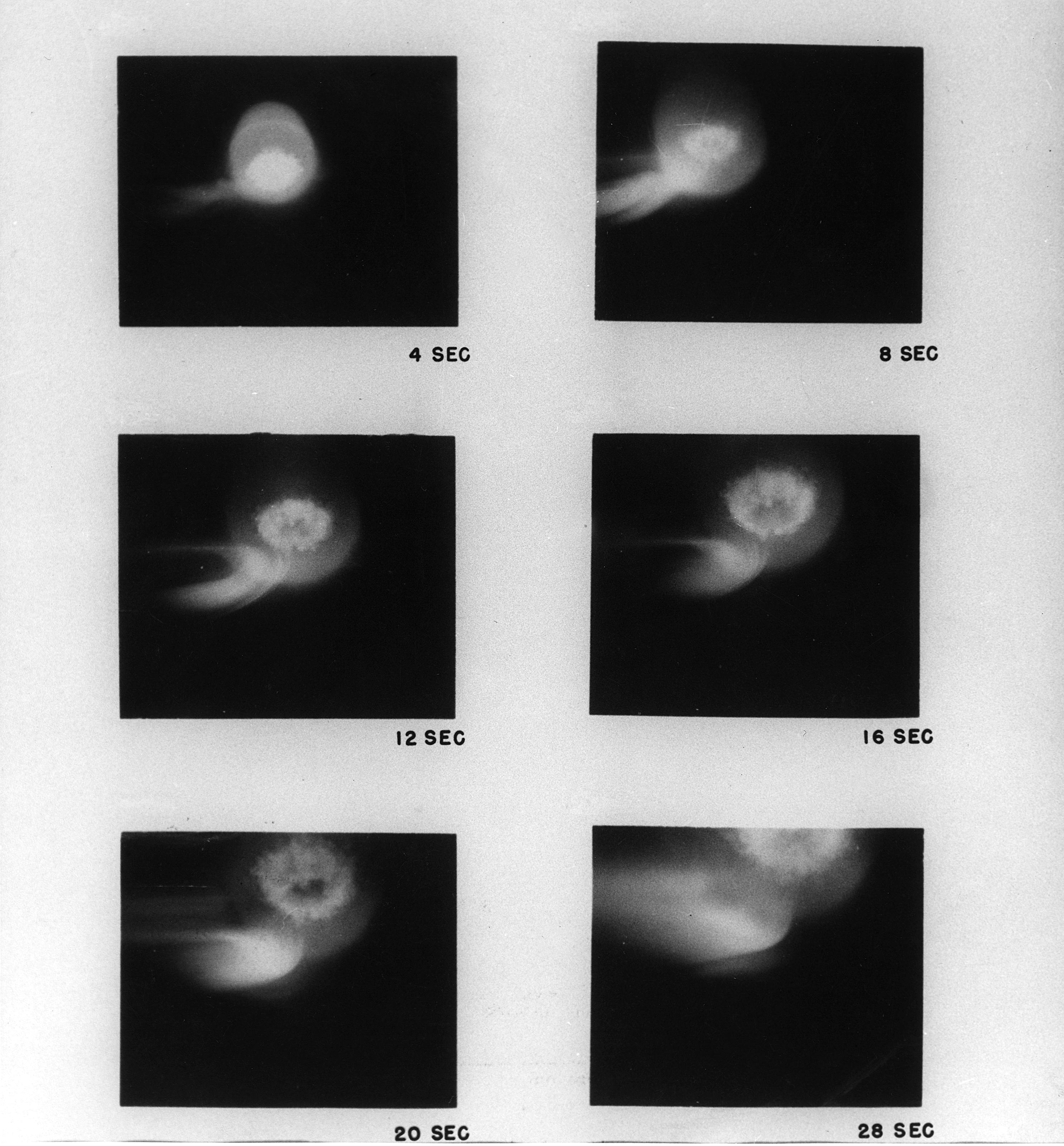
Late phases of TEAK fireball and formation of Northern Branch of Aurora as viewed from aircraft flying northwest of explosion.

In general, nuclear effects in space (or very high altitudes) have a qualitatively different display. While an atmospheric nuclear explosion has a characteristic mushroom-shaped cloud, high-altitude and space explosions tend to manifest a spherical 'cloud' until distorted by Earth's magnetic field. The charged particles resulting from the blast are accelerated along the Earth's magnetic field lines to create an auroral display at the conjugate point, which has led documentary maker Peter Kuran to characterize these detonations as 'the rainbow bombs'. The visual effects of a high-altitude or space-based explosion may last longer than atmospheric tests, sometimes in excess of 30 minutes. Heat from the Bluegill Triple Prime shot, at an altitude of 50 kilometers (31 miles), was felt by personnel on the ground at Johnston Atoll, and this test caused retina burns to two personnel at ground zero who were not wearing their safety goggles.

== Soviet high-altitude tests ==
The Soviets detonated four high-altitude tests in 1961 and three in 1962. During the Cuban Missile Crisis in October 1962, both the US and the USSR detonated several high-altitude nuclear explosions as a form of saber rattling.

The worst effects of a Soviet high-altitude test occurred on 22 October 1962, in the Soviet Project K nuclear tests (ABM System A proof tests) when a 300 kt missile-warhead detonated near Dzhezkazgan at 290-kilometre (180 mi) altitude. The EMP fused 570 kilometres (350 mi) of overhead telephone line with a measured current of 2,500 A, started a fire that burned down the Karaganda power plant, and shut down 1,000 kilometres (620 mi) of shallow-buried power cables between Tselinograd and Alma-Ata.

== List of high-altitude nuclear explosions ==
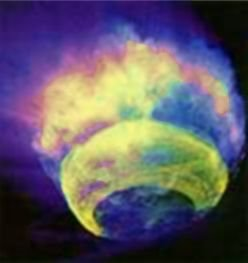
Hardtack I Orange

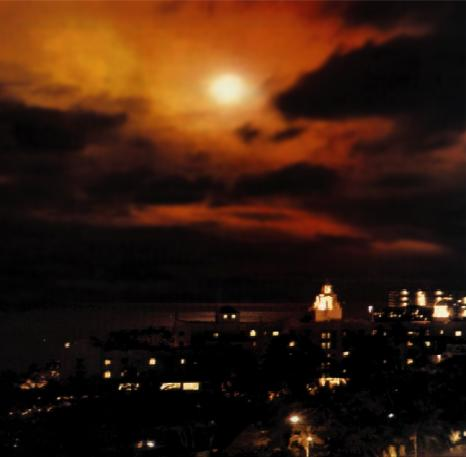
View of Starfish Prime through thin cloud, as seen from Honolulu, 1,300 km away.

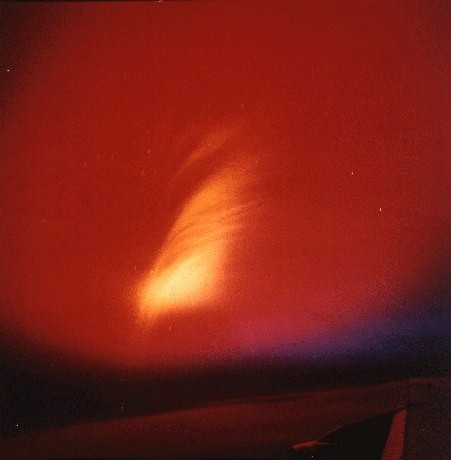
The debris fireball and aurora created by the Starfish Prime test, as seen from a KC-135 aircraft at 3 minutes.

Mission	Date	Yield	Altitude
US Hardtack I – (Operation Newsreel) – Johnston Atoll, Pacific Ocean
Yucca	28 April 1958	1.7 kt	26.2 km
Teak	1 August 1958	3.8 Mt	76.8 km
Orange	12 August 1958	3.8 Mt	34 km
US Argus – South Atlantic Ocean
Argus I	27 August 1958	1.7 kt	200 km
Argus II	30 August 1958	1.7 kt	240 km
Argus III	6 September 1958	1.7 kt	540 km
USSR – 1961 tests – Kapustin Yar
Test #88	6 September 1961	10.5 kt	22.7 km
Test #115	6 October 1961	40 kt	41.3 km
Test #127	27 October 1961	1.2 kt	150 km
Test #128	27 October 1961	1.2 kt	300 km
US – Dominic I – (Operation Fishbowl) – Johnston Atoll, Pacific Ocean
Bluegill	3 June 1962	failed	
Bluegill Prime	25 July 1962	failed	
Bluegill Double Prime	15 October 1962	failed	
Bluegill Triple Prime	26 October 1962	410 kt	50 km
Starfish	20 June 1962	failed	
Starfish Prime	9 July 1962	1.4 Mt	400 km
Checkmate	20 October 1962	7 kt	147 km
Kingfish	1 November 1962	410 kt	97 km
Tightrope	4 November 1962	<5 kt	30–80 km
USSR – Project K – Kapustin Yar
Test #184	22 October 1962	300 kt	290 km
Test #187	28 October 1962	300 kt	150 km
Test #195	1 November 1962	300 kt	59 km

== See also ==
- Nuclear weapons testing
- Nuclear electromagnetic pulse
- Operation Argus
- Operation Fishbowl
- Outer Space Treaty
- Partial Test Ban Treaty
- Project Highwater
- Soviet Project K nuclear tests
