= Nuclear electromagnetic pulse =

Effect of a nuclear explosion on electronic equipment

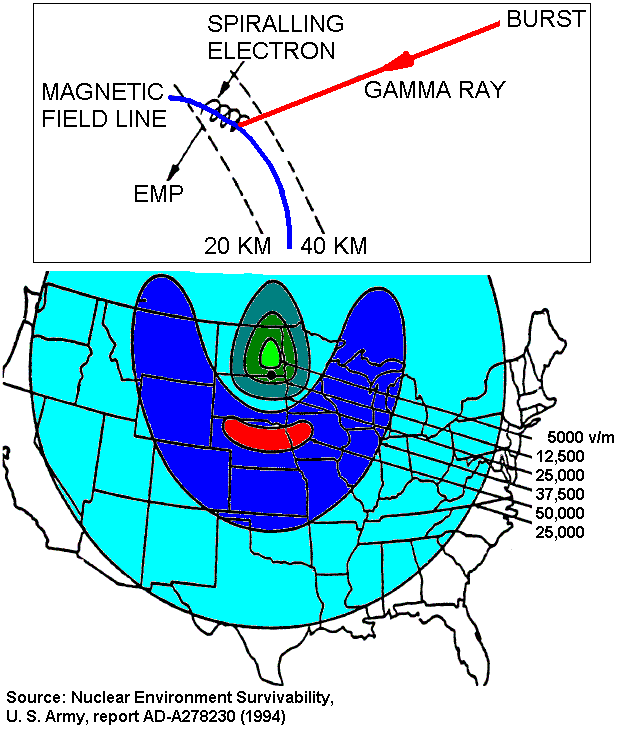
A 400-kilometre-high (250 mi; 1,300,000 ft) EMP: gamma rays hit the atmosphere between 20–40 km (66,000–131,000 ft) altitude, ejecting electrons, which are then deflected sideways by Earth's magnetic field, over a large area. Because of the curvature and downward tilt of Earth's magnetic field over the US, the maximum EMP occurs south of the detonation and the minimum occurs to the north.

A nuclear electromagnetic pulse (nuclear EMP or NEMP) is a burst of electromagnetic radiation created by a nuclear explosion. The resulting rapidly varying electric and magnetic fields may couple with electrical and electronic systems to produce damaging current and voltage surges. The specific characteristics of a particular nuclear EMP event vary according to a number of factors, the most important of which is the altitude of the detonation.

The term "electromagnetic pulse" generally excludes optical (infrared, visible, ultraviolet) and ionizing (such as X-ray and gamma radiation) ranges. In military terminology, a nuclear warhead detonated tens to hundreds of miles above the Earth's surface is known as a high-altitude electromagnetic pulse (HEMP) device. Effects of a HEMP device depend on factors including the altitude of the detonation, energy yield, gamma ray output, interactions with the Earth's magnetic field and electromagnetic shielding of targets. The long range of HEMP effects was discovered by accident during the 1962 Starfish Prime nuclear test over the Pacific, which knocked out electronics in Hawaii, 1,445 kilometres (898 mi) away.

The use of a HEMP in warfare is a topic of international geopolitical concern, though less likely than commonly thought. Because a HEMP requires a nuclear weapon, any use of a HEMP would likely escalate to total nuclear war. However, a HEMP might be used as a first strike weapon to degrade an adversary's response in a full nuclear war. Because an effective HEMP requires advanced technology, real-time satellite data, a high-yield nuclear weapon, and sub-orbital missiles, only a few nations are capable of HEMP warfare. The United States, China, and Russia are HEMP capable; a few other nuclear powers may be HEMP capable. China and Russia are reputed to have "super-EMP" capacity.

Electrical and telecommunication utilities are most vulnerable to HEMPs, as long wires act as antennae. Hardening key infrastructure against EMPs is similar to hardening infrastructure against geomagnetic storms. Individual vehicles (including aircraft) or electrical components may be protected against EMPs. HEMP risk to civilians is indirect; the risk mainly stems from cascading effects on infrastructure and especially food production, though HEMP risks pale in comparison to the direct blast effects of an atmospheric nuclear weapon.

== History ==
The fact that an electromagnetic pulse is produced by a nuclear explosion was known in the earliest days of nuclear weapons testing. The magnitude of the EMP and the significance of its effects were not immediately realized.

During the first United States nuclear test on 16 July 1945, electronic equipment was shielded because Enrico Fermi expected the electromagnetic pulse. The official technical history for that first nuclear test states, "All signal lines were completely shielded, in many cases doubly shielded. In spite of this many records were lost because of spurious pickup at the time of the explosion that paralyzed the recording equipment." During British nuclear testing in 1952–53, instrumentation failures were attributed to "radioflash", which was their term for EMP.

The first openly reported observation of the unique aspects of high-altitude nuclear EMP occurred during the helium balloon-lofted Yucca nuclear test of the Hardtack I series on 28 April 1958. In that test, the electric field measurements from the 1.7 kiloton weapon exceeded the range to which the test instruments were adjusted and was estimated to be about five times the limits to which the oscilloscopes were set. The Yucca EMP was initially positive-going, whereas low-altitude bursts were negative-going pulses. Also, the polarization of the Yucca EMP signal was horizontal, whereas low-altitude nuclear EMP was vertically polarized. In spite of these many differences, the unique EMP results were dismissed as a possible wave propagation anomaly.

The high-altitude nuclear tests of 1962, as discussed below, confirmed the unique results of the Yucca high-altitude test and increased the awareness of high-altitude nuclear EMP beyond the original group of defense scientists. The larger scientific community became aware of the significance of the EMP problem after a three-article series on nuclear EMP was published in 1981 by William J. Broad in Science.

=== Starfish Prime ===
In July 1962, the US carried out the Starfish Prime test, exploding a 1.44 Mt (6.0 PJ) bomb 400 kilometres (250 mi; 1,300,000 ft) above the mid-Pacific Ocean. This demonstrated that the effects of a high-altitude nuclear explosion were much larger than had been previously calculated. Starfish Prime made those effects known to the public by causing electrical damage in Hawaii, about 1,445 kilometres (898 mi) away from the detonation point, disabling approximately 300 streetlights, triggering numerous burglar alarms and damaging a microwave link.

The EMP damage of the Starfish Prime test was quickly repaired due, in part, to the fact that the EMP over Hawaii was relatively weak compared to what could be produced with a more intense pulse, and in part due to the relative ruggedness (compared to today) of Hawaii's electrical and electronic infrastructure in 1962.

The relatively small magnitude of the Starfish Prime EMP in Hawaii (about 5.6 kilovolts/metre) and the relatively small amount of damage (for example, only 1% to 3% of streetlights extinguished) led some scientists to believe, in the early days of EMP research, that the problem might not be significant. Later calculations showed that if the Starfish Prime warhead had been detonated over the northern continental United States, the magnitude of the EMP would have been much larger (22 to 30 kV/m) because of the greater strength of the Earth's magnetic field over the United States, as well as its different orientation at high latitudes. These calculations, combined with the accelerating reliance on EMP-sensitive microelectronics, heightened awareness that EMP could be a significant problem.

Starfish Prime was the first success in the series of United States high-altitude nuclear tests in 1962 known as Operation Fishbowl. Subsequent tests gathered more data on the high-altitude EMP phenomenon. The Bluegill Triple Prime and Kingfish high-altitude nuclear tests of October and November 1962 in Operation Fishbowl provided data that was clear enough to enable physicists to accurately identify the physical mechanisms behind the electromagnetic pulses.

=== Soviet Test 184 ===
In 1962, the Soviet Union performed three EMP-producing nuclear tests in space over Kazakhstan, the last in the "Soviet Project K nuclear tests". Although these weapons were much smaller (300 kiloton) than the Starfish Prime test, they were over a populated, large landmass and at a location where the Earth's magnetic field was greater. The damage caused by the resulting EMP was reportedly much greater than in Starfish Prime. The geomagnetic storm–like E3 pulse from Test 184 induced a current surge in a long underground power line that caused a fire in the power plant in the city of Karaganda.

After the dissolution of the Soviet Union, the level of this damage was communicated informally to US scientists. For a few years US and Russian scientists collaborated on the HEMP phenomenon. Funding was secured to enable Russian scientists to report on some of the Soviet EMP results in international scientific journals. As a result, formal documentation of some of the EMP damage in Kazakhstan exists, although it is still sparse in the open-scientific literature.

For one of the K Project tests, Soviet scientists instrumented a 570-kilometer (350 mi) section of telephone line in the area that they expected to be affected by the pulse. The monitored telephone line was divided into sub-lines of 40 to 80 kilometres (25 to 50 mi) in length, separated by repeaters. Each sub-line was protected by fuses and by gas-filled overvoltage protectors. The EMP from the 22 October (K-3) nuclear test (also known as Test 184) blew all of the fuses and destroyed all of the overvoltage protectors in all of the sub-lines. Published reports, including a 1998 IEEE article, have stated that there were significant problems with ceramic insulators on overhead electrical power lines during the tests. A 2010 technical report written for Oak Ridge National Laboratory stated that "Power line insulators were damaged, resulting in a short circuit on the line and some lines detaching from the poles and falling to the ground".

== Characteristics ==
Nuclear EMP is a complex multi-pulse, usually described in terms of three components, as defined by the International Electrotechnical Commission (IEC). The three components of nuclear EMP, as defined by the IEC, are called "E1", "E2", and "E3". The three categories of high-altitude EMP are divided according to the time duration and occurrence of each pulse. E1 is the fastest or "early time" high-altitude EMP. Traditionally, the term "EMP" often refers specifically to this E1 component of high-altitude electromagnetic pulse.

The E2 and E3 pulses are often further subdivided into additional divisions according to causation. E2 is a much lower intensity "intermediate time" EMP, which is further divided into E2A (scattered gamma EMP) and E2B (neutron gamma EMP). E3 is a very long-duration "late time" pulse, which is extremely slow in rise and fall times compared to the other components of EMP. E3 is further divided into E3A (blast wave) and E3B (heave). E3 is also called magnetohydrodynamic EMP.

=== E1 ===
The E1 pulse is a very fast component of nuclear EMP. E1 is a brief but intense electromagnetic field that induces high voltages in electrical conductors. E1 causes most of its damage by causing electrical breakdown voltages to be exceeded. E1 can destroy computers and communications equipment and it changes too quickly (nanoseconds) for ordinary surge protectors to provide effective protection from it. Fast-acting surge protectors (such as those using TVS diodes) will block the E1 pulse.

E1 is produced when gamma radiation from the nuclear detonation ionizes (strips electrons from) atoms in the upper atmosphere. This is known as the Compton effect and the resulting current is called the "Compton current". The electrons travel in a generally downward direction at relativistic speeds (more than 90 percent of the speed of light). In the absence of a magnetic field, this would produce a large, radial pulse of electric current propagating outward from the burst location confined to the source region (the region over which the gamma photons are attenuated). The Earth's magnetic field exerts a force on the electron flow at a right angle to both the field and the particles' original vector, which deflects the electrons and leads to synchrotron radiation. Because the outward traveling gamma pulse is propagating at the speed of light, the synchrotron radiation of the Compton electrons adds coherently, leading to a radiated electromagnetic signal. This interaction produces a large, brief, pulse.

Several physicists worked on the problem of identifying the mechanism of the HEMP E1 pulse. The mechanism was finally identified by Conrad Longmire of Los Alamos National Laboratory in 1963. Longmire gives numerical values for a typical case of E1 pulse produced by a second-generation nuclear weapon such as those of Operation Fishbowl. The typical gamma rays given off by the weapon have an energy of about 2 MeV (mega electron-volts). The gamma rays transfer about half of their energy to the ejected free electrons, giving an energy of about 1 MeV.

In a vacuum and absent a magnetic field, the electrons would travel with a current density of tens of amperes per square metre. Because of the downward tilt of the Earth's magnetic field at high latitudes, the area of peak field strength is a U-shaped region to the equatorial side of the detonation. As shown in the diagram, for nuclear detonations in the Northern Hemisphere, this U-shaped region is south of the detonation point. Near the equator, where the Earth's magnetic field is more nearly horizontal, the E1 field strength is more nearly symmetrical around the burst location.

At geomagnetic field strengths typical of the mid-latitudes, these initial electrons spiral around the magnetic field lines with a typical radius of about 85 metres (280 ft). These initial electrons are stopped by collisions with air molecules at an average distance of about 170 metres (560 ft). This means that most of the electrons are stopped by collisions with air molecules before completing a full spiral around the field lines.

This interaction of the negatively charged electrons with the magnetic field radiates a pulse of electromagnetic energy. The pulse typically rises to its peak value in some five nanoseconds. Its magnitude typically decays by half within 200 nanoseconds. (By the IEC definition, this E1 pulse ends 1000 nanoseconds after it begins.) This process occurs simultaneously on about 10^{25} electrons. The simultaneous action of the electrons causes the resulting pulse from each electron to radiate coherently, adding to produce a single large-amplitude, short-duration, radiated pulse.

Secondary collisions cause subsequent electrons to lose energy before they reach ground level. The electrons generated by these subsequent collisions have so little energy that they do not contribute significantly to the E1 pulse.

These 2 MeV gamma rays typically produce an E1 pulse near ground level at moderately high latitudes that peaks at about 50,000 volts per metre. The ionization process in the mid-stratosphere causes this region to become an electrical conductor, a process that blocks the production of further electromagnetic signals and causes the field strength to saturate at about 50,000 volts per metre. The strength of the E1 pulse depends upon the number and intensity of the gamma rays and upon the rapidity of the gamma-ray burst. Strength is also somewhat dependent upon altitude.

There are reports of "super-EMP" nuclear weapons (discussed further below) that are able to exceed the 50,000 volts per metre limit by unspecified mechanisms. The reality and possible construction details of these weapons are classified and are, therefore, unconfirmed in the open scientific literature.

=== E2 ===
The E2 component is generated by scattered gamma rays and inelastic gammas produced by neutrons. This E2 component is an "intermediate time" pulse that, by IEC definition, lasts from about one microsecond to one second after the explosion. E2 has many similarities to lightning, although lightning-induced E2 may be considerably larger than a nuclear E2. Because of the similarities and the widespread use of lightning protection technology, E2 is generally considered to be the easiest to protect against.

According to the United States EMP Commission, the main problem with E2 is that it immediately follows E1, which may have damaged the devices that would normally protect against E2. The EMP Commission Executive Report of 2004 states, "In general, it would not be an issue for critical infrastructure systems since they have existing protective measures for defense against occasional lightning strikes. The most significant risk is synergistic because the E2 component follows a small fraction of a second after the first component's insult, which has the ability to impair or destroy many protective and control features. The energy associated with the second component thus may be allowed to pass into and damage systems."

=== E3 ===
The E3 component is different from E1 and E2. E3 is a much slower pulse, lasting tens to hundreds of seconds. It is caused by the nuclear detonation's temporary distortion of the Earth's magnetic field. The E3 component has similarities to a geomagnetic storm. Like a geomagnetic storm, E3 can produce geomagnetically induced currents in long electrical conductors, damaging components such as power line transformers.

Because it is the most long-lasting phase, the E3 component has the potential to be the most damaging, even though its power levels are lower than E1 or E2. E3 damage at a point is dependent on the electrical impedance of the underlying rock strata, and thus, geology plays a role in determining EMP damage.

Because of the similarity between solar-induced geomagnetic storms and nuclear E3, it has become common to refer to solar-induced geomagnetic storms as "Solar EMP". "Solar EMP" does not include E1 or E2 components.

== Generation ==
Factors that control weapon effectiveness include altitude, yield, construction details, target distance, intervening geographical features, and local strength of the Earth's magnetic field. Some effectiveness variables remain classified.

=== Weapon altitude ===
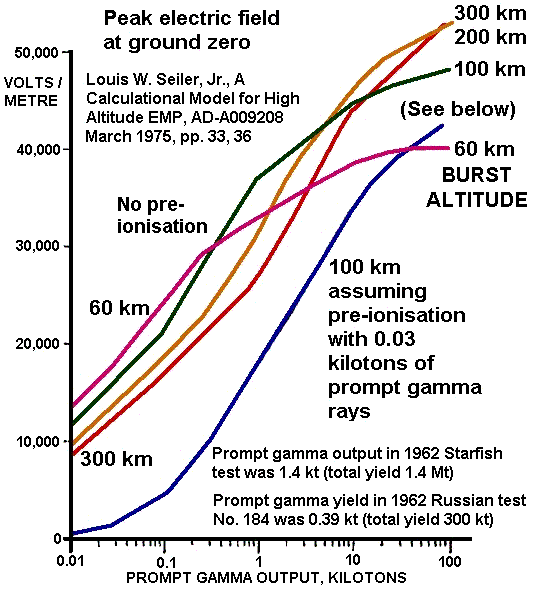
How the peak EMP on the ground varies with the weapon yield and burst altitude. The yield here is the prompt gamma ray output measured in kilotons. This varies from 0.115 to 0.5% of the total weapon yield, depending on weapon design. The 1.4 Mt total yield 1962 Starfish Prime test had a gamma output of 0.1%, hence 1.4 kt of prompt gamma rays (the blue 'pre-ionisation' curve applies to certain types of thermonuclear weapons, for which gamma and X-rays from the primary fission stage ionize the atmosphere and make it electrically conductive before the main pulse from the thermonuclear stage. The pre-ionisation in some situations can literally short out part of the final EMP, by allowing a conduction current to immediately oppose the Compton current of electrons).

While all nuclear weapons produce an EMP, blast effects predominate over EMP effects in atmospheric detonations. Only once a detonation occurs at sufficient altitude (greater than 5 km (3.1 mi)) does the EMP effect become notable outside the blast area.

According to an internet primer published by the Federation of American Scientists:

A high-altitude nuclear detonation produces an immediate flux of gamma rays from the nuclear reactions within the device. These photons in turn produce high energy free electrons by Compton scattering at altitudes between (roughly) 20 and 40 km. These electrons are then trapped in the Earth's magnetic field, giving rise to an oscillating electric current. This current is asymmetric in general and gives rise to a rapidly rising radiated electromagnetic field called an electromagnetic pulse (EMP). Because the electrons are trapped essentially simultaneously, a very large electromagnetic source radiates coherently.

The pulse can easily span continent-sized areas, and this radiation can affect systems on land, sea, and air. ... A large device detonated at 400–500 km (250–310 mi) over Kansas would affect all of the continental U.S. The signal from such an event extends to the visual horizon as seen from the burst point.

Thus, for equipment to be affected, the weapon needs to be above the visual horizon.

The altitude indicated above is greater than that of the International Space Station and many low Earth orbit satellites. Large weapons could have a dramatic impact on satellite operations and communications such as occurred during Operation Fishbowl. The damaging effects on orbiting satellites are usually due to factors other than EMP. In the Starfish Prime nuclear test, most damage was to the satellites' solar panels while passing through radiation belts created by the explosion.

For detonations within the atmosphere, the situation is more complex. Within the range of gamma ray deposition, simple laws no longer hold as the air is ionized and there are other EMP effects, such as a radial electric field due to the separation of Compton electrons from air molecules, together with other complex phenomena. For a surface burst, absorption of gamma rays by air would limit the range of gamma-ray deposition to approximately 16 kilometres (10 mi), while for a burst in the lower-density air at high altitudes, the range of deposition would be far greater.

=== Weapon yield ===
Typical nuclear weapon yields used during Cold War planning for EMP attacks were in the range of 1 to 10 Mt (4.2 to 41.8 PJ). This is roughly 50 to 500 times the size of the Hiroshima and Nagasaki bombs. Physicists have testified at United States Congressional hearings that weapons with yields of 10 kt (42 TJ) or less can produce a large EMP.

The EMP at a fixed distance from an explosion increases at most as the square root of the yield (see the illustration to the right). This means that although a 10 kt (42 TJ) weapon has only 0.7% of the energy release of the 1.44 Mt (6.0 PJ) Starfish Prime test, the EMP will be at least 8% as powerful. Since the E1 component of nuclear EMP depends on the prompt gamma-ray output, which was only 0.1% of yield in Starfish Prime but can be 0.5% of yield in low-yield pure nuclear fission weapons, a 10 kt (42 TJ) bomb can easily be 5 * 8%=40% as powerful as the 1.44 Mt (6.0 PJ) Starfish Prime at producing EMP.

The total prompt gamma-ray energy in a fission explosion is 3.5% of the yield, but in a 10 kt (42 TJ) detonation the triggering explosive around the bomb core absorbs about 85% of the prompt gamma rays, so the output is only about 0.5% of the yield. In the thermonuclear Starfish Prime the fission yield was less than 100% and the thicker outer casing absorbed about 95% of the prompt gamma rays from the pusher around the fusion stage. Thermonuclear weapons are also less efficient at producing EMP because the first stage can pre-ionize the air which becomes conductive and hence rapidly shorts out the Compton currents generated by the fusion stage. Hence, small pure fission weapons with thin cases are far more efficient at causing EMP than most megaton bombs.

This analysis, however, only applies to the fast E1 and E2 components of nuclear EMP. The geomagnetic storm-like E3 component of nuclear EMP is more closely proportional to the total energy yield of the weapon.

=== Target distance ===
In nuclear EMP all of the components of the electromagnetic pulse are generated outside of the weapon.

For high-altitude nuclear explosions, much of the EMP is generated far from the detonation (where the gamma radiation from the explosion hits the upper atmosphere). This electric field from the EMP is remarkably uniform over the large area affected.

According to the standard reference text on nuclear weapons effects published by the U.S. Department of Defense, "The peak electric field (and its amplitude) at the Earth's surface from a high-altitude burst will depend upon the explosion yield, the height of the burst, the location of the observer, and the orientation with respect to the geomagnetic field. As a general rule, however, the field strength may be expected to be tens of kilovolts per metre over most of the area receiving the EMP radiation."

The text also states that, "... over most of the area affected by the EMP the electric field strength on the ground would exceed 0.5E_{max}. For yields of less than a few hundred kilotons, this would not necessarily be true because the field strength at the Earth's tangent could be substantially less than 0.5E_{max}." E_{max} refers to the maximum electric field strength in the affected area.

In other words, the electric field strength in the entire area that is affected by the EMP will be fairly uniform for weapons with a large gamma-ray output. For smaller weapons, the electric field may fall at a faster rate as distance increases.

== Super-EMP ==
Also known as an "Enhanced-EMP", a super-electromagnetic pulse is a relatively new type of warfare in which a nuclear weapon is designed to create a far greater electromagnetic pulse in comparison to standard nuclear weapons of mass destruction. These weapons capitalize on the E1 pulse component of a detonation involving gamma rays, creating an EMP yield of potentially up to 200,000 volts per meter. For decades, numerous countries have experimented with the creation of such weapons, most notably China and Russia.

=== China ===
According to a statement made in writing by the Chinese military, the country has super-EMPs and has discussed their use in attacking Taiwan. Such an attack could debilitate information systems in the nation. The Taiwanese military has subsequently confirmed Chinese possession of super-EMPs and their possible destruction to power grids.

In addition to Taiwan, Dr Peter Pry discusses the possible implications of a Chinese attack on the United States with these weapons. While the United States also possesses nuclear weapons, the country has not experimented with super-EMPs and is hypothetically highly vulnerable to any future attacks by nations. This is due to the country's reliance on computers to control much of the government and economy. Abroad, U.S. aircraft carriers stationed within a reasonable range of an exploding bomb could potentially be subject to complete destruction of missiles on board, as well as telecommunication systems that would allow them to communicate with nearby vessels and controllers on land.

=== Russia ===
Since the Cold War, Russia has experimented with the design and effects of EMP bombs.

The Soviet Union designed a system to deliver nuclear weapons from low Earth orbit, and proposals have been made by Russia to develop satellites supplied with EMP capabilities. This would call for detonations up to 100 kilometres (62 mi) above the Earth's surface, with the potential to disrupt the electronic systems of U.S. satellites suspended in orbit around the planet, many of which are vital for deterrence and alerting the country of possible incoming missiles.

== Effects ==
An energetic EMP can temporarily upset or permanently damage electronic equipment by generating high voltage and high current surges; semiconductor components are particularly at risk. The effects of damage can range from imperceptible to the eye, to devices blowing apart. Cables, even if short, can act as antennas to transmit pulse energy to the equipment.

=== Vacuum tube vis-à-vis solid-state electronics ===
Older, vacuum tube (valve)-based equipment is generally much less vulnerable to nuclear EMP than solid-state equipment, which is much more susceptible to damage by large, brief voltage and current surges. Soviet Cold War-era military aircraft often had avionics based on vacuum tubes because solid-state capabilities were limited and vacuum-tube gear was believed to be more likely to survive.

Other components in vacuum tube circuitry can be damaged by EMP. Vacuum tube equipment was damaged in the 1962 testing. The solid-state PRC-77 VHF manpackable two-way radio survived extensive EMP testing. The earlier PRC-25, nearly identical except for a vacuum tube final amplification stage, was tested in EMP simulators, but was not certified to remain fully functional.

=== Electronics in operation vis-à-vis inactive ===
Equipment that is running at the time of an EMP is more vulnerable. Even a low-energy pulse has access to the power source, and all parts of the system are illuminated by the pulse. For example, a high-current arcing path may be created across the power supply, burning out some device along that path. Such effects are hard to predict and require testing to assess potential vulnerabilities.

=== On aircraft ===
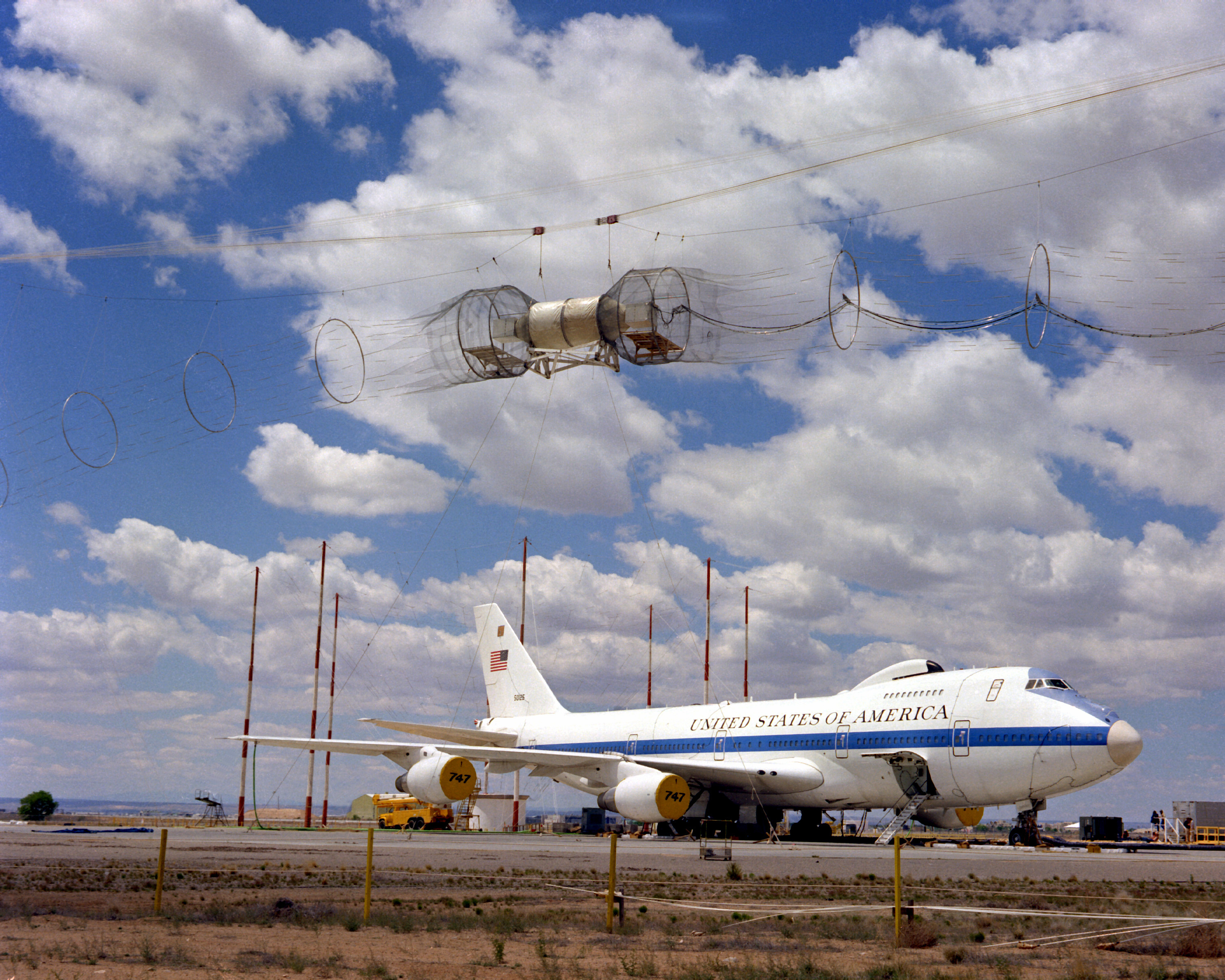
A Boeing E-4 advanced airborne command post (AABNCP) on the nuclear electromagnetic pulse (EMP) simulator for testing.

Many nuclear detonations have taken place using aerial bombs. The B-29 aircraft that delivered the nuclear weapons at Hiroshima and Nagasaki did not lose power from electrical damage, because electrons (ejected from the air by gamma rays) are stopped quickly in normal air for bursts below roughly 10 kilometres (33,000 ft), so they are not significantly deflected by the Earth's magnetic field.

If the aircraft carrying the Hiroshima and Nagasaki bombs had been within the intense nuclear radiation zone when the bombs exploded over those cities, then they would have suffered effects from the charge separation (radial) EMP. But this only occurs within the severe blast radius for detonations below about 33,000 feet (10 km) altitude.

During Operation Fishbowl, EMP disruptions were suffered aboard a KC-135 photographic aircraft flying 300 km (190 mi) from the 410 kt (1,700 TJ) detonations at 48 and 95 km (157,000 and 312,000 ft) burst altitudes. The vital electronics were less sophisticated than today's and the aircraft was able to land safely.

Modern aircraft are heavily reliant on solid-state electronics which are very susceptible to EMP blasts. Therefore, airline authorities are creating high intensity radiated fields (HIRF) requirements for new airplanes to help prevent the chance of crashes caused by EMPs or electromagnetic interference (EMI). To do this all parts of the airplane must be conductive. This is the main shield from EMP blasts as long as there are no holes for the waves to penetrate into the interior of the airplane. Also, insulating some of the main computers inside the plane adds an extra layer of protection from EMP blasts.

=== On cars ===
An EMP would probably not affect most cars, despite modern cars' heavy use of electronics, because cars' electronic circuits and cabling are likely too short to be affected. In addition, cars' metallic frames provide some protection. However, even a small percentage of cars breaking down due to an electronic malfunction would cause traffic jams.

=== On small electronics ===
An EMP has a smaller effect on shorter lengths of an electrical conductor. Other factors affect the vulnerability of electronics as well, so no hard cutoff length determines whether some piece of equipment will survive. However, small electronic devices, such as wristwatches and cell phones, would most likely withstand an EMP.

=== On humans and animals ===
Though electric potential difference can accumulate in electrical conductors after an EMP, it will generally not flow out into human or animal bodies, and thus contact is safe. Especially for a high altitude EMP, the pulse length is too short for current to flow through a living being.

The effect of a high altitude EMP detonation on humans remains unclear. Research has been done on localized EMPs, such as those created during the testing of military vehicles, and some research has been done on localized EMPs for therapeutic purposes. The United States Radiation Emergency Medical Management handbook states that "The EMP associated with a nuclear detonation poses no direct health threat, although health-related equipment may be affected."

A study in rat models found that exposure to 200–400 pulses of EMP caused the leaking of vessels in the brain, leakage that has been linked to small problems with thinking and memory recollection.

=== Indirect effects on agriculture ===
In addition to these direct effects, it has also been estimated that the disruption caused by the NEMP would have large negative effects on agriculture, due to the disruption of supply chains for agricultural inputs like fertilizers and pesticides. This could reduce yields in highly industrialized agricultural regions like Central Europe by up to 75%.

== Post-Cold War attack scenarios ==
While the effective use of a high altitude nuclear EMP could be devastating, several factors limit the likelihood of effectiveness, and practical considerations reduce the likelihood of a standalone EMP attack. Because the only effective way to deliver an EMP is through a high-yield sub-orbital nuclear weapon, using an EMP inherently means nuclear war. Only a handful of nations have the capacity to deliver an EMP. Additionally, the effective use of an EMP requires considerable real-time satellite data about atmospheric and geomagnetic conditions to accurately deliver a weapon to a location of maximum effectiveness. Thus, even fewer nations have the capacity to maximize EMP effectiveness. The odds of even an advanced nuclear nation triggering a successful EMP are estimated at about 50%.

In a nuclear war, an EMP may be a strategic first strike to degrade an adversary's response capacity. However, any use of an EMP would have a very high risk of escalating to full nuclear war. An EMP attack also has the downside of placing the attacker's own satellites or territory in danger of destruction, as the range of an EMP can be considerably variable. An EMP attack would also likely affect non-intended countries as collateral damage, which could further escalate a conflict.

At least the United States, China, and Russia are HEMP capable.

=== United States preparation ===
The United States EMP Commission was created by the United States Congress in 2001. The commission is formally known as the Commission to Assess the Threat to the United States from Electromagnetic Pulse (EMP) Attack.

The Commission brought together notable scientists and technologists to compile several reports. In 2008, the Commission released the "Critical National Infrastructures Report". This report describes the likely consequences of a nuclear EMP on civilian infrastructure. Although this report covered the United States, most of the information is applicable to other industrialized countries. The 2008 report was a follow-up to a more generalized report issued by the commission in 2004.

In written testimony delivered to the United States Senate in 2005, an EMP Commission staff member reported:

The EMP Commission sponsored a worldwide survey of foreign scientific and military literature to evaluate the knowledge, and possibly the intentions, of foreign states with respect to electromagnetic pulse (EMP) attacks. The survey found that the physics of the EMP phenomenon and the military potential of an EMP attack is widely understood in the international community, as reflected in official and unofficial writings and statements. The survey of open sources over the past decade finds that knowledge about EMP and EMP attacks is evidenced in at least Britain, France, Germany, Israel, Egypt, Taiwan, Sweden, Cuba, India, Pakistan, Iraq under Saddam Hussein, Iran, North Korea, China, and Russia.

Many foreign analysts—particularly in Iran, North Korea, China, and Russia —view the United States as a potential aggressor that would be willing to use its entire panoply of weapons, including nuclear weapons, in a first strike. They perceive the United States as having contingency plans to make a nuclear EMP attack, and as being willing to execute those plans under a broad range of circumstances.

Russian and Chinese military scientists in open source writings describe the basic principles of nuclear weapons designed specifically to generate an enhanced-EMP effect, which they term "Super-EMP" weapons. "Super-EMP" weapons, according to these foreign open source writings, can destroy even the best protected U.S. military and civilian electronic systems.

The United States EMP Commission determined that long-known protections are almost completely absent in the civilian infrastructure of the United States and that large parts of US military services were less-protected against EMP than during the Cold War. In public statements, the Commission recommended making electronic equipment and electrical components resistant to EMP – and maintaining spare parts inventories that would enable prompt repairs. The United States EMP Commission did not look at other nations.

In 2011, the Defense Science Board published a report about the ongoing efforts to defend critical military and civilian systems against EMP and other nuclear weapons effects.

The United States military services developed, and in some cases published, hypothetical EMP attack scenarios.

In 2017, the US Department of Energy published the "DOE Electromagnetic Pulse Resilience Action Plan", Edwin Boston published a dissertation on the topic and the EMP Commission published "Assessing the threat from electromagnetic pulse (EMP)". The EMP commission was closed in summer 2017. They found that earlier reports had underestimated the effects of an EMP attack on the national infrastructure, highlighted issues with communications from the DoD due to the classified nature of the material, and recommended that the DHS, instead of going to the DOE for guidance and direction, should directly cooperate with the more knowledgeable parts of the DOE. Several reports are in process of being released to the general public.

=== Attack by Iran ===
In the United States, concern over Iranian use of an EMP may have been a factor in the 2026 Iran war. However, Iran lacks the capability to deliver a highly destructive EMP and is unlikely to develop one in the near future, as even if it were to assemble a nuclear weapon, it would be of a rudimentary, low-yield design—and Iran lacks the delivery technology or satellite infrastructure to accurately deliver one. Additionally, Iran lacks a sufficiently long range nuclear-capable missile to strike the United States, though its missiles can reach Europe.

== Protecting infrastructure ==
Infrastructure that is protected against geomagnetic storms is likely already protected against the effects of an EMP. Thus, projects for hardening electrical grids against geomagnetic storms has a dual efficacy. For telecommunications, the use of fiber-optic cable rather than metal core cables reduces EMP risk, as fiber-optic cables are immune to EMP effects.

The problem of protecting civilian infrastructure from electromagnetic pulse has been intensively studied throughout the European Union, and in particular by the United Kingdom.

As of 2017, several electric utilities in the United States had been involved in a three-year research program on the impact of HEMP to the United States power grid led by an industry non-profit organization, Electric Power Research Institute (EPRI). According to research from Edd Gent, a 2019 report by the Electric Power Research Institute, which is funded by utility companies, found that a large EMP attack would probably cause regional blackouts but not a nationwide grid failure and that recovery times would be similar to those of other large-scale outages.

In 2018, the US Department of Homeland Security released the Strategy for Protecting and Preparing the Homeland against Threats from Electromagnetic Pulse (EMP) and Geomagnetic Disturbance (GMD), which was the department's first articulation of a holistic, long-term, partnership-based approach to protecting critical infrastructure and preparing to respond and recover from potentially catastrophic electromagnetic incidents. Progress on that front is described in the EMP Program Status Report.

Nuclear reactors are a particularly concerning risk point for EMPs, as they require constant coolant flow to prevent meltdown. Additionally, they would be needed to provide baseline power to reboot the grid after an EMP. The United States Nuclear Regulatory Commission prescribes rules for reactor EMP resilience. Reactors inside of containment buildings are effectively protected from an EMP, as the rebar in the containment building acts as a Faraday cage (though support equipment remains vulnerable and needs separate protection). Newer reactor designs, such as that from NuScale, achieve high EMP safety by ensuring the reactor is safe even in the event of a total electrical failure, and by grounding all equipment and piping.

According to an article from Naureen Malik, with North Korea's increasingly successful missile and warhead tests in mind, the U.S. Congress moved to renew funding for the Commission to Assess the Threat to the U.S. from Electromagnetic Pulse Attack as part of the National Defense Authorization Act.

According to research from Yoshida Reiji, in a 2016 article for the Tokyo-based nonprofit organization Center for Information and Security Trade Control, Onizuka warned that a high-altitude EMP attack would damage or destroy Japan's power, communications and transport systems as well as disable banks, hospitals and nuclear power plants.

== In fiction and popular culture ==
By 1981, a number of articles on nuclear electromagnetic pulse in the popular press spread knowledge of the nuclear EMP phenomenon into the popular culture. EMP has been subsequently used in a wide variety of fiction and other aspects of popular culture.

The popular media often depict EMP effects incorrectly, causing misunderstandings among the public and even professionals, and official efforts have been made in the United States to set the record straight. The United States Space Command commissioned science educator Bill Nye to narrate and produce a video called "Hollywood vs. EMP", so that inaccurate Hollywood fiction would not confuse those who must deal with real EMP events. The video is not available to the general public.

== See also ==
- Directed-energy weapon (DEW)
- Electromagnetic compatibility (EMC)
- Electromagnetic environment
- Electromagnetic warfare
- Explosively pumped flux compression generator
- F region
- Gamma-ray burst
- Geomagnetic storm
- High-altitude nuclear explosion
- Marx generator
- Nuclear terrorism
- Operation Fishbowl
- Pulsed power
- Soviet Project K nuclear tests
- Starfish Prime
- Ultrashort pulse
