= Starfish Prime =

1962 high-altitude nuclear test by the U.S. over the Pacific Ocean

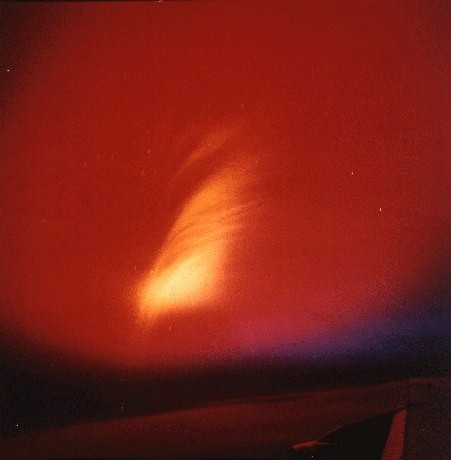
- The debris fireball stretching along Earth's magnetic field with air-glow aurora as seen at 3 minutes from a surveillance aircraft.

- Location within Pacific Ocean

Information
- Country: United States
- Test series: Operation Fishbowl
- Test site: Johnston Atoll
- Date: July 9, 1962; 64 years ago
- Test type: Exoatmospheric
- Yield: 1.4 Mt (5.9 PJ)

High Altitude Weapons Effects (1962) Official de-classified AEC information film reel.

Starfish Prime was a high-altitude nuclear test conducted by the United States, a joint effort of the United States Atomic Energy Commission (AEC) and the Defense Atomic Support Agency. It was launched from Johnston Atoll on July 9, 1962, and was the largest nuclear test conducted in outer space, and one of five conducted by the US in space.

A Thor rocket carrying a W49 thermonuclear warhead (designed at Los Alamos Scientific Laboratory) and a Mk. 2 reentry vehicle was launched from Johnston Atoll in the Pacific Ocean, about 900 miles (1,450 km) west-southwest of Hawaii. The explosion took place at an altitude of 250 miles (400 km), above a point 19 miles (31 km) southwest of Johnston Atoll. It had a yield of 1.4 Mt (5.9 PJ). The explosion was about 10° above the horizon as seen from Hawaii, at 11 pm Hawaii time.

== Operation Fishbowl ==
The Starfish test was one of five high-altitude tests grouped together as Operation Fishbowl within the larger Operation Dominic, a series of tests in 1962 begun in response to the Soviet Union’s announcement on August 30, 1961, that they would end a three-year moratorium on testing.

In 1958, the United States had completed six high-altitude nuclear tests that produced many unexpected results and raised many new questions. According to the U.S. Government Project Officer's Interim Report on the Starfish Prime project:

Previous high-altitude nuclear tests: YUCCA, TEAK, and ORANGE, plus the three ARGUS shots were poorly instrumented and hastily executed. Despite thorough studies of the meager data, present models of these bursts are sketchy and tentative. These models are too uncertain to permit extrapolation to other altitudes and yields with any confidence. Thus there is a strong need, not only for better instrumentation, but for further tests covering a range of altitudes and yields.

The Starfish test was originally planned as the second in the Fishbowl series, but the first launch (Bluegill) was lost by the radar tracking equipment and had to be destroyed in flight.

The initial Starfish launch attempt on June 20 was also aborted in flight, this time due to failure of the Thor launch vehicle. The Thor missile flew a normal trajectory for 59 seconds; then the rocket engine stopped, and the missile began to break apart. The range safety officer ordered the destruction of the missile and warhead. The missile was between 30,000 and 35,000 feet (9,100 and 10,700 m) in altitude when it was destroyed. Parts of the missile and some radioactive contamination fell upon Johnston Atoll, nearby Sand Island, and the surrounding ocean.

== Explosion ==
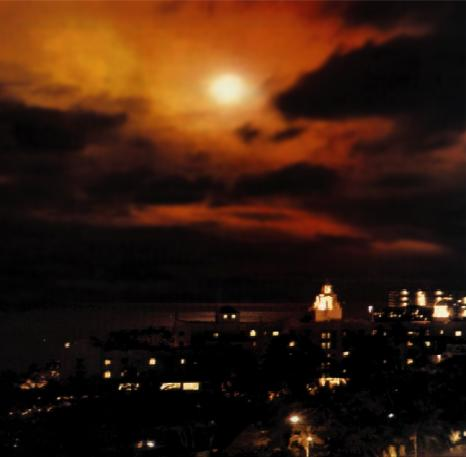
Another view of Starfish Prime through thin cloud, as seen from Honolulu.

On July 9, 1962, at 09:00:09 Coordinated Universal Time (11:00:09 pm on July 8, 1962, Honolulu time), the Starfish Prime test was detonated at an altitude of 250 miles (400 km). The coordinates of the detonation were 16°28′N 169°38′W. The actual weapon yield came very close to the design yield, which various sources have set at different values in the range of 1.4 to 1.45 Mt (5.9 to 6.1 PJ). The nuclear warhead detonated 13 minutes 41 seconds after liftoff of the Thor missile from Johnston Atoll.

Starfish Prime caused an electromagnetic pulse (EMP) that was far larger than expected, so much larger that it drove much of the instrumentation off scale, causing great difficulty in getting accurate measurements. The Starfish Prime electromagnetic pulse also made those effects known to the public by causing electrical damage in Hawaii, about 900 miles (1,450 km) away from the detonation point, knocking out about 300 streetlights, setting off numerous burglar alarms, and damaging a telephone company microwave link. The EMP damage to the microwave link shut down telephone calls from Kauai to the other Hawaiian Islands.

A total of 27 small rockets were launched from Johnston Atoll to obtain experimental data from the Starfish Prime detonation. In addition, a large number of rocket-borne instruments were launched from Barking Sands, Kauai, in the Hawaiian Islands.

A large number of United States military ships and aircraft were operating in support of Starfish Prime in the Johnston Atoll area and across the nearby North Pacific region.

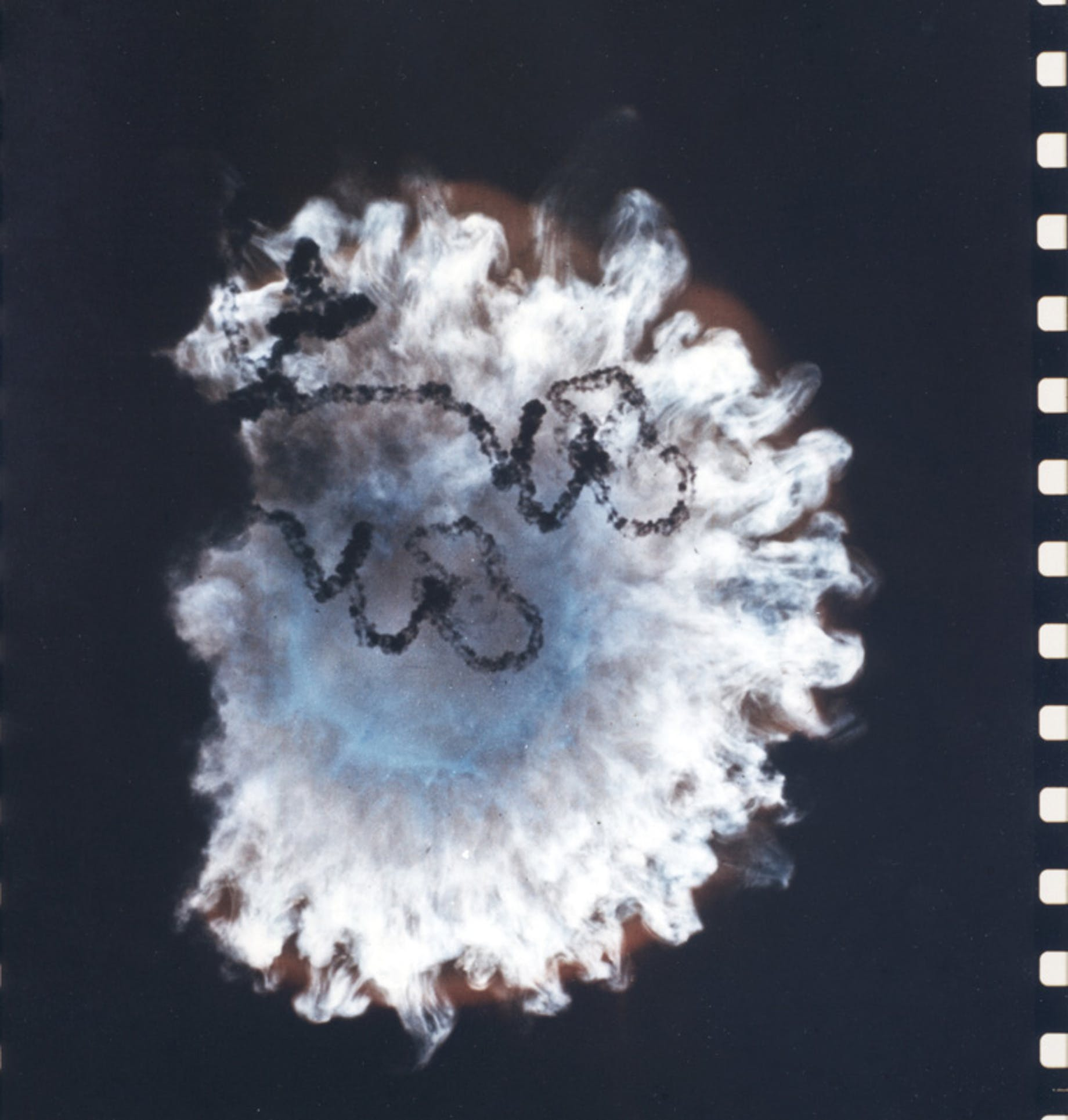
Frame of the Starfish Prime Nuclear Test

A few military ships and aircraft were also positioned in the region of the South Pacific Ocean near the Samoan Islands. This location was at the southern end of the magnetic field line of the Earth's magnetic field from the position of the nuclear detonation, an area known as the "southern conjugate region" for the test. An uninvited scientific expeditionary ship from the Soviet Union was stationed near Johnston Atoll for the test, and another Soviet scientific expeditionary ship was in the southern conjugate region near the Samoan Islands.

After the Starfish Prime detonation, bright auroras were observed in the detonation area, as well as in the southern conjugate region on the other side of the equator from the detonation. According to one of the first technical reports:

The visible phenomena due to the burst were widespread and quite intense; a very large area of the Pacific was illuminated by the auroral phenomena, from far south of the south magnetic conjugate area (Tongatapu) through the burst area to far north of the north conjugate area (French Frigate Shoals)... At twilight after the burst, resonant scattering of light from lithium and other debris was observed at Johnston and French Frigate Shoals for many days confirming the long time presence of debris in the atmosphere. An interesting side effect was that the Royal New Zealand Air Force was aided in anti-submarine maneuvers by the light from the bomb.

These auroral effects were partially anticipated by Nicholas Christofilos, a scientist who had earlier worked on the Operation Argus high-altitude nuclear shots.

According to U.S. atomic veteran Cecil R. Coale, some hotels in Hawaii offered "rainbow bomb" parties on their roofs for Starfish Prime, contradicting some reports that the artificial aurora was unexpected.

"A 'Quick Look' at the Technical Results of Starfish Prime" (August 1962) states:

At Kwajalein, 1,400 [nautical] miles [2,600 km; 1,600 mi] to the west, a dense overcast extended the length of the eastern horizon to a height of 5 or 8 degrees. At 0900 GMT a brilliant white flash burned through the clouds rapidly changing to an expanding green ball of irradiance extending into the clear sky above the overcast. From its surface extruded great white fingers, resembling cirro-stratus clouds, which rose to 40 degrees above the horizon in sweeping arcs turning downward toward the poles and disappearing in seconds to be replaced by spectacular concentric cirrus like rings moving out from the blast at tremendous initial velocity, finally stopping when the outermost ring was 50 degrees overhead. They did not disappear but persisted in a state of frozen stillness. All this occurred, I would judge, within 45 seconds. As the purplish light turned to magenta and began to fade at the point of burst, a bright red glow began to develop on the horizon at a direction 50 degrees north of east and simultaneously 50 degrees south of east expanding inward and upward until the whole eastern sky was a dull burning red semicircle 100 degrees north to south and halfway to the zenith obliterating some of the lesser stars. This condition, interspersed with tremendous white rainbows, persisted no less than ninety minutes.

At zero time at Johnston, a white flash occurred, but as soon as one could remove his goggles, no intense light was present. A second after shot time a mottled red disc was observed directly overhead and covered the sky down to about 45 degrees from the zenith. Generally, the red mottled region was more intense on the eastern portions. Along the magnetic north-south line through the burst, a white-yellow streak extended and grew to the north from near zenith. The width of the white streaked region grew from a few degrees at a few seconds to about 5–10 degrees in 30 seconds. Growth of the auroral region to the north was by addition of new lines developing from west to east. The white-yellow auroral streamers receded upward from the horizon to the north and grew to the south and at about 2 minutes the white-yellow bands were still about 10 degrees wide and extended mainly from near zenith to the south. By about two minutes, the red disc region had completed disappearance in the west and was rapidly fading on the eastern portion of the overhead disc. At 400 seconds essentially all major visible phenomena had disappeared except for possibly some faint red glow along the north-south line and on the horizon to the north. No sounds were heard at Johnston Atoll that could be definitely attributed to the detonation.

Strong electromagnetic signals were observed from the burst, as were significant magnetic field disturbances and earth currents.

A 2006 report described the particle and field measurements of the Starfish diamagnetic cavity and the injected beta flux into the artificial radiation belt. These measurements describe the explosion from 0.1 milliseconds to 16 minutes after the detonation.

=== Observations at Christchurch, New Zealand ===
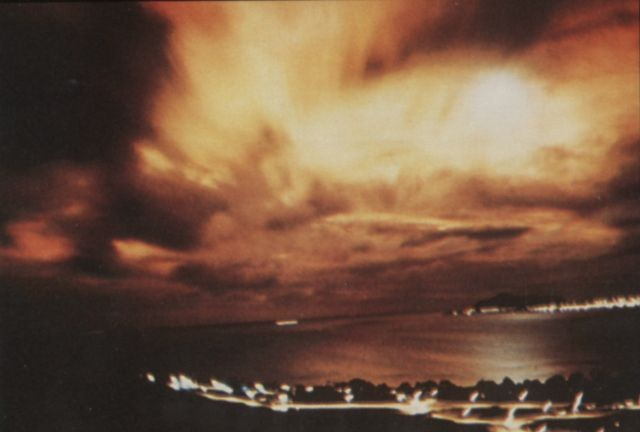
The flash created by the explosion as seen through heavy cloud cover from Honolulu, 900 miles (1,450 km) away

At the time of the Starfish Prime explosion, the physics department of the University of Canterbury in New Zealand was operating an airglow photometer at a field station near Rolleston, 20 miles (32 km) southeast of Christchurch. The photometer was designed and calibrated by Dr. I. Filosofo and others at the Illinois Institute of Technology. The airglow observation program was part of upper atmosphere research directed by Dr. C. Ellyett.

On July 9, 1962, Samuel Neff and his wife Ruth Neff were at the Rolleston field station to operate the photometer and record any observations. Photometric results were published in the Journal of Geophysical Research Letters. Christchurch is on approximately the same longitude as Johnston Island, but is much farther from the equator; consequently, the earth's magnetic lines of force entering the atmosphere near Christchurch were assumed to be too far above Johnston Island for there to be much linkage between Christchurch and the explosion. This assumption proved to be false.

Five to ten seconds after the explosion white auroral shafts were seen to emanate from the magnetic zenith. Within one minute these shafts had taken on a reddish tinge, and by 9:04 (GMT) the white structure was dominated by a red glow that covered most of the sky to the north and extended past the zenith to the south. The display of light was visible to the naked eye for about twelve minutes, though photometric values of intensity stayed above normal for more than an hour.

At the time of the explosion an ionosonde was recording at Godley Head, about 15 miles (24 km) from Christchurch. Geoff King and Harvey Cumack, of the Geophysical Observatory, (DSIR), Christchurch, combined the observed ionospheric and photometric results to gain insight into the mechanisms that could explain the visual observations. Though the ionosonde data was severely distorted, King and Cumack were able to obtain the electron density in the f region at four minutes after the explosion. Excitation of the 1D state of oxygen in the airglow and aurora is satisfactorily explained by a chemical process called dissociative recombination, for which most rate coefficients are known. King and Cumack were able to show that the intensity of 630 nm radiation measured by Neff was orders of magnitude greater than that which would be produced by recombination. The remaining possibility was that following the explosion, a wave of neutral plasma (ions plus electrons) entered the atmosphere over Christchurch with sufficient density and energy to produce the observed excitation through electron-atom collisions. These results were published in the New Zealand Journal of Geology and Geophysics, in December, 1962.

== Aftereffects ==
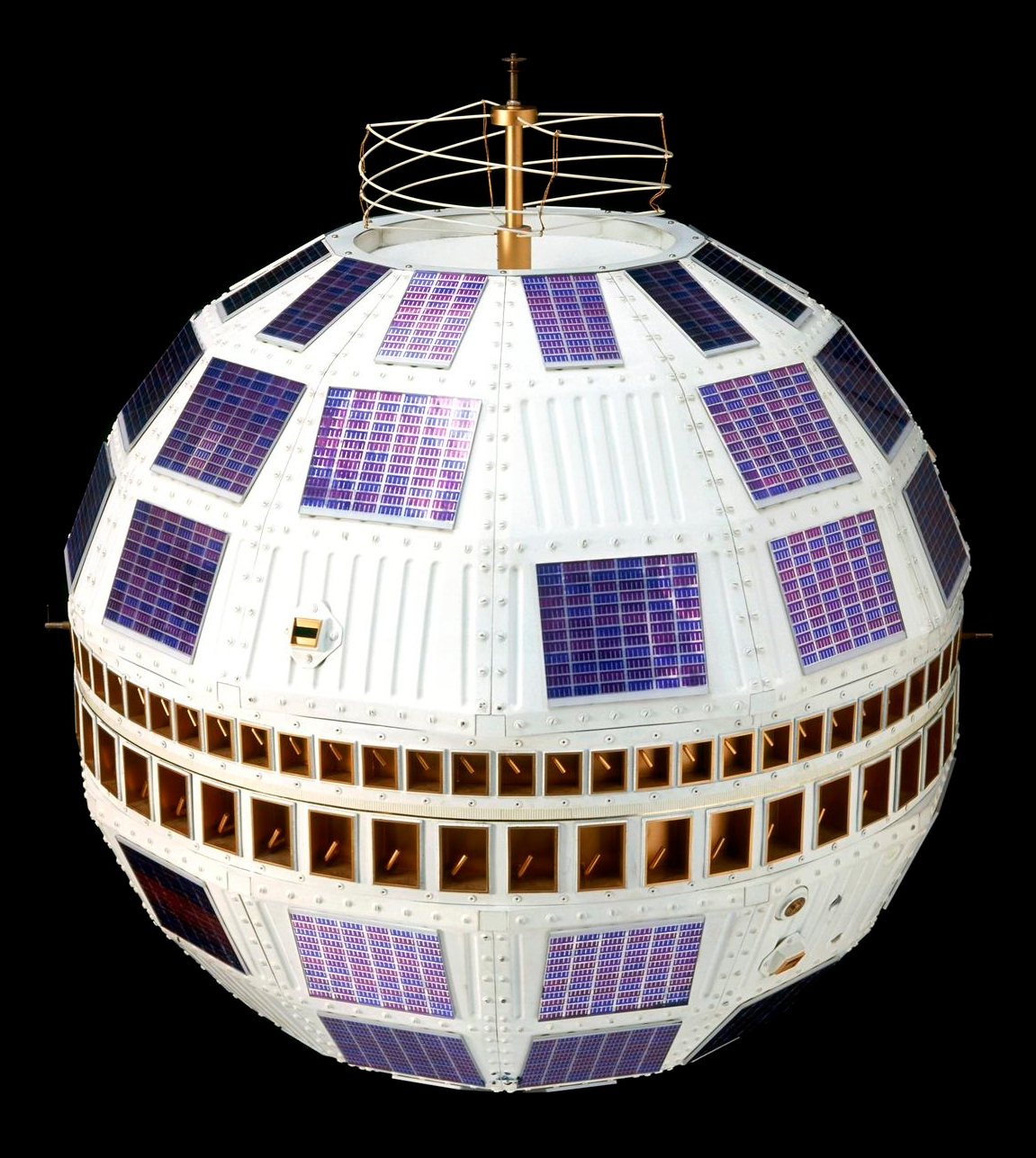
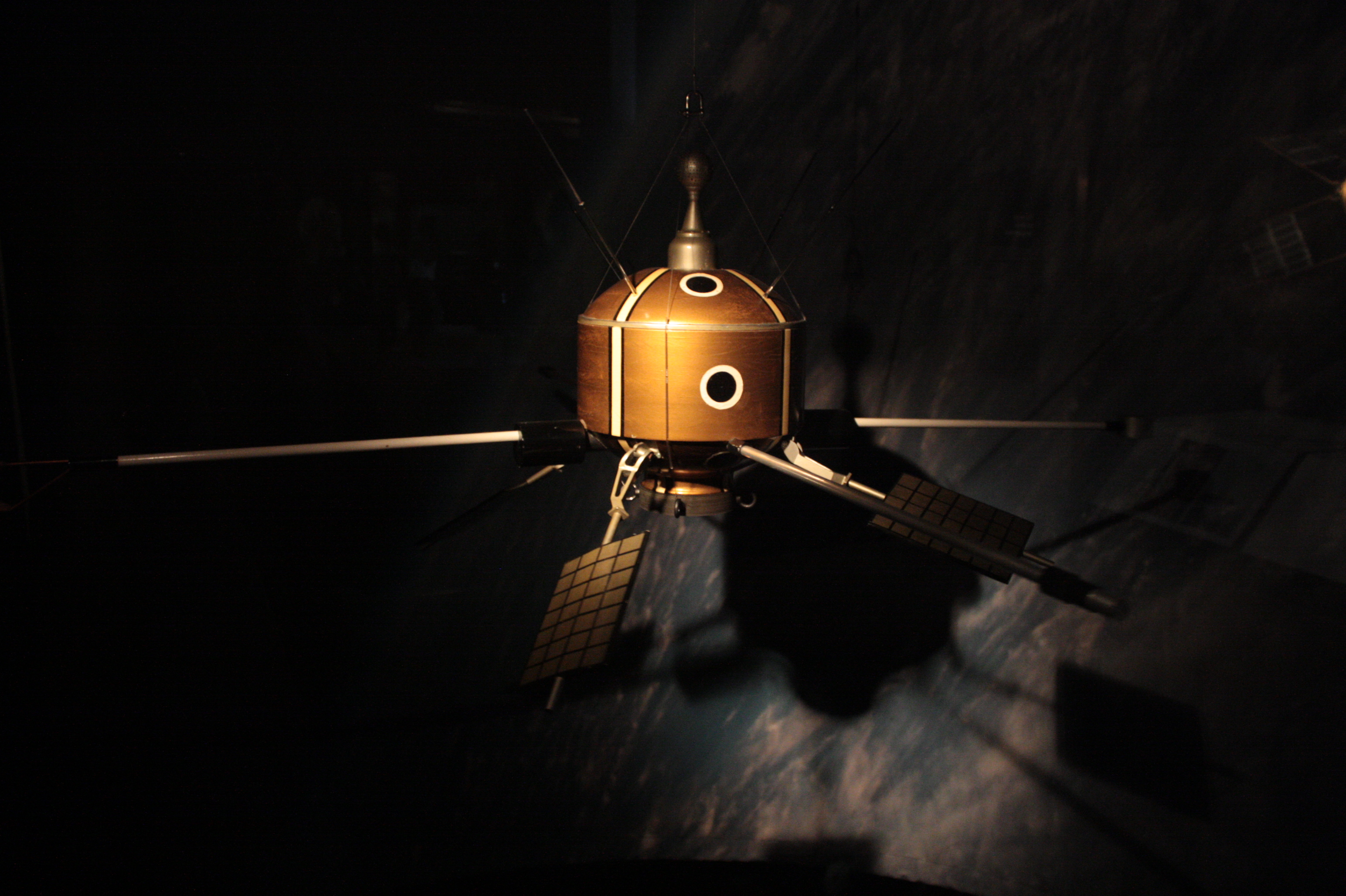
Telstar 1 (left), the first commercial satellite by AT&T Corporation and Ariel 1 (right), the first satellite of the United Kingdom, were both disabled by the radiation belts that the nuclear tests caused.

The explosion released roughly 10^{29} electrons into the Earth's magnetosphere. While some of the energetic beta particles followed the Earth's magnetic field and illuminated the sky, other high-energy electrons became trapped and formed radiation belts around the Earth. The added electrons increased the intensity of electrons within the natural inner Van Allen radiation belt by several orders of magnitude. There was much uncertainty and debate about the composition, magnitude and potential adverse effects from the trapped radiation after the detonation. The weaponeers became quite worried when three satellites in low Earth orbit were disabled. These included TRAAC and Transit 4B. The half-life of the energetic electrons was only a few days. At the time it was not known that solar and cosmic particle fluxes varied by a factor of 10, and energies could exceed 1 MeV (0.16 pJ). In the months that followed, these man-made radiation belts eventually caused six or more satellites to fail, as radiation damaged their solar arrays or electronics, including the first commercial relay communication satellite, Telstar 1, as well as the United Kingdom's first satellite, Ariel 1. Detectors on Telstar, TRAAC, Injun, and Ariel 1 were used to measure distribution of the radiation produced by the tests.

In 1963, it was reported that Starfish Prime had created a belt of MeV electrons. In 1968, it was reported that some Starfish electrons had remained in the atmosphere for five years.

A year after the test, in 1963, the US and USSR signed the Partial Nuclear Test Ban Treaty, which banned all above-ground nuclear testing. France and China continued above-ground tests for a few more decades.

== Resulting scientific discoveries ==
The Starfish bomb contained ^{109}Cd as a tracer, which helped work out the seasonal mixing rate of polar and tropical air masses.

The Christchurch, New Zealand teams listed above utilized atmospheric photometry to measure changes in airglow in the minutes following the detonation. This verified theoretical values of the decay constant of the ^{1}D state of oxygen atoms. They also determined that ^{3}P to ^{1}D transitions were occurring in the minutes after the detonation at a rate thousands of times that normally seen in the sky. This displayed the far-reaching atmospheric plasma created by the high-altitude nuclear explosion.

== See also ==
- List of artificial radiation belts
- List of nuclear weapons tests
