= Hardtack Teak =

High-altitude nuclear weapon test

- Hardtack-Teak, 3.88 megatons of TNT (16.2 PJ). Deployment via PGM-11 Redstone.

Information
- Country: United States
- Test series: Operation Newsreel during Operation Hardtack I
- Test site: Johnston Atoll
- Date: 1 August 1958; 68 years ago
- Test type: Exoatmospheric
- Yield: 3.88 megatons of TNT (16.2 PJ)

HARDTACK-Teak was an exoatmospheric high-altitude nuclear weapon test performed during Operation Newsreel. It was launched from Johnston Atoll on a Redstone missile. On 1 August 1958, the 3.88 Mt (16.2 PJ) shot detonated at an altitude of 76.8 km (252,000 ft; 47.7 mi).

Along with HARDTACK-Orange it was one of the two largest high-altitude nuclear explosions.

Wernher von Braun, who led the development of the Redstone missile, was a witness at the test aboard the USS Boxer.

== Planning ==
The 3.8-megaton detonation was planned to occur at an altitude of 76,000 m (250,000 ft) above a point approximately 9.7 km (6 mi) south of Johnston Island. However, due to a programming failure, it burst directly above the island at the desired altitude, making the island the effective ground zero. This brought the explosion 610 m (2,000 ft) nearer the launch site control and analysis crews than intended.

High Altitude Weapons Effects (1962) official de-classified AEC information film reel

The Teak test was originally planned to be launched from Bikini Atoll, but Lewis Strauss, chairman of the United States Atomic Energy Commission opposed the test because of fears that the flash from the nighttime detonation might blind Islanders who were living on nearby atolls. He finally agreed to approve the high-altitude test on the condition that the launch point be moved from Bikini Atoll to the more remote site at Johnston Island.

According to the United States Defense Nuclear Agency report (DNA6038F) on Operation Hardtack I:

Johnston Island was well situated for the high-altitude tests because of its isolation, the nearest inhabited island being 866 kilometres (538 mi) away. On the other hand, operations there had to consider aircraft and ship routes from Hawaii to Asia, as well as the close-in hazards of missile launch in a confined area and the firing of missiles over water areas used for ship anchorage.

That the hazard of primary concern is flashblindness and/or retinal burn expected to result from the programmed detonation. This hazard is calculated to extend to a range of 435 statute miles [700 km] at the surface...

== Effects ==
Location of test explosion that occurred above Johnston Island in Pacific Ocean

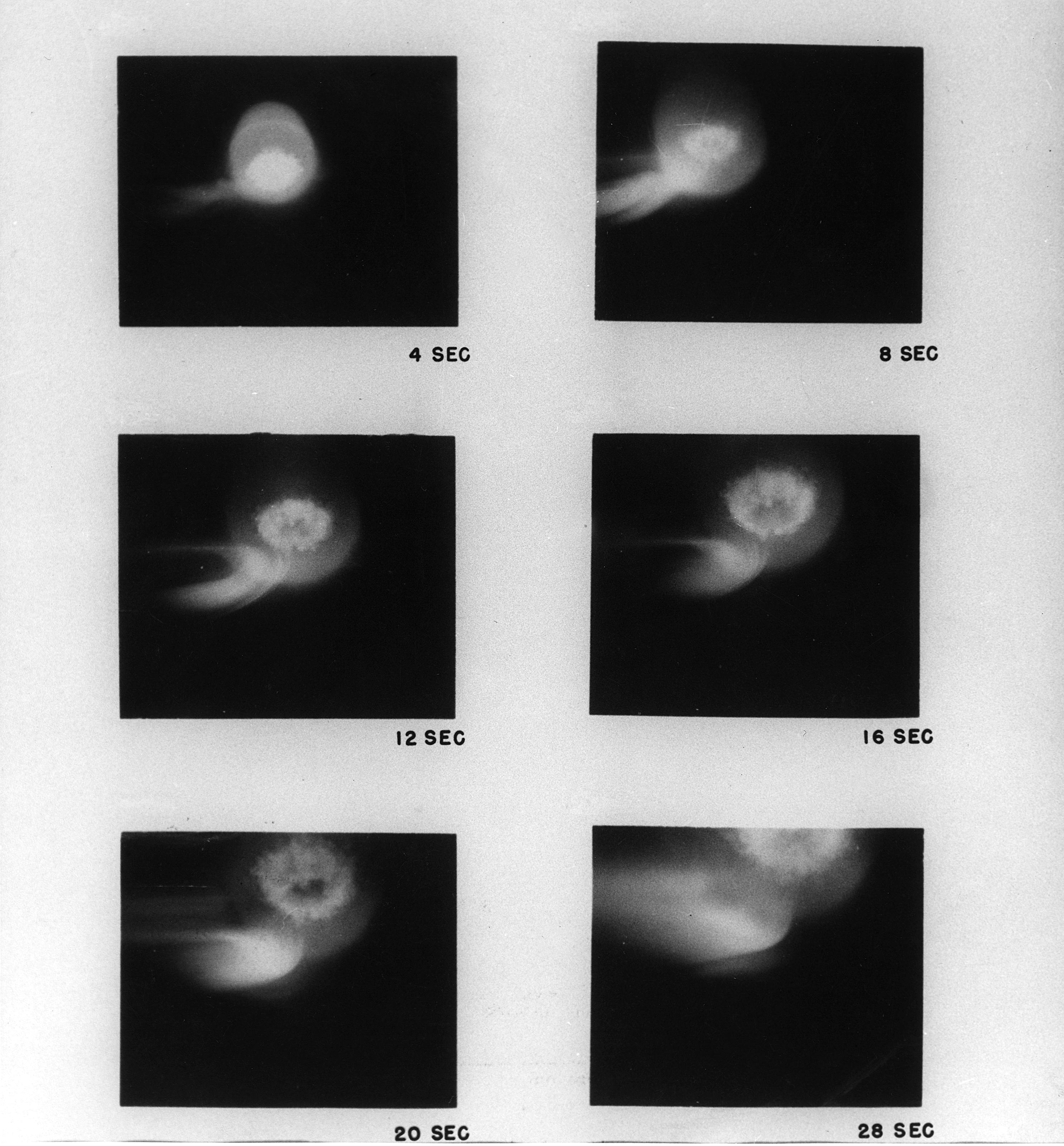
Late phases of TEAK fireball and formation of Northern Branch of Aurora as viewed from aircraft flying northwest of explosion

When the warhead burst at 76.8 km (252,000 ft) directly above Johnston Island, the flash effectively turned night into day, as shown in the "After" photo in the section above. The initial glow faded over a period of about 30 seconds. The thermal radiation output of the explosion was such that observers were forced to take cover in the "shade" for the first few moments, as can be seen in film footage of the test.

Teak caused communications impairment over a widespread area in the Pacific basin. This was due to the injection of a large quantity of fission debris into the ionosphere. The debris prevented normal ionospheric reflection of high-frequency (HF) radio waves back towards Earth, which disrupted most long-distance HF radio communications. The nuclear detonation occurred at 10:50 UTC on 1 August 1958 (which was 11:50 p.m., Johnston Island local time, on 31 July 1958).

A facility on Johnston Island prior, during and after to the burst at an altitude of 76.8 km (47.7 mi)

According to the book Defense's Nuclear Agency 1947–1997, when the Teak detonation occurred:

The Apia Observatory in Western Samoa approximately 2,000 miles to the south described the "... violent magnetic disturbance", which heralded "... the most brilliant manifestation of the Aurora Australis [Southern Lights] ever seen in Samoa". The resulting persistent ionization of the low-density atmosphere cut high frequency radio communications with New Zealand for six hours.

In Hawaii, where there had been no announcement of the test, the TEAK fireball turned from light yellow to dark yellow to orange to red. ... The red glow remained clearly visible in the southwestern sky for half an hour. In Honolulu, military and civilian air traffic communications were interrupted for several hours. At the AFSWP's Armed Forces Special Weapons Project offices in the Pentagon, Admiral Parker grew concerned for the personnel on Johnston Island as hour after hour passed with no word regarding the test. Finally, some eight hours after TEAK had occurred, the word that all was well came from Alvin Luedecke, the commander of Joint Task Force 7 and soon to be General Manager of the AEC. The communications blackout worried others as well. Later AFSWP learned that one of the first radio messages received at Johnston Island once communications were restored was: "Are you still there?"

According to page 269 of the Defense Nuclear Agency report on Operation Hardtack:

The detonation spread a layer of fission debris in the upper atmosphere and destroyed the ability of the normally ionized layers of the upper atmosphere to bend radio waves back to the Earth, thus cutting many trans-Pacific high-frequency communications circuits. This blackout lasted 9 hours in Australia and at least 2 hours in Hawaii. Honolulu telephone service was apparently not affected; the Honolulu police registered over 1,000 extra calls that night as startled residents asked for information on what they had seen.

According to civilian observer reports contained in the official United States Defense Nuclear Agency report on Operation Hardtack I:

A Honolulu resident described the burst in a page-1 story in the 1 August Honolulu Star-Bulletin:

I stepped out on the lanai and saw what must have been the reflection of the fireball. It turned from light yellow to dark yellow and from orange to red.

The red spread in a semi-circular manner until it seemed to engulf a large part of the horizon.

A cloud rose in the center of the circle. It was quite large and clearly visible. It remained visible for about a half-hour.

It looked much closer than Johnston Island. The elevation of the circle was perhaps 20° above the horizon.

Other descriptions in the same issue emphasized the red feature that appeared. From Mt. Haleakala on Maui, observers reported that this red shell appeared to pass overhead about 40 minutes after the detonation.

Gallery
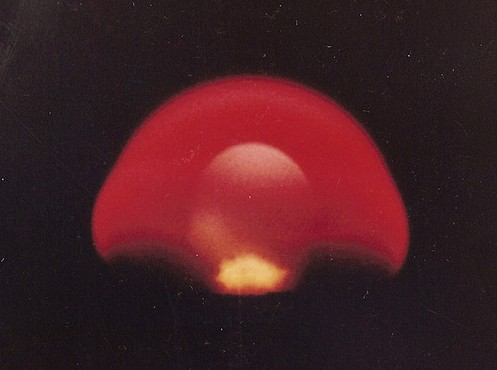
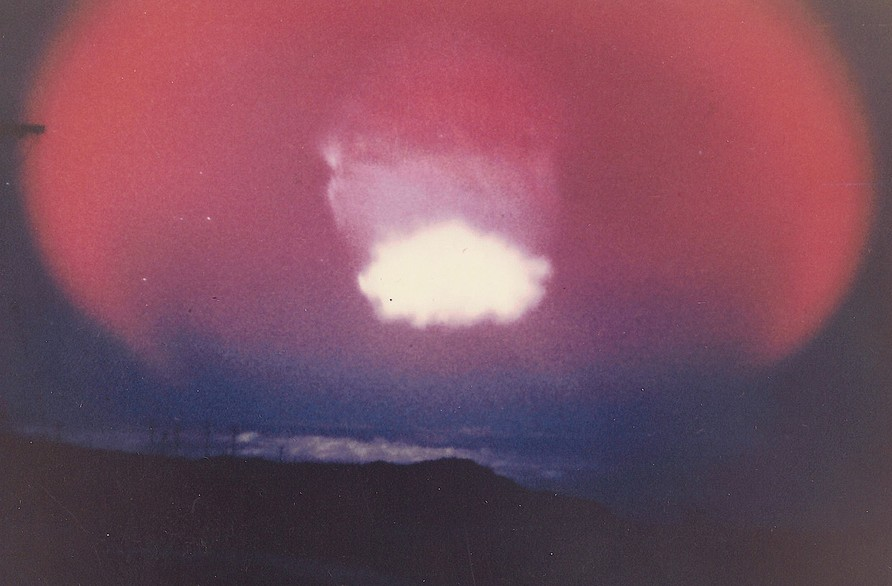
