= Soviet Project K nuclear tests =

1961–1962 series of Soviet weaponry tests

K project

Information
- Country: Soviet Union
- Test site: Karaganda, Kazakhstan
- Period: 1961–1962
- Number of tests: 5
- Test type: dry surface, space rocket (> 80 km)
- Max. yield: 300 kilotonnes of TNT (1,300 TJ)

Test series chronology

The Soviet Union's K project nuclear test series (Russian: Операция «К», romanized: Operatsiya "Ka") was a group of five nuclear tests conducted in 1961–1962. These tests followed the 1961 Soviet nuclear tests series and preceded the 1962 Soviet nuclear tests series.

The K project nuclear testing series were all high altitude tests fired by missiles from the Kapustin Yar launch site in Russia across central Kazakhstan toward the Sary Shagan test range (see map below).

Two of the tests were 1.2 kiloton warheads tested in 1961. The remaining three tests were of 300 kiloton warheads in 1962.

== Electromagnetic pulse ==
The worst effects of a Soviet high altitude test were from the electromagnetic pulse of the nuclear test on 22 October 1962 (during the Cuban Missile Crisis). In that Operation K high altitude test, a 300 kiloton missile-warhead detonated west of Jezkazgan (also called Dzhezkazgan or Zhezqazghan) at an altitude of 290 km (180 mi).

The Soviet scientists instrumented a 570-kilometer (350 mi) section of telephone line in the area that they expected to be affected by the nuclear detonation in order to measure the electromagnetic pulse effects. The electromagnetic pulse (EMP) fused all of the 570-kilometer monitored overhead telephone line with measured currents of 1500 to 3400 amperes during the 22 October 1962 test. The monitored telephone line was divided into sub-lines of 40 to 80 kilometres (25 to 50 mi) in length, separated by repeaters. Each sub-line was protected by fuses and by gas-filled overvoltage protectors. The EMP from the 22 October (K-3) nuclear test caused all of the fuses to blow and all of the overvoltage protectors to fire in all of the sub-lines of the 570 km (350 mi) telephone line. The EMP from the same test caused the destruction of the Karaganda power plant, and shut down 1,000 km (620 mi) of shallow-buried power cables between Astana (then called Aqmola) and Almaty (then called Alma-Ata).

The Partial Test Ban Treaty was passed the following year, ending atmospheric and exoatmospheric nuclear tests.

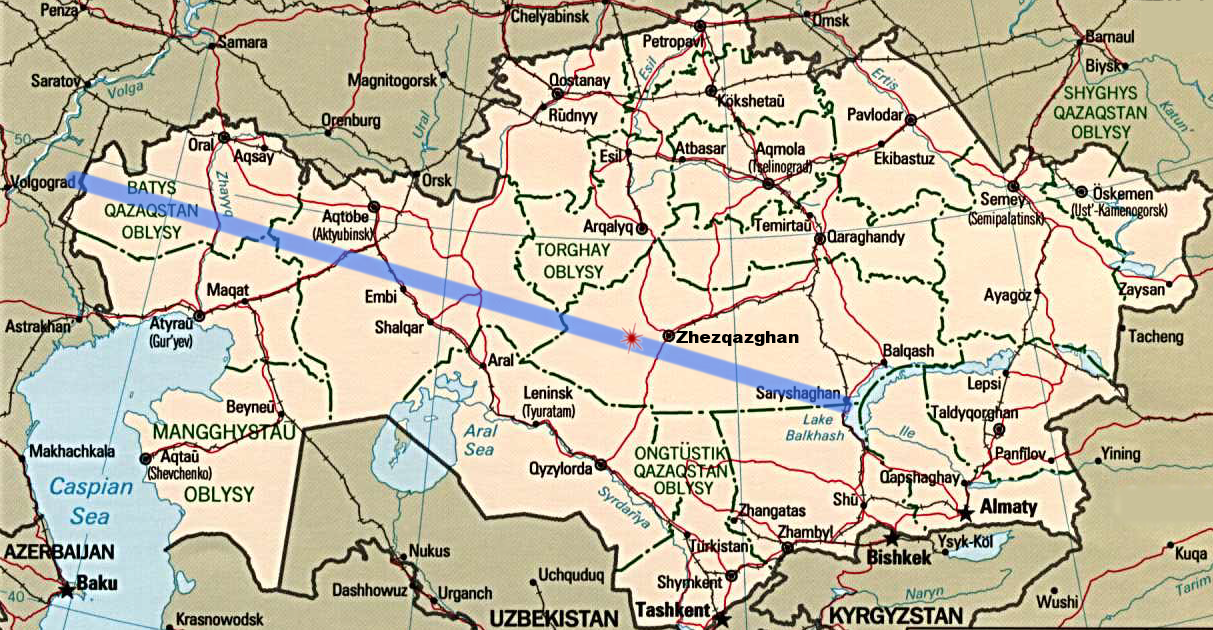
This map of Kazakhstan shows the missile flight path (in blue) for the K Project warhead-carrying missiles. The nuclear missiles were launched from the Kapustin Yar site east of Volgograd (formerly Stalingrad) in the upper left part of the map. The red burst in the flight path west of Zhezqazghan is the detonation location of the K-3 nuclear test (Test 184). The detonation locations for the other tests have not been publicized, but from the published detonation altitudes and basic physics, it is known that the other K Project nuclear detonation locations were along the designated flight path between the K-3 detonation site and Saryshagan (at the eastern end of the designated flight path). The instrumented telephone line damaged in the K-3 test went from Zhezqazghan through Qaraghandy (Karaganda), northward to Aqmola (now called Astana, the capital of Kazakhstan) and ended at an unknown location just north of Aqmola.

== Aftereffects ==
Although the weapons used in the K Project were much smaller (up to 300 kilotons) than the United States Starfish Prime test of 1962, the damage caused by the resulting EMP was much greater because the K Project tests were done over a large populated land mass, and at a location where the Earth's magnetic field was greater. After the collapse of the Soviet Union, the level of this damage was communicated informally to scientists in the United States.

After the 1991 Soviet Union collapse, there was a period of a few years of cooperation between United States and Russian scientists on the high-altitude nuclear EMP phenomenon. In addition, funding was secured to enable Russian scientists to formally report on some of the Soviet EMP results in international scientific journals. As a result, formal scientific documentation of some of the EMP damage in Kazakhstan exists but is still sparse in the open scientific literature.

The 1998 IEEE article, however, does contain a number of details about the measurements of EMP effects on the instrumented 570 km (350 mi) telephone line, including details about the fuses that were used and also about the gas-filled overvoltage protectors that were used on that communications line. According to that paper, the gas-filled overvoltage protectors fired as a result of the voltages induced by the fast E1 component of the EMP, and the fuses were blown as the result of the slow E3 component of the EMP, which caused geomagnetically induced currents in all of the sub-lines.

The Aqmola (now Astana) to Almaty buried power cable was also shut down by the slow E3 component of the EMP.

Published reports, including the 1998 IEEE article, have stated that there were significant problems with ceramic insulators on overhead electrical power lines during the tests of the K Project. In 2010, a technical report written for a United States government laboratory, Oak Ridge National Laboratory, stated, "Power line insulators were damaged, resulting in a short circuit on the line and some lines detaching from the poles and falling to the ground."

Soviet Union's K project series tests and detonations
Name (Note: The US, France and Great Britain have code-named their test events, while the USSR and China did not, and therefore have only test numbers (with some exceptions – Soviet peaceful explosions were named). Word translations into English in parentheses unless the name is a proper noun. A dash followed by a number indicates a member of a salvo event. The US also sometimes named the individual explosions in such a salvo test, which results in "name1 – 1(with name2)". If test is canceled or aborted, then the row data like date and location discloses the intended plans, where known.)	Date time (UT)	Local time zone (Note: To convert the UT time into standard local, add the number of hours in parentheses to the UT time; for local daylight saving time, add one additional hour. If the result is earlier than 00:00, add 24 hours and subtract 1 from the day; if it is 24:00 or later, subtract 24 hours and add 1 to the day. Historical time zone data obtained from the IANA time zone database.)	Location (Note: Rough place name and a latitude/longitude reference; for rocket-carried tests, the launch location is specified before the detonation location, if known. Some locations are extremely accurate; others (like airdrops and space blasts) may be quite inaccurate. "~" indicates a likely pro-forma rough location, shared with other tests in that same area.)	Elevation + height (Note: Elevation is the ground level at the point directly below the explosion relative to sea level; height is the additional distance added or subtracted by tower, balloon, shaft, tunnel, air drop or other contrivance. For rocket bursts the ground level is "N/A". In some cases it is not clear if the height is absolute or relative to ground, for example, Plumbbob/John. No number or units indicates the value is unknown, while "0" means zero. Sorting on this column is by elevation and height added together.)	Delivery, (Note: Atmospheric, airdrop, balloon, gun, cruise missile, rocket, surface, tower, and barge are all disallowed by the Partial Nuclear Test Ban Treaty. Sealed shaft and tunnel are underground, and remained useful under the PTBT. Intentional cratering tests are borderline; they occurred under the treaty, were sometimes protested, and generally overlooked if the test was declared to be a peaceful use.) Purpose (Note: Includes weapons development, weapon effects, safety test, transport safety test, war, science, joint verification and industrial/peaceful, which may be further broken down.)	Yield (Note: Estimated energy yield in tons, kilotons, and megatons. A ton of TNT equivalent is defined as 4.184 gigajoules (1 gigacalorie).)	References	Notes
127 K2 (Joe 109)	27 October 1961	ALMT (+6 h)	Launch from Kapustin Yar, Astrakhan: 1 48.56956°N 45.90346°E, elv: 0 + 0 m (0 + 0 ft); Detonation over Karagandy, Kazakhstan 46.408°N 72.237°E	N/A + 180 kilometres (110 mi)	space rocket (> 80 km), weapon effect	1.2 kt		First Soviet space test. Unknown where K2 detonated except it was along a line from K3 explosion to a point high above Sary Shagan, the missile target point. Effects on System A prototype ABM.
128 K1 (Joe 105)	27 October 1961	ALMT (+6 h)	Launch from Kapustin Yar, Astrakhan: 3 48.56956°N 45.90346°E, elv: 0 + 0 m (0 + 0 ft); Detonation over Karagandy, Kazakhstan 46.7°N 69.6°E	N/A + 300 kilometres (190 mi)	space rocket (> 80 km), weapon effect	1.2 kt		Unknown where K1 detonated except it was along a line from K3 explosion to a point high above Sary Shagan, the missile target point. Effects on System A prototype ABM. The CIA says Joe 105 was on 10/21, hence the number, but apparently is in error.
184 K3 (Joe 157)	22 October 1962 03:40:45	ALMT (+6 h)	Launch from Kapustin Yar, Astrakhan 48.56956°N 45.90346°E, elv: 0 + 0 m (0 + 0 ft); Detonation over Karagandy, Kazakhstan 47.76469°N 63.95136°E	N/A + 290 kilometres (180 mi)	space rocket (> 80 km), weapon effect	300 kt		Exploded short of target above Sary Shagan, west of Dzhezkazgan (or Zhezqazghan). EMP ran to thousands of amps, damaged at least 570 km of telephone lines, 1000 km of buried power lines, and caused the destruction of the Karaganda power plant.
187 K4 (Joe 160)	28 October 1962 04:41:20	ALMT (+6 h)	Launch from Kapustin Yar, Astrakhan 48.56956°N 45.90346°E, elv: 0 + 0 m (0 + 0 ft); Detonation over Karagandy, Kazakhstan 46.72983°N 71.56304°E	N/A + 150 kilometres (93 mi)	space rocket (> 80 km), weapons development	300 kt		Unknown where K4 detonated except it was along a line from K3 explosion to a point high above Sary Shagan, the missile target point.
195 K5 (Joe 168)	1 November 1962 09:12:??	ALMT (+6 h)	Launch from Kapustin Yar, Astrakhan 48.56956°N 45.90346°E, elv: 0 + 0 m (0 + 0 ft); Detonation over Karagandy, Kazakhstan 46.3298°N 72.77929°E	N/A + 59 kilometres (37 mi)	dry surface, weapons development	300 kt		Unknown where K5 detonated except it was along a line from K3 explosion to a point high above Sary Shagan, the missile target point.
