= Christofilos effect =

Entrapment of charged particles along geomagnetic lines of force

The Christofilos effect, sometimes known as the Argus effect, refers to the entrapment of electrons from nuclear weapons in the Earth's magnetic field. It was first predicted in 1957 by Nicholas Christofilos, who suggested the effect had defensive potential in a nuclear war, with so many beta particles becoming trapped that warheads flying through the region would experience huge electrical currents that would destroy their trigger electronics. The concept that a few friendly warheads could disrupt an enemy attack was so promising that a series of new nuclear tests was rushed into the US schedule before a testing moratorium came into effect in late 1958. These tests demonstrated that the effect was not nearly as strong as predicted, and not enough to damage a warhead. However, the effect is strong enough to be used to black out radar systems and disable satellites.

== Concept ==
=== Electrons from nuclear explosions ===
Among the types of energy released by a nuclear explosion are a large number of beta particles, or high energy electrons. These are primarily the result of beta decay within the debris from the fission portions of the bomb, which, in most designs, represents about 50% of the total yield.

Because electrons are electrically charged, they induce electrical currents in surrounding atoms as they pass them at high speed. This causes the atoms to ionize while also causing the beta particles to slow down. In the lower atmosphere, this reaction is so powerful that the beta particles slow to thermal speeds within a few tens of meters at most. This is well within a typical nuclear explosion fireball, so the effect is too small to be seen.

At high altitudes, the much less-dense atmosphere means the electrons are free to travel long distances. They have enough energy that they will not be recaptured by the proton that is created in the beta decay, so they can, in theory, last indefinitely.

=== Mirror effect ===
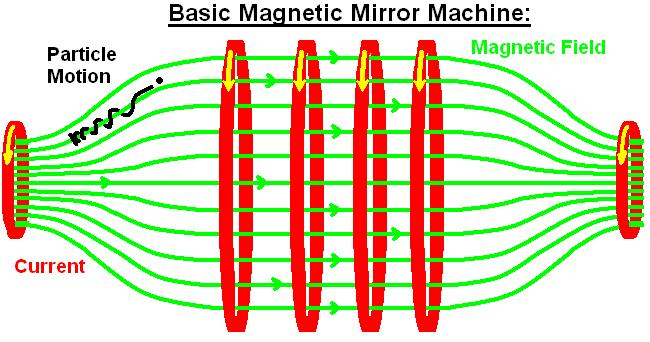
Charged particles (black) naturally orbit around the lines of a magnetic field (green lines). In the mirror, the strong field at the ends causes the particles to slow and then reverse their motion along the lines.

In 1951, as part of the first wave of research into fusion energy, University of California Radiation Laboratory at Livermore ("Livermore") researcher Richard F. Post introduced the magnetic mirror concept. The mirror is a deceptively simple device, consisting largely of a cylindrical vacuum chamber that holds the fusion fuel and an electromagnet wound around it to form a modified solenoid.

A solenoid normally generates a linear magnetic field along the center of its axis, in this case down the middle of the vacuum chamber. When charged particles are placed in a magnetic field, they orbit around the field lines, which, in this case, stops them from moving sideways and hitting the walls of the chamber. In a normal solenoid, they would still be free to move along the lines and thus escape out the ends. Post's insight was to wind the electromagnet in such a way that the field was stronger at the ends than in the center of the chamber. As particles flow towards the ends, these stronger fields force the lines together, and the resulting curved field causes particles to "reflect" back, thus leading to the name mirror.

In a perfect magnetic mirror, the particles of fuel would bounce back and forth, never reaching the ends nor touching the sides of the cylinder. However, even in theory, no mirror is perfect; there is always a population of particles with the right energy and trajectory that allow them to flow out of the ends through the "loss cone". This makes magnetic mirrors inherently leaky systems, although initial calculations suggested the rate of leakage was low enough that one could still use it to produce a fusion reactor.

=== Christofilos effect ===
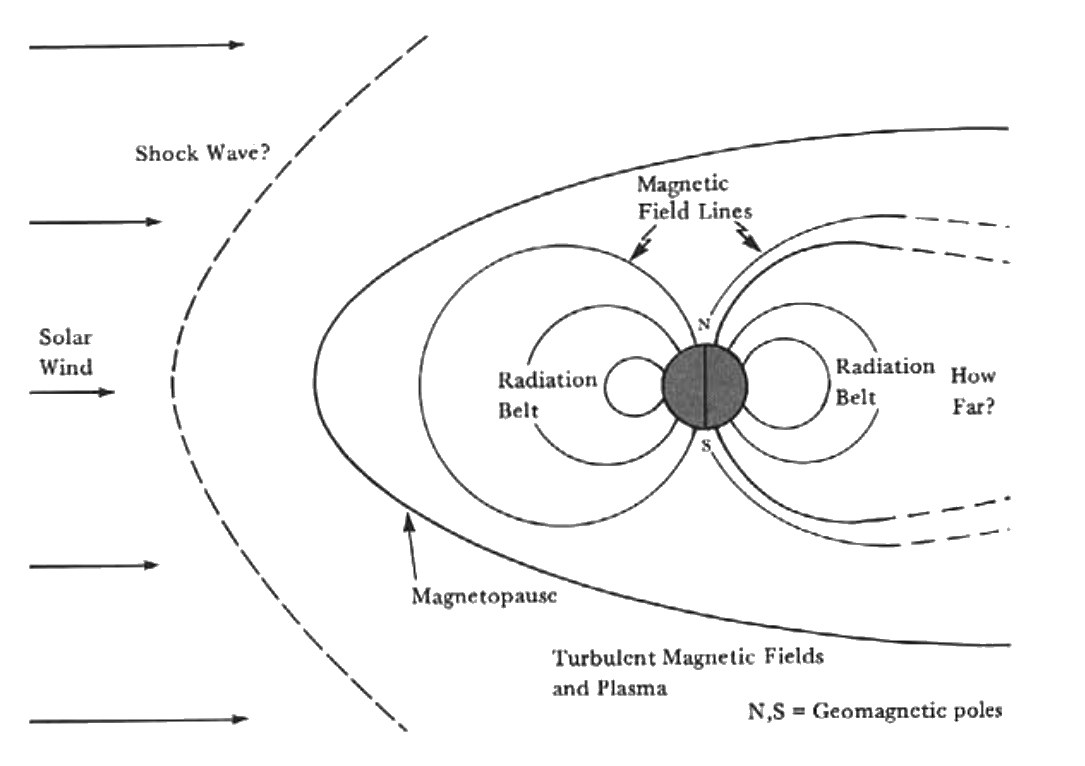
Near the poles, the Earth's field becomes denser, forming a natural magnetic mirror. This image, from 1962, reflects the lack of knowledge of the overall shape of the field at that time.

The shape of the Earth's magnetic field, or geomagnetic field, is similar to that of a magnetic mirror. The field balloons outward over the equator, and then necks down as it approaches the poles. Such a field would thus reflect charged particles in the same fashion as Post's mirrors. This was not a new revelation; it was already long understood to be the underlying basis for the formation of aurora. In the case of the aurora, particles of the solar wind begin orbiting around the field lines, bouncing back and forth between the poles. With every pass, some of the particles leak past the mirror points and interact with the atmosphere, ionizing the air and causing the light.

Electrons released by fission events are generally in the range of 1 to 2 MeV (0.16 to 0.32 pJ). Initially, these would be subject to mirroring high in the atmosphere, where they are unlikely to react with atmospheric atoms and might reflect back and forth for some time. When one considers a complete "orbit" from north pole to south and back again, the electrons naturally spend more time in the mirror regions because this is where they are slowing down and reversing. This leads to increased electron density at the mirror points. The magnetic field created by the moving electrons in this region interacts with the geomagnetic field in a way that causes the mirror points to be forced down into the atmosphere. Here, the electrons undergo more interactions as the density of the atmosphere increases rapidly. These interactions slow the electrons so they produce less magnetic field, resulting in an equilibrium point being reached in the upper atmosphere about 110 kilometers (70 mi) in altitude.

Using this as the average altitude as the basis for the air density calculation allowed the interaction rate with the atmosphere to be calculated. Running the numbers, it appeared that the average lifetime of an electron would be of the order of 2.8 days.

=== Example ===
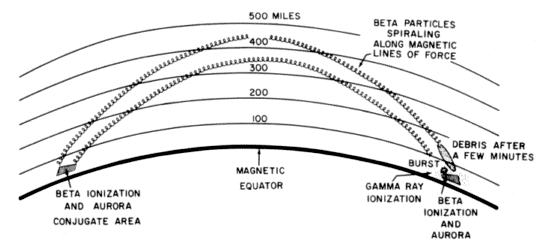
The Christofilos effect would produce an area of highly charged particles at a selected location. It was believed that by flying through this region at high speeds, the warheads or guidance systems of attacking missiles might be damaged.

As an illustration, Christofilos considered the explosion of a 1 Mt (4.2 PJ) bomb. This would produce 10^{26} fission events, which in turn produce four electrons per fission. For the mirror points being considered, almost any beta particle traveling roughly upward or downward would be captured, which he estimated to be about half of them, leaving 2×10^{26} electrons trapped in the field. Because of the shape of the Earth's field, and the results of the right-hand rule, the electrons would drift eastward and eventually create a shell around the entire Earth.

Assuming the electrons were evenly spread, a density of 0.2 electrons per cubic centimeter would be produced. Because the electrons are moving rapidly, any object within the field would be subjected to impacts of about 1.5×10^{9} electrons per second per square centimeter. These impacts cause the electrons to slow down, which, through bremsstrahlung, releases radiation into the object. The rate of bremsstrahlung depends on the relative atomic mass, or Z, of the material. For an object with an average Z of 10, (Note: Which may seem low for an object made of metal, but a space capsule is mostly open space inside.) the resulting flux is about 100 roentgen/hour, compared to the median lethal dose of about 450 roentgen. Christofilos noted that this would be a significant risk to space travelers and their electronic equipment.

As reentry vehicles (RVs) from ICBMs approach their targets, they travel at about 8 kilometers per second (5 mi/s), or around 28,000 kilometers per hour (17,000 mph). An RV traveling through the mirror layer, where the electrons are at their densest, would thus be in the midst of the electric field for about ten seconds. Because of a warhead's high speed, the apparent voltage spike would induce an enormous current in any of its metal components. This might be so high as to melt the airframe, but more realistically, could destroy the trigger or guidance mechanisms. (Note: Christofilos' 1959 paper on the topic frames the discussion in terms of space safety. It mentions the issue of the radiation field, but ignores any of the electrical effects on warheads.)

The density of the field is greatest at the mirror points, of which there are always two for a given explosion, the so-called magnetic conjugates. The explosion can take place at either of these two points, and the magnetic field will cause them to concentrate at the other point as well. Christofilos noted that the conjugate point for most of the continental United States is in the South Pacific, far west of Chile, where such explosions would not be noticed. Thus, if one were to explode a series of such bombs in these locations, a massive radiation belt would form over the US, which might disable the warheads of a Soviet attack.

Of additional interest to military planners was the possibility of using this effect as an offensive weapon. In the case of an attack by US forces on the Soviet Union, the southern conjugate locations are generally in the Indian Ocean, where they would not be seen by Soviet early warning radar. A series of explosions would cause a massive radar blackout over Russia, degrading its anti-ballistic missile (ABM) system without warning. Since these effects were expected to endure for up to five minutes, about the amount of time that a line-of-sight radar in Russia would have to see the warheads, careful timing of the attack could render the ABM system useless.

== History ==
=== Background ===
Christofilos began his career in physics while reading journal articles at an elevator company during the Axis occupation of Greece when he had little else to do. In the post-war era, he started an elevator repair service, during which time he began to develop the concept today known as strong focusing, a key development in the history of particle accelerators. In 1949, he sent a letter describing the idea to the Berkeley Lab but they rejected it after finding a minor error. In 1952, the idea was developed independently at the Brookhaven National Laboratory, which published on the topic. Convinced they had stolen the idea, Christofilos traveled to the US where he managed to win a job at Brookhaven.

Christofilos soon became more interested in nuclear fusion efforts than particle accelerator design. At the time there were three primary designs being actively worked on in the US program, the magnetic mirror, the stellarator, and the z-pinch. The mirror was often viewed unfavorably due to its inherent leakiness, a side effect of its open field lines. Christofilos developed a new concept to address this problem, known as the Astron. This consisted of a mirror with an associated particle accelerator that injected electrons outside the traditional mirror area. Their rapid movement formed a second magnetic field which mixed with that of the electromagnet and caused the resulting net field to "close", fixing the mirror's biggest problem.

=== Sputnik and Explorer ===
During the same period, plans were being made by the US to test the presence of the expected charged layer directly using the Explorer 1 satellite as part of the International Geophysical Year (IGY). Before Explorer launched, the Soviets surprised everyone by launching Sputnik 1 in October 1957. This event caused near-panic in US defense circles, where many concluded the Soviets had achieved an insurmountable scientific lead.

Among those worried about the Soviet advances was Christofilos, who published his idea in an internal memo that same month. When Explorer launched in January 1958, it confirmed the existence of what became known as the Van Allen radiation belts. This led to new panic within the defense establishment when some concluded that the Van Allen belts were not due to the Sun's particles, but secret Soviet high-altitude nuclear tests of the Christofilos concept.

=== Planning begins ===
Christofilos' idea immediately sparked intense interest; if the concept worked in practice, the US would have a "magic bullet" that might render the Soviet ICBM fleet useless. In February 1958, James Rhyne Killian, chairman of the recently formed President's Science Advisory Committee (PSAC), convened a working group at Livermore to explore the concept. The group agreed that the basic concept was sound, but many practical issues could only be solved by direct testing with explosions at high altitudes.

By that time, planning for the 1958 nuclear testing series, Operation Hardtack I, was already nearing completion. This included several high-altitude explosions launched over the South Pacific testing range. As these were relatively close to the equator, the proper injection point for the magnetic field was at a relatively high altitude, far higher than the 75 kilometres (47 mi) of Shot Teak. This would limit the usefulness of these explosions for testing the Christofilos effect. A new series of explosions to test the effect would be needed.

Adding to the urgency of the planning process was the ongoing negotiations in Geneva between the US and the USSR to arrange what eventually became the Partial Nuclear Test Ban Treaty. At the time, it appeared that a test ban might come into place in the northern-hemisphere fall of 1958. The Soviets would react negatively if the US began high-altitude tests while negotiations were taking place. The planners were given the task of completing the tests by 1 September 1958.

The launch of Sputnik also resulted in the formation of the Advanced Research Projects Agency (ARPA) in February 1958, initially with the mission of centralizing the various US missile development projects. Its charter was soon expanded to consider the topic of defense in general, especially defense against missile attack that Sputnik made clear was a real possibility. ARPA's scientific director, Herbert York, formed a blue-ribbon committee under the name "Project 137" to "identify problems not now receiving adequate attention". The twenty-two man committee of who's-who in the physics world was chaired by John Archibald Wheeler, who popularized the term black hole.

York briefed President Eisenhower on the Christofilos concept and, on 6 March 1958, received a go-ahead to run a separate test series. Intense planning was carried out over the next two months. Christofilos did not have Q clearance and could not be part of the planning. The Project 137 group nevertheless arranged for Christofilos to meet with them at Fort McNair on 14 July 1958 for a discussion of the plans.

=== Testing ===
To achieve the September deadline, weapons and equipment would need to be drawn as much as possible from existing stocks. This resulted in the only suitable launcher being the Lockheed X-17, which was under production for reentry testing and was available in some quantity. Unfortunately, the X-17's limited altitude capability meant it could not reach the required altitude to hit mirror points in the South Pacific over the testing grounds. The only area that had a field low enough for the X-17 to hit easily was the South Atlantic Anomaly, where the Van Allen Belt descends as low as 200 kilometers (660,000 ft).

Planning for tests normally took a year or more, which is why tests normally occurred in closely spaced "series". In contrast, Operation Argus tests went from initial approval by the President on 6 March 1958 to actual tests in only five months. Among other firsts, the tests were to be kept entirely secret from start to after completion, were the first ballistic missile tests from a ship at sea, and were the only atmospheric nuclear test operation in the Atlantic Ocean. The final plans were approved by the President on 1 May 1958.

To measure the effect, Explorer IV and Explorer V were launched in August, although only IV reached orbit. Operation Argus was carried out in late August and early September 1958. Three low-yield atomic bombs were detonated over the south Atlantic at a height of 480 kilometers (300 mi). The bombs released charged particles that behaved exactly as Christofilos had predicted, being trapped along the lines of force. Those that managed to get far enough into the atmosphere to the north and south set up a small magnetic storm.

=== Outcome ===
These tests demonstrated that the possibility of using the effect as a defensive system did not work. However, exact details on the lack of effectiveness remain absent in available sources. Most references state that the effect did not last long enough to be useful, with an ARPA report concluding that it "dissipated rapidly" and would thus have little value as an anti-warhead system. However, other sources state that the effect persisted for over six days on the last test.

=== Public release ===
Late in June 1958, Hanson Baldwin, a Pulitzer Prize-winning military correspondent at The New York Times, received tantalizing hints of a major US military operation. It is now believed that this leaked from the University of Iowa lab run by James Van Allen, which was working with ARPA on Argus throughout this period. Baldwin asked his science reporter colleague Walter Sullivan about the matter. Sullivan spoke to Richard Porter, chair of the IGY Panel on Rockets and Satellites, who was "horrified" by how much information Baldwin had found out. An hour after speaking to Porter, Sullivan received a call from ARPA, asking him to hold the story until the tests were complete.

By the end of the year, with the tests over and the concept largely abandoned, Christofilos was able to talk about the concept openly at an October 1958 meeting of the American Physical Society, leaving out only the detail that an atomic bomb would be used to create the radiation. At the December meeting of the American Association for the Advancement of Science, Sullivan heard that a paper on the topic, titled "Artificial Modification of the Earth's Radiation Belt", was being readied for publication. Sullivan and Baldwin realized they were about to lose their "scoop", so Sullivan wrote to York asking for clearance as it was clear other reporters were learning of the tests. York discussed the matter with James Killian, chair of the Presidents Science Advisory Committee (PSAC), who added that Van Allen was also pressing hard for publication rights.

Sullivan later drove home his point about the information coming out anyway by calling the IGY monitoring stations and asking about records for aurora during August and September. He was told there was a "rather remarkable event" that did not correspond to any known solar storm. He sent another letter to York, noting that the hints about the project were already public and were simply waiting for someone to connect the dots. York called him to the Pentagon and asked him again to hold off. Sullivan concluded this was no longer due to military necessity but was political; the test ban negotiations were ongoing and the sudden release of news the US had performed new tests in space would be a serious problem. Sullivan and Baldwin once again sat on the story.

In February 1959, Killian was in New York giving a speech. Sullivan attended and at the end handed him a letter. The two sat down and Killian read it. The letter outlined the fact that an increasing amount of information was leaking about the tests and that the Times had been patiently waiting on approval from the Pentagon that appeared not to be forthcoming. Meanwhile, scientists working on the project were becoming increasingly vocal about the publication of the data, and a late February meeting of the Argus scientists and managers resulted in arguments. At a PSAC meeting, Killian finally agreed to release the data at the April meeting of the National Academy of Sciences, but still did not tell the Times.

Baldwin and Sullivan had had enough; they went to the top of the Times hierarchy, publisher Arthur Hays Sulzberger, president Orvil E. Dryfoos, and managing editor Turner Catledge, who approved publication. On 18 March 1959, Sullivan tried to call Killian but reached his assistant instead, while Baldwin spoke with ARPA director Roy Johnson. The two wrote the story that night, waiting for the phone call that would again kill the story. The phone never rang and the story was published the next day.

=== Ongoing concerns ===
In 2008, science writer Mark Wolverton noted ongoing concerns about the use of the Christofilos effect as a way to disable satellites.

== See also ==
- Operation Argus
- Operation Fishbowl
- Outer Space Treaty
- Soviet Project K nuclear tests
- Starfish Prime
- Van Allen radiation belt
- List of artificial radiation belts
- Nicholas Christofilos
