= Van Allen radiation belt =

Zone of energetic charged particles around the planet Earth

This CGI video illustrates changes in the shape and intensity of a cross section of the Van Allen belts.

A cross section of Van Allen radiation belts

The Van Allen radiation belt is a zone of energetic charged particles, most of which originate from solar wind, that are captured and held around a planet by that planet's magnetosphere. Earth has two such belts, and sometimes others may be temporarily created. The belts are named after James Van Allen, who published an article describing the belts in 1958.

Earth's two main belts extend from an altitude of about 640 to 58,000 km (400 to 36,040 mi) above the surface, in which region radiation levels vary. The belts are in the inner region of Earth's magnetic field. They trap energetic electrons and protons. Other nuclei, such as alpha particles, are less prevalent. Most of the particles that form the belts are thought to come from the solar wind while others arrive as cosmic rays. By trapping the solar wind, the magnetic field deflects those energetic particles and protects the atmosphere from destruction.

The belts endanger satellites, which must have their sensitive components protected with adequate shielding if they spend significant time near that zone. Apollo astronauts going through the Van Allen belts received a very low and harmless dose of radiation.

In 2013, the Van Allen Probes detected a transient, third radiation belt, which persisted for four weeks.

== Discovery ==
Kristian Birkeland, Carl Størmer, Nicholas Christofilos, and Enrico Medi had investigated the possibility of trapped charged particles in 1895, forming a theoretical basis for the formation of radiation belts. The second Soviet satellite Sputnik 2 which had detectors designed by Sergei Vernov, followed by the US satellites Explorer 1 and Explorer 3, confirmed the existence of the belt in early 1958, later named after James Van Allen from the University of Iowa. The trapped radiation was first mapped by Explorer 4, Pioneer 3, and Luna 1.

The term Van Allen belts refers specifically to the radiation belts surrounding Earth; however, similar radiation belts have been discovered around other planets. The Sun does not support long-term radiation belts, as it lacks a stable, global dipole field. The Earth's atmosphere limits the belts' particles to regions above 200–1,000 km (120–620 mi), while the belts do not extend past 8 Earth radii R_{E}. The belts are confined to a volume which extends about 65° on either side of the celestial equator.

=== Project Argus ===
In 1958 the US detonated low yield nuclear bombs at an altitude of 300 miles, producing a temporary increase in the electron content of the radiation belts. The tests, dubbed Project Argus, were designed to test the Christofilos effect, the idea that nuclear explosions in space would release sufficient electrons trapped in the Earth's magnetic field to disable the warheads on intercontinental ballistic missiles. The project was discontinued due to the treaty banning atmospheric testing and the fear that additional radiation could prevent the Apollo moon mission.

== Research ==
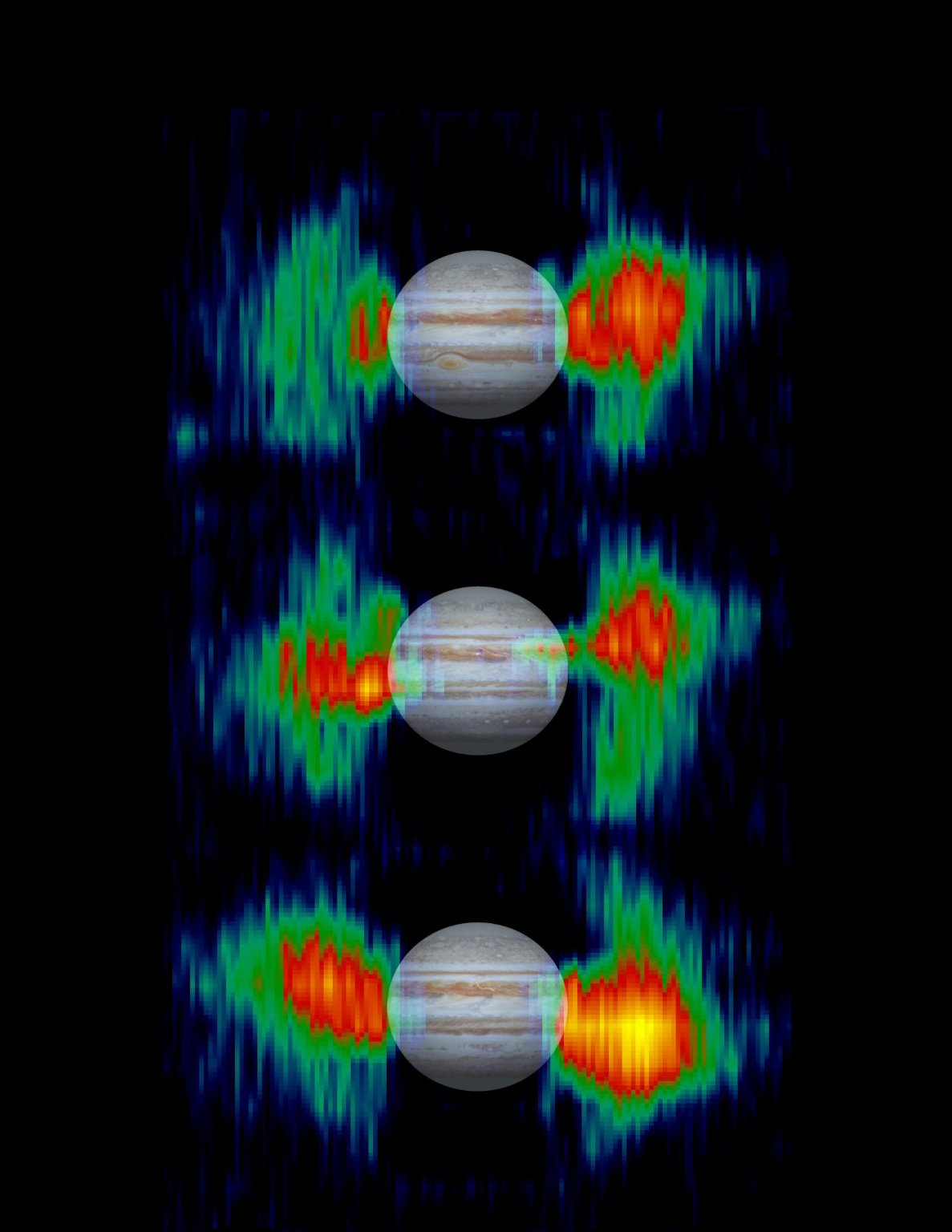
Jupiter's variable radiation belts

The NASA Van Allen Probes mission aims at understanding (to the point of predictability) how populations of relativistic electrons and ions in space form or change in response to changes in solar activity and the solar wind. NASA Institute for Advanced Concepts–funded studies have proposed magnetic scoops to collect antimatter that naturally occurs in the Van Allen belts of Earth, although only about 10 micrograms of antiprotons are estimated to exist in the entire belt.

The Van Allen Probes mission successfully launched on August 30, 2012. The primary mission was scheduled to last two years with expendables expected to last four. The probes were deactivated in 2019 after running out of fuel, and the last one is expected to deorbit during the 2030s. NASA's Goddard Space Flight Center manages the Living With a Star program—of which the Van Allen Probes were a project, along with Solar Dynamics Observatory (SDO). The Applied Physics Laboratory was responsible for the implementation and instrument management for the Van Allen Probes.

Radiation belts exist around other planets and moons in the Solar System that have magnetic fields powerful and stable enough to sustain them. Radiation belts have been detected at Jupiter, Saturn, Uranus and Neptune through in-situ observations, such as by the Galileo and Juno spacecraft at Jupiter, Cassini–Huygens at Saturn, and fly-bys from the Voyager program and Pioneer program. Observations of radio emissions from highly energetic particles that are trapped in a planets magnetic field have also been used to remotely detect radiation belts, including at Jupiter and at the ultracool dwarf LSR J1835+3259. It is possible that Mercury may be able to trap charged particles in its magnetic field, although its highly dynamic magnetosphere (which varies on the order of minutes) may not be able to sustain stable radiation belts. Venus and Mars do not have radiation belts, as their magnetospheric configurations do not trap energetic charged particles in orbit around the planet.

Geomagnetic storms can cause electron density to increase or decrease relatively quickly (i.e., approximately one day or less). Longer-timescale processes determine the overall configuration of the belts. After electron injection increases electron density, electron density is often observed to decay exponentially. Those decay time constants are called "lifetimes." Measurements from the Van Allen Probe B's Magnetic Electron Ion Spectrometer (MagEIS) show long electron lifetimes (i.e., longer than 100 days) in the inner belt; short electron lifetimes of around one or two days are observed in the "slot" between the belts; and energy-dependent electron lifetimes of roughly five to 20 days are found in the outer belt.

== Inner belt ==
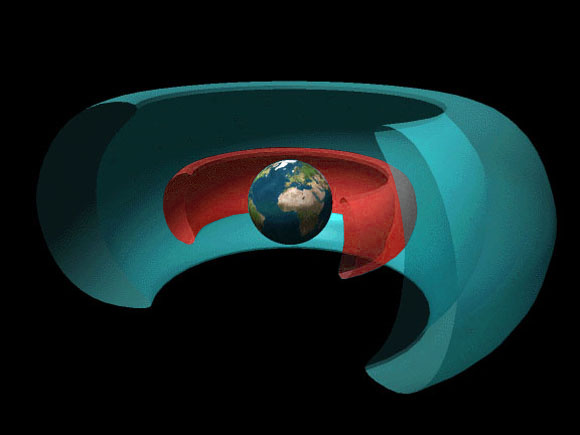
Cutaway drawing of two radiation belts around Earth: the inner belt (red) dominated by protons and the outer one (blue) by electrons. Image Credit: NASA

The inner Van Allen Belt extends typically from an altitude of 0.2 to 2 Earth radii (L values of 1.2 to 3) or 1,000 km (620 mi) to 12,000 km (7,500 mi) above the Earth. In certain cases, when solar activity is stronger or in geographical areas such as the South Atlantic Anomaly, the inner boundary may decline to roughly 200 km above the Earth's surface. The inner belt contains high concentrations of electrons in the range of hundreds of keV and energetic protons with energies exceeding 100 MeV—trapped by the relatively strong magnetic fields in the region (as compared to the outer belt).

It is thought that proton energies exceeding 50 MeV in the lower belts at lower altitudes are the result of the beta decay of neutrons created by cosmic ray collisions with nuclei of the upper atmosphere. The source of lower energy protons is believed to be proton diffusion, due to changes in the magnetic field during geomagnetic storms.

Due to the slight offset of the belts from Earth's geometric center, the inner Van Allen belt makes its closest approach to the surface at the South Atlantic Anomaly.

In March 2014, a pattern resembling "zebra stripes" was observed in the radiation belts by the Radiation Belt Storm Probes Ion Composition Experiment (RBSPICE) onboard Van Allen Probes. The initial theory proposed in 2014 was that—due to the tilt in Earth's magnetic field axis—the planet's rotation generated an oscillating, weak electric field that permeates through the entire inner radiation belt. A 2016 study instead concluded that the zebra stripes were an imprint of ionospheric winds on radiation belts.

== Outer belt ==
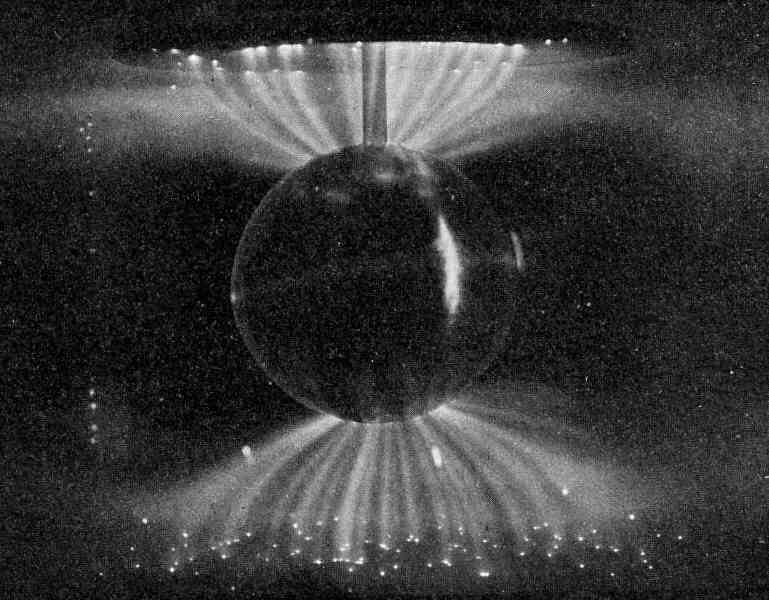
Laboratory simulation of the Van Allen belt's influence on the Solar Wind; these aurora-like Birkeland currents were created by the scientist Kristian Birkeland in his terrella, a magnetized anode globe in an evacuated chamber

The outer belt consists mainly of high-energy (0.1–10 MeV) electrons trapped by the Earth's magnetosphere. It is more variable than the inner belt, as it is more easily influenced by solar activity. It is almost toroidal in shape, beginning at an altitude of 3 Earth radii and extending to 10 Earth radii (R_{E})—13,000 to 60,000 kilometres (8,100 to 37,300 mi) above the Earth's surface. Its greatest intensity is usually around 4 to 5 R_{E}. The outer electron radiation belt is mostly produced by inward radial diffusion and local acceleration due to transfer of energy from whistler-mode plasma waves to radiation belt electrons. Radiation belt electrons are also constantly removed by collisions with Earth's atmosphere, losses to the magnetopause, and their outward radial diffusion. The gyroradii of energetic protons would be large enough to bring them into contact with the Earth's atmosphere. Within this belt, the electrons have a high flux and at the outer edge (close to the magnetopause), where geomagnetic field lines open into the geomagnetic "tail", the flux of energetic electrons can drop to the low interplanetary levels within about 100 km (62 mi)—a decrease by a factor of 1,000.

In 2014, it was discovered that the inner edge of the outer belt is characterized by a very sharp transition, below which highly relativistic electrons (> 5MeV) cannot penetrate. The reason for this shield-like behavior is not well understood.

The trapped particle population of the outer belt is varied, containing electrons and various ions. Most of the ions are in the form of energetic protons, but a certain percentage are alpha particles and O^{+} oxygen ions—similar to those in the ionosphere but much more energetic. This mixture of ions suggests that ring current particles probably originate from more than one source.

The outer belt is larger than the inner belt, and its particle population fluctuates widely. Energetic (radiation) particle fluxes can increase and decrease dramatically in response to geomagnetic storms, which are themselves triggered by magnetic field and plasma disturbances produced by the Sun. The increases are due to storm-related injections and acceleration of particles from the tail of the magnetosphere. Another cause of variability of the outer belt particle populations is the wave-particle interactions with various plasma waves in a broad range of frequencies.

On February 28, 2013, a third radiation belt—consisting of high-energy ultrarelativistic charged particles—was reported to be discovered. In a news conference by NASA's Van Allen Probe team, it was stated that this third belt is a product of coronal mass ejection from the Sun. It has been represented as a separate creation which splits the Outer Belt, like a knife, on its outer side, and exists separately as a storage container of particles for a month's time, before merging once again with the Outer Belt.

The unusual stability of this third, transient belt has been explained as due to a 'trapping' by the Earth's magnetic field of ultrarelativistic particles as they are lost from the second, traditional outer belt. While the outer zone, which forms and disappears over a day, is highly variable due to interactions with the atmosphere, the ultrarelativistic particles of the third belt are thought not to scatter into the atmosphere, as they are too energetic to interact with atmospheric waves at low latitudes. This absence of scattering and the trapping allows them to persist for a long time, finally only being destroyed by an unusual event, such as the shock wave from the Sun.

== Flux values ==
In the belts the flux of particles varies substantially with position, energy, and solar activity. Measured fluxes of protons with enough energy (>20MeV) to penetrate 0.25 mm of aluminum range up to 100,000 per cm^{2} per second. Electrons over 1.5MeV can penetrate that thickness of aluminum and their flux ranges up to a million particles per square centimeter per second.

The proton belts contain protons with kinetic energies ranging from about 100 keV, which can penetrate 0.6 μm of lead, to over 400 MeV, which can penetrate 143 mm of lead.

Radiation levels in the belts would be dangerous to humans if they were exposed for an extended period of time. The Apollo missions minimised hazards for astronauts by sending spacecraft at high speeds through the thinner areas of the upper belts, bypassing inner belts completely, except for the Apollo 14 mission where the spacecraft traveled through the heart of the trapped radiation belts.

Flux values, normal solar conditions

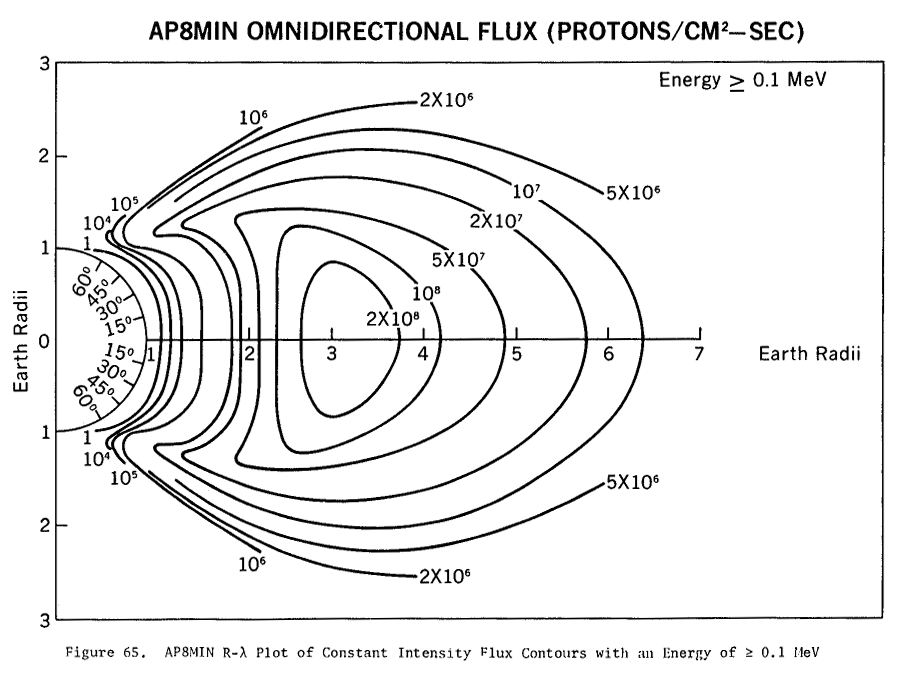
AP8 MIN omnidirectional proton flux ≥ 100 keV

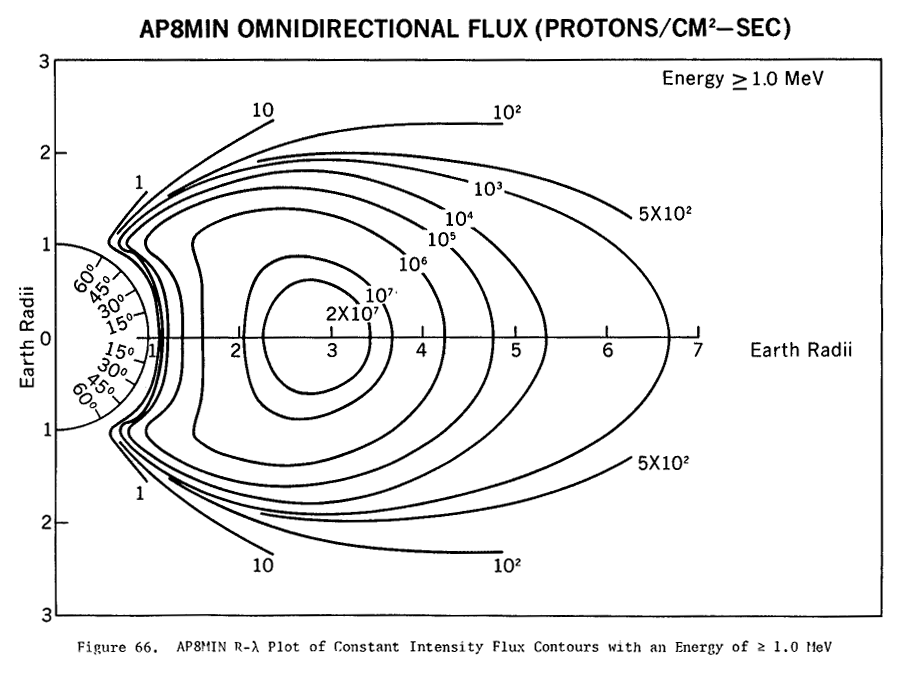
AP8 MIN omnidirectional proton flux ≥ 1 MeV

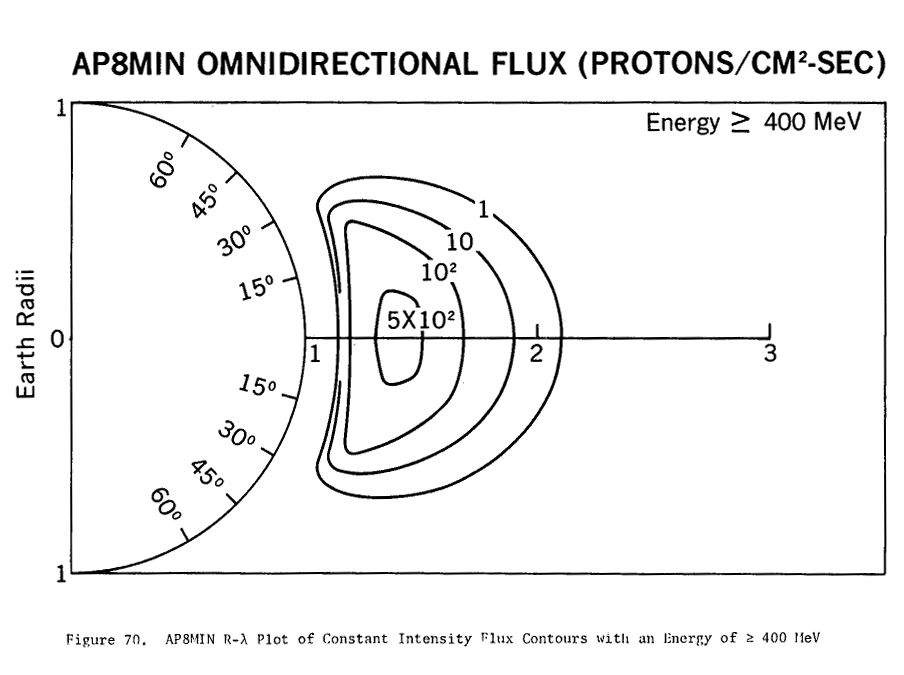
AP8 MIN omnidirectional proton flux ≥ 400 MeV

== Antimatter confinement ==
In 2011, a study confirmed earlier speculation that the Van Allen belt could confine antiparticles. The Payload for Antimatter Matter Exploration and Light-nuclei Astrophysics (PAMELA) experiment detected levels of antiprotons orders of magnitude higher than are expected from normal particle decays while passing through the South Atlantic Anomaly. This suggests the Van Allen belts confine a significant flux of antiprotons produced by the interaction of the Earth's upper atmosphere with cosmic rays. The energy of the antiprotons has been measured in the range from 60 to 750 MeV.

The very high energy released in antimatter annihilation has led to proposals to harness these antiprotons for spacecraft propulsion. The concept relies on the development of antimatter collectors and containers.

== Implications for space travel ==
Clickable image, highlighting medium altitude orbits around Earth, (Note: Orbital periods and speeds are calculated using the relations 4π^{2}R^{3} = T^{2}GM and V^{2}R = GM, where R is the radius of orbit in metres; T is the orbital period in seconds; V is the orbital speed in m/s; G is the gravitational constant, approximately 6.673×10^{−11} Nm^{2}/kg^{2}; M is the mass of Earth, approximately 5.98×10^{24} kg (1.318×10^{25} lb).) from Low Earth to the lowest High Earth orbit (geostationary orbit and its graveyard orbit, at one ninth of the Moon's orbital distance), (Note: Approximately 8.6 times when the Moon is nearest (that is, (363,104 km)/(42,164 km)), to 9.6 times when the Moon is farthest (that is, (405,696 km)/(42,164 km))) with the Van Allen radiation belts and the Earth to scale

Spacecraft travelling beyond low Earth orbit enter the zone of radiation of the Van Allen belts. Beyond the belts, they face additional hazards from cosmic rays and solar particle events. A region between the inner and outer Van Allen belts lies at 2 to 4 Earth radii and is sometimes referred to as the "safe zone".

Solar cells, integrated circuits, and sensors can be damaged by radiation. Geomagnetic storms occasionally damage electronic components on spacecraft. Miniaturization and digitization of electronics and logic circuits have made satellites more vulnerable to radiation, as the total electric charge in these circuits is now small enough so as to be comparable with the charge of incoming ions. Electronics on satellites must be hardened against radiation to operate reliably. The Chandra Space Telescope has its sensors turned off when passing through the Van Allen belts. The INTEGRAL space telescope was placed in an orbit designed to avoid time within the belts.

The Apollo missions marked the first event where humans traveled through the Van Allen belts, which was one of several radiation hazards known by mission planners. The astronauts had low exposure in the Van Allen belts due to the short period of time spent flying through them.

== Causes ==
It is generally understood that the inner and outer Van Allen belts result from different processes. The inner belt is mainly composed of energetic protons produced from the decay of neutrons, which are themselves the result of cosmic ray collisions in the upper atmosphere. The outer Van Allen belt consists mainly of electrons. They are injected from the geomagnetic tail following geomagnetic storms, and are subsequently energized through wave-particle interactions.

In the inner belt, particles that originate from the Sun are trapped in the Earth's magnetic field. Particles spiral along the magnetic lines of flux as they move "latitudinally" along those lines. As particles move toward the poles, the magnetic field line density increases, and their "latitudinal" velocity is slowed and can be reversed, deflecting the particles back towards the equatorial region, causing them to bounce back and forth between the Earth's poles. In addition to both spiralling around and moving along the flux lines, the electrons drift slowly in an eastward direction, while the protons drift westward.

The gap between the inner and outer Van Allen belts is sometimes called the "safe zone" or "safe slot", and is the location of medium Earth orbits. The gap is caused by the VLF radio waves, which scatter particles in pitch angle, which adds new ions to the atmosphere. Solar outbursts can also dump particles into the gap, but those drain out in a matter of days. The VLF radio waves were previously thought to be generated by turbulence in the radiation belts, but recent work by J.L. Green of the Goddard Space Flight Center compared maps of lightning activity collected by the Microlab 1 spacecraft with data on radio waves in the radiation-belt gap from the IMAGE spacecraft; the results suggest that the radio waves are actually generated by lightning within Earth's atmosphere. The generated radio waves strike the ionosphere at the correct angle to pass through only at high latitudes, where the lower ends of the gap approach the upper atmosphere. These results are still being debated in the scientific community.

== Proposed removal ==
Draining the charged particles from the Van Allen belts would open up new orbits for satellites and make travel safer for astronauts. Draining radiation belts around other planets has also been proposed, for example, before exploring Europa, which orbits within Jupiter's radiation belt. Since the radiation belts are part of a complex system, it is unknown if there could be unintended consequences to removing these radiation belts.

One concept proposed to drain and remove the radiation fields of the Van Allen radiation belts that surround the Earth is known as High Voltage Orbiting Long Tether, or HiVOLT, a concept proposed by Russian physicist V. V. Danilov and further refined by Robert P. Hoyt and Robert L. Forward. Another proposal for draining the Van Allen belts involves beaming very-low-frequency (VLF) radio waves from the ground into the Van Allen belts.

== See also ==
- Dipole model of the Earth's magnetic field
- L-shell
- List of artificial radiation belts
- Space weather
- Paramagnetism

== Additional sources ==
- Adams, L.; Daly, E. J.; Harboe-Sorensen, R.; Holmes-Siedle, A. G.; Ward, A. K.; Bull, R. A. (December 1991). "Measurement of SEU and total dose in geostationary orbit under normal and solar flare conditions". IEEE Transactions on Nuclear Science. 38 (6): 1686–1692. Bibcode:1991ITNS...38.1686A. doi:10.1109/23.124163. OCLC 4632198117.
- Holmes-Siedle, Andrew; Adams, Len (2002). Handbook of Radiation Effects (2nd ed.). Oxford; New York: Oxford University Press. ISBN 978-0-19-850733-8. LCCN 2001053096. OCLC 47930537.
- Shprits, Yuri Y.; Elkington, Scott R.; Meredith, Nigel P.; Subbotin, Dmitriy A. (November 2008). "Review of modeling of losses and sources of relativistic electrons in the outer radiation belt". Journal of Atmospheric and Solar-Terrestrial Physics. 70 (14). Part I: Radial transport, pp. 1679–1693, doi:10.1016/j.jastp.2008.06.008; Part II: Local acceleration and loss, pp. 1694–1713, doi:10.1016/j.jastp.2008.06.014.
