= Operation Argus =

Series of 1950s US nuclear tests

- X-17 with nuclear warhead launched from aboard the USS Norton Sound

Information
- Country: United States
- Test site: South Atlantic Ocean
- Period: 1958
- Number of tests: 3
- Test type: space rocket (> 80 km)
- Max. yield: 1.7 kilotonnes of TNT (7.1 TJ)

Test series chronology

Operation Argus was a series of United States low-yield, high-altitude nuclear weapons tests and missile tests secretly conducted from 27 August to 9 September 1958 over the South Atlantic Ocean. The tests were performed by the Defense Nuclear Agency.

The tests were to study the Christofilos effect, which suggested it was possible to defend against Soviet nuclear missiles by exploding a small number of nuclear bombs high over the South Pacific. This would create a disk of electrons over the United States that would overload the electronics on the Soviet warheads as they descended. It was also possible to use the effect to blind Soviet radars, meaning that any Soviet missile-based ABM system would be unable to attack the US counterstrike.

The tests demonstrated that the effect did occur, but that it dissipated too rapidly to be very effective. Papers concerning the topic were published the next year, emphasizing the events as purely scientific endeavors.

== Objectives ==
The tests were proposed by Nicholas Christofilos in an unpublished paper of what was then the Livermore branch of the Lawrence Radiation Laboratory (now Lawrence Livermore National Laboratory) as a means to verify the Christofilos effect, which argued that high-altitude nuclear detonations would create a radiation belt in the extreme upper regions of the Earth's atmosphere. Such belts would be similar in effect to the Van Allen radiation belts. "Such radiation belts were viewed as having possible tactical use in war, including degradation of radio and radar transmissions, damage or destruction of the arming and fuzing mechanisms of ICBM warheads, and endangering the crews of orbiting space vehicles that might enter the belt." Prior to Argus, Hardtack Teak had shown disruption of radio communications from a nuclear blast, though this was not due to the creation of radiation belts.

Argus was implemented rapidly after inception due to forthcoming bans on atmospheric and exoatmospheric testing in October 1958. Consequently, the tests were performed within a mere half-year of conception (whereas "normal" testing took one to two years). Because nuclear testing during this time was arguably a violation of the rules, the military borrowed International Geophysical Year equipment to disguise the nuclear tests.

- Two missiles, with warheads 136–227 kg to be launched within one month of each other, originating from a single site.
- The missiles were to be detonated at altitudes of 200–1,000 miles (320–1,610 km), and also at 2,000–4,000 miles (3,200–6,400 km). Both detonations should occur near the geomagnetic equator.
- Satellites were to be placed in equatorial (up to 30°) and polar (up to 70°) orbits, with perigees of roughly 322 kilometers (200 mi) and apogees of roughly 2,900 kilometers (1,800 mi) or greater. These satellites were to be used to measure electron density over time, and include a magnetometer, as well as a means for measuring ambient radio noise. Measurements were to be taken before the shots to determine a baseline, as well as during and after the events.
- Sounding rockets, launched from appropriate ground locations, were to carry the same instrumentation as the satellites, except for radio noise. Ground stations to be used to study effects on radio astronomy and radar probing as well as auroral measurements.

Originally Argus was designated Hardtack-Argus, and later Floral. For reasons of security, both names were disused in favor of the independent name Argus.

Funding was provided by the Armed Forces Special Weapons Project (AFSWP), the predecessor of the present Defense Threat Reduction Agency (DTRA). Total funds allotted for the project were US$9,023,000.

== Task Force 88 ==
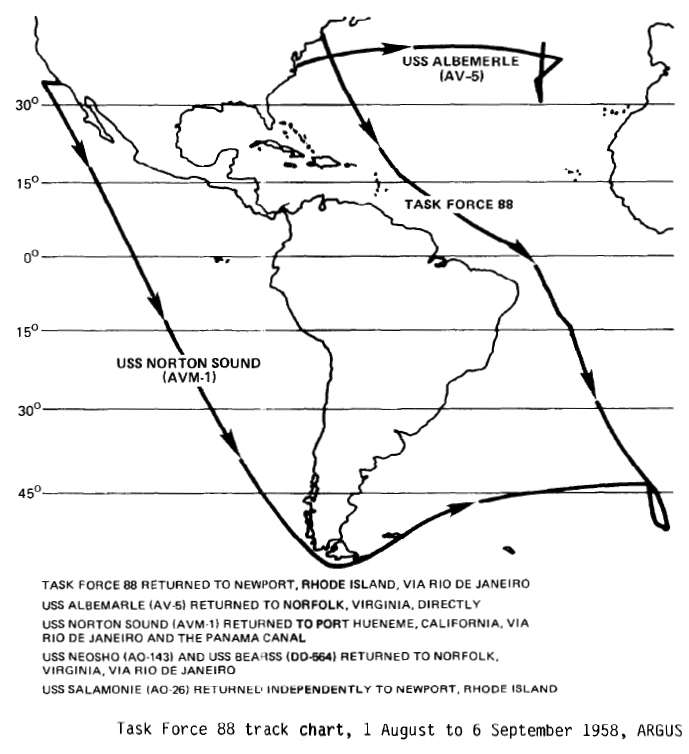
Path of TF-88 during August and September 1958.

The United States Navy Task Force 88 (or TF-88), was formed 28 April 1958. TF-88 was organized solely to conduct Operation Argus. Once Argus was completed, the task force was dissolved, and its records dispersed. Some of these records have been destroyed or lost during the time period intervening. Of particular note among the missing documents were the film records (which recorded radiation levels during the Argus tests). This has proved contentious due to the greater-than-normal number of leukemia claims among TF-88 participants to the Veterans Administration. Because of this, it has been difficult to resolve to how much radiation the participants were exposed.

=== USS Norton Sound ===
USS Norton Sound (AVM-1) was a United States Navy-guided missile ship responsible for missile-launching functions. It also served as a training facility for crews involved in the testing. The X-17A missiles to be used in the test were unfamiliar to those conducting the tests. Exercises including assembly and repair of dummy missiles were performed aboard Norton Sound. It also carried a 27-MHz COZI radar, which was operated by the Air Force Cambridge Research Center, which was used to monitor effects of the shots. It was responsible for the launching of three low-yield nuclear warheads into the high atmosphere. Its commanding officer, Captain Arthur R. Gralla, commanded Task Force 88. Gralla would later receive the Legion of Merit for his role conducting the tests expeditiously.

=== USS Albemarle ===
USS Albemarle, fresh out of an overhaul, was not listed on the TF-88 order. It set out to the Atlantic Ocean, supposedly as a shakedown cruise. It, too, had a COZI radar and other instrumentation for detecting man-made ionization. This instrumentation included International Geophysical Year (IGY) radiometers, receivers, radar, and optical equipment. After the IGY equipment was added, it sailed to the ocean around the area of the Azores to record data at the geomagnetic conjugate point of the South Atlantic test site, as the rest of task force 88 headed to the South Atlantic to perform the tests.

=== USS Tarawa ===
USS Tarawa served as overall command of the operation, with her commander serving as Task Group Commander. It carried an Air Force MSQ-1A radar and communication system for missile tracking. It also housed VS-32 aircraft for search and security operations as well as scientific measurement, photographic, and observer missions for each test. HS-5 was also aboard and provided intra-task-force transportation for personnel and cargo.

=== USS Warrington ===
USS Warrington, in conjunction with Bearss, Hammerberg, and Courtney, maintained a weather picket 250 nautical miles (460 km; 290 mi) west of the task force, provided an airplane guard for Tarawa during flight operations, and performed standard destroyer functions (such as surface security and search and rescue). Warrington also carried equipment for launching Loki Dart sounding rockets.

=== Task Group 88.3 ===
USS Neosho refueled task force ships during the operation. It was also outfitted with Air Force MSQ-1A radar and communication vans. Neosho also served as the flagship for TG 88.3, the Mobile Logistics Group, which consisted of Neosho, USS Salamonie (AO-26), and assigned destroyers.

USS Salamonie returned to the United States upon arrival at TF-88, and did not participate with any tests.

== Satellite tracking ==
Two satellite launches were attempted in order to obtain data from these high-altitude tests. Explorer 4 was launched successfully to orbit on 26 July on Juno I missile from Cape Canaveral. The satellite had enough battery power to function for sixty days. This was long enough for the satellite to track and measure ARGUS. Explorer 5 experienced a launch failure on 24 August.

There were many tracking systems used by the task force along with these satellites along with many organizations that helped track these missiles. "These included the Naval Research Laboratory, the Army Signal Research and Development Laboratory, the Smithsonian Astrophysical Laboratory, the Army Map Service, the Naval Ordnance Test Station, and the Ballistic Research Laboratory along with ground tracking stations from the Aleutian Islands through the Azores from academic, industrial, and military organizations."

== Preparation ==
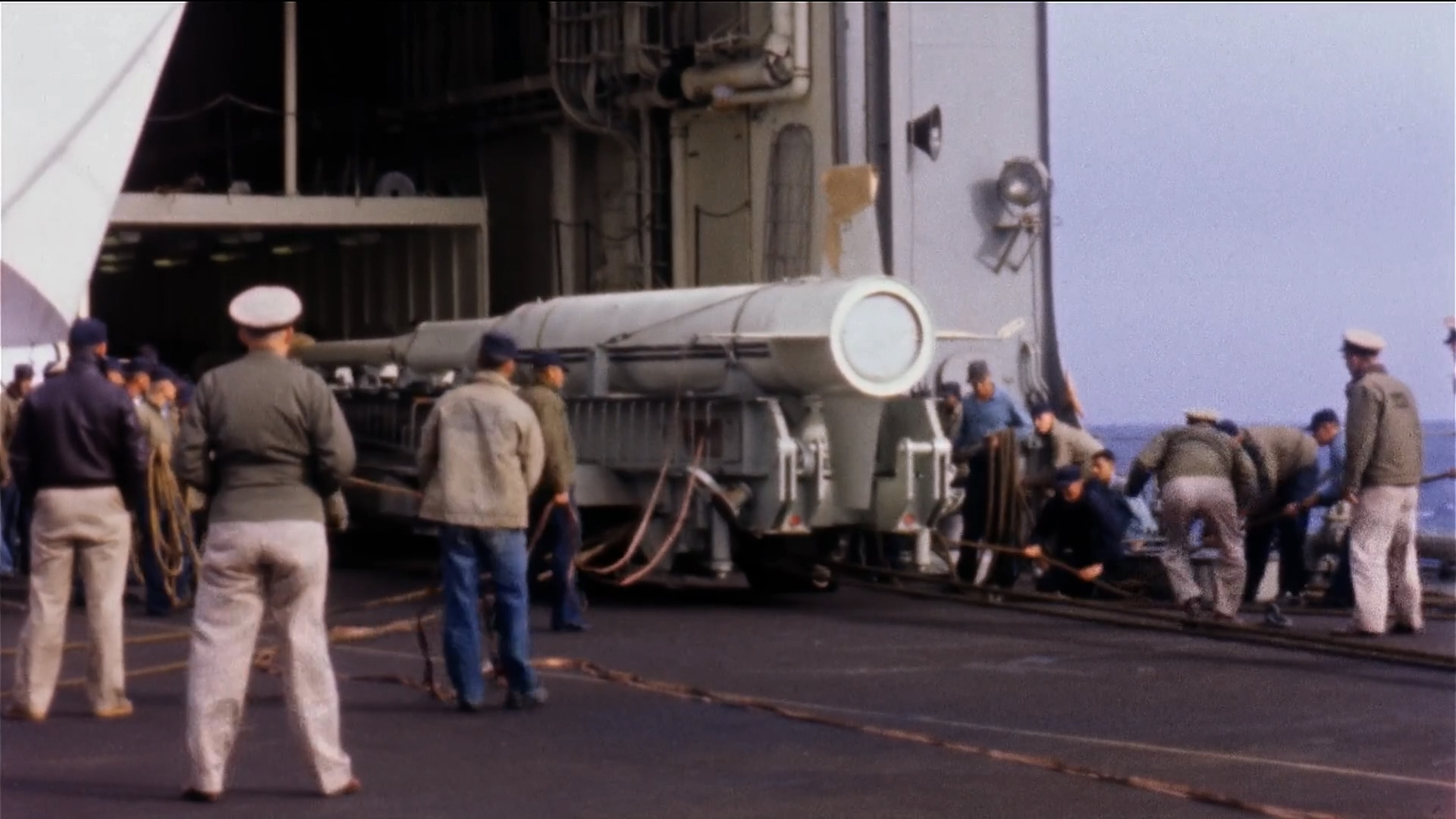
Deployment of X-17A aboard USS-Norton Sound.

To prepare for the launch of the ARGUS missiles, many tests and preparations were performed. As the east coast units of TF 88 were heading towards the South Atlantic, they participated with countdown, launch, and missile- tracking drills using Loki/Dart high-altitude, antiaircraft rockets launched from the USS Warrington. Fourteen of these Loki launches were conducted from 12 to 22 August. These tests were performed to test equipment and procedures, and to train personnel in specialized assignments. Some of these assignments necessary for the ARGUS missile launchings were "stationing of ships, MSQ-1A radar tracking by the USS Neosho and the USS Tarawa, communications, positioning of sky-camera S2F aircraft, and area surveillance S2F aircraft."

== Tests ==
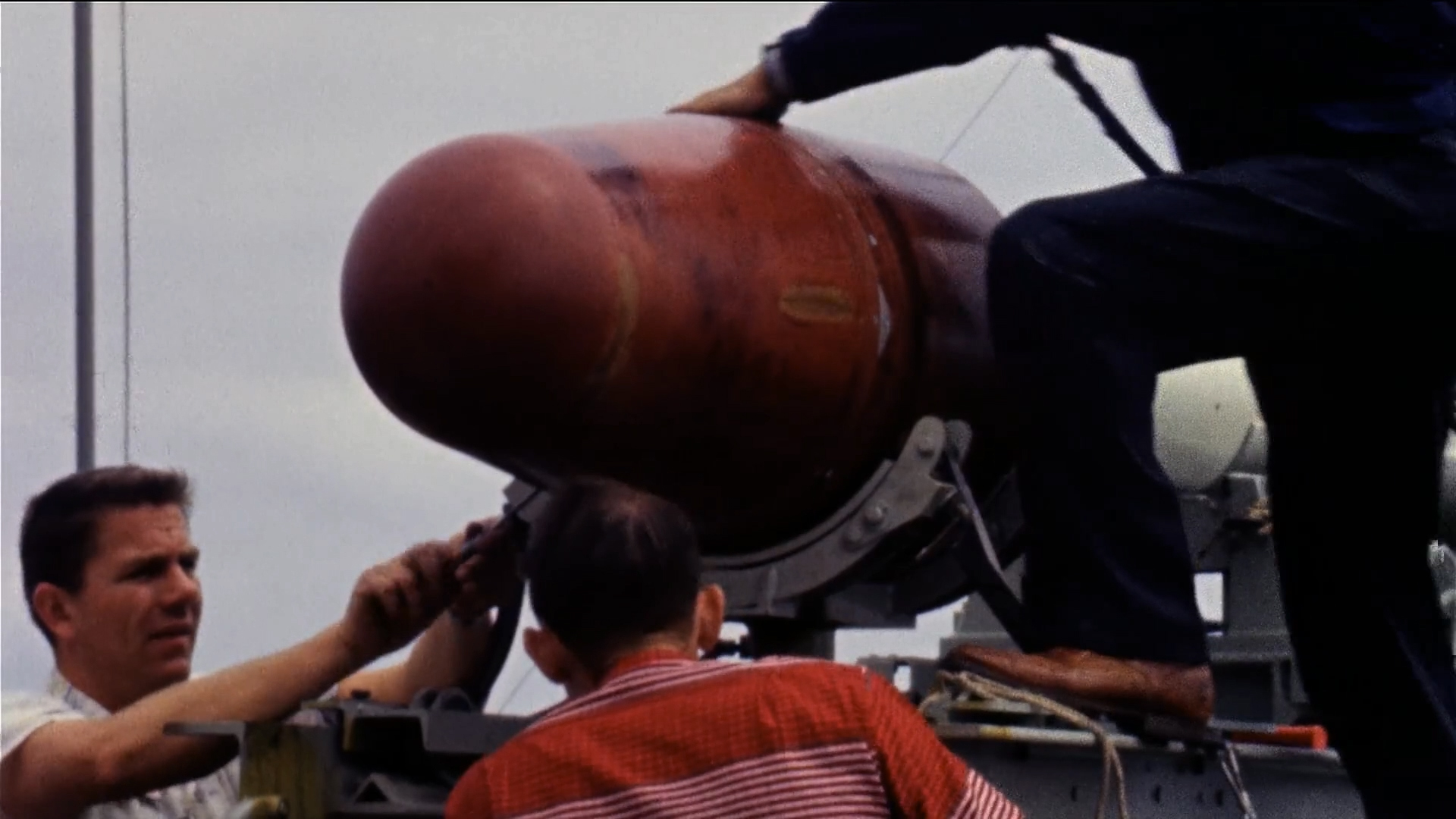
X-17A warhead.

About 1800 km southwest of Cape Town, South Africa, USS Norton Sound launched three modified X-17A missiles armed with 1.7 kt W-25 nuclear warheads into the upper atmosphere, where high altitude nuclear explosions occurred. Due to the South Atlantic Anomaly, the Van Allen radiation belt is closer to the Earth's surface at that location. The (extreme) altitude of the tests was chosen so as to prevent personnel involved with the test from being exposed to any ionizing radiation. Even with the very minor threat of radiation exposure, precautions were taken to prevent radiological exposure. The task force commander and his staff had devised a series of precautionary radiation safe measures to be followed in each stage of the operation. Though the chance of exposure to radiation from these missiles was minute, the safety measures were performed as directed by the commander by the crew of Task Force 88.

Coordinated measurement programs involving satellite, rocket, aircraft, and surface stations were employed by the services as well as other government agencies and various contractors worldwide.

The Argus explosions created artificial electron belts resulting from the β-decay of fission fragments. These lasted for several weeks. Such radiation belts affect radio and radar transmissions, damage or destroy arming and fusing mechanisms of intercontinental ballistic missile warheads, and endanger crews of orbiting space vehicles. It was found after performing these tests that the explosions did in fact degrade the reception and transmission of radar signals, another proof that Christofilos was correct about the Christofilos effect.

Argus proved the validity of Christofilos' theory: the establishment of an electron shell derived from neutron and β-decay of fission products and ionization of device materials in the upper atmosphere was demonstrated. It not only provided data on military considerations, but produced a "great mass" of geophysical data.

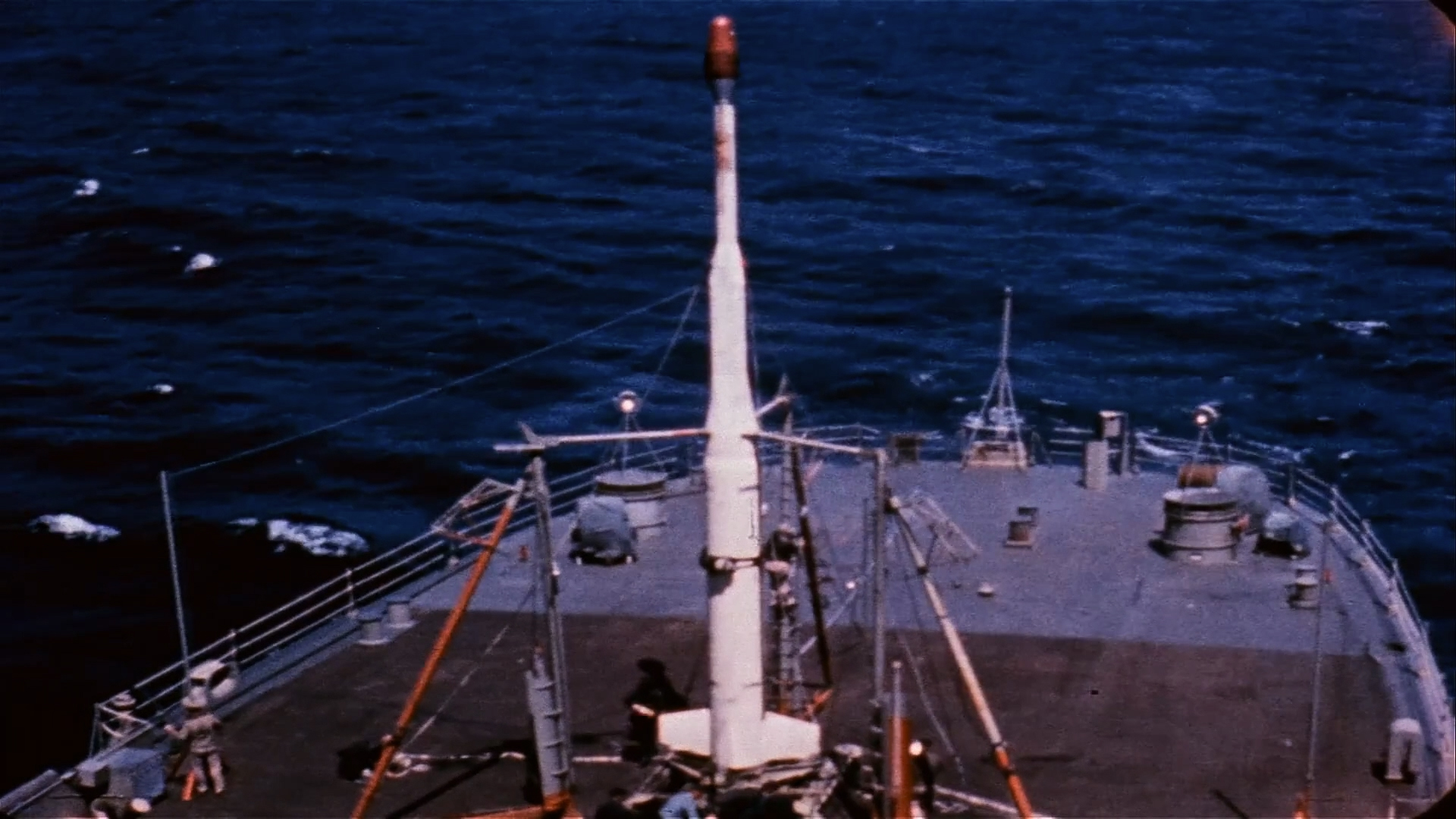
X-17A awaiting launch aboard USS-Norton Sound.

The tests were first reported journalistically by Hanson Baldwin and Walter Sullivan of The New York Times on 19 March 1959, headlining it as the "greatest scientific experiment ever conducted". This was an unauthorized publication that caused great controversy among scientists because many of them were unaware of the presence of artificial particles in the Earth's atmosphere. Approximately nine ships and 4,500 people participated with the operation. After the completion of testing, the task force returned to the United States via Rio de Janeiro, Brazil.

The tests were announced officially the next year, but the full results and documentation of the tests were not declassified until 30 April 1982.

== List of Argus launches ==
United States' Argus series tests and detonations
Name (Note: The US, France and Great Britain have code-named their test events, while the USSR and China did not, and therefore have only test numbers (with some exceptions – Soviet peaceful explosions were named). Word translations into English in parentheses unless the name is a proper noun. A dash followed by a number indicates a member of a salvo event. The US also sometimes named the individual explosions in such a salvo test, which results in "name1 – 1(with name2)". If test is canceled or aborted, then the row data like date and location discloses the intended plans, where known.)	Date time (UT)	Local Time Zone (Note: To convert the UT time into standard local, add the number of hours in parentheses to the UT time; for local daylight saving time, add one additional hour. If the result is earlier than 00:00, add 24 hours and subtract 1 from the day; if it is 24:00 or later, subtract 24 hours and add 1 to the day.)	Location (Note: Rough place name and a latitude/longitude reference; for rocket-carried tests, the launch location is specified before the detonation location, if known. Some locations are extremely accurate; others (like airdrops and space blasts) may be quite inaccurate. "~" indicates a likely pro-forma rough location, shared with other tests in that same area.)	Elevation + height (Note: Elevation is the ground level at the point directly below the explosion relative to sea level; height is the additional distance added or subtracted by tower, balloon, shaft, tunnel, air drop or other contrivance. For rocket bursts the ground level is "N/A". In some cases it is not clear if the height is absolute or relative to ground, for example, Plumbbob/John. No number or units indicates the value is unknown, while "0" means zero. Sorting on this column is by elevation and height added together.)	Delivery (Note: Atmospheric, airdrop, balloon, gun, cruise missile, rocket, surface, tower, and barge are all disallowed by the Partial Nuclear Test Ban Treaty. Sealed shaft and tunnel are underground, and remained useful under the PTBT. Intentional cratering tests are borderline; they occurred under the treaty, were sometimes protested, and generally overlooked if the test was declared to be a peaceful use.) Purpose (Note: Include weapons development, weapon effects, safety test, transport safety test, war, science, joint verification and industrial/peaceful, which may be further broken down.)	Device (Note: Designations for test items where known, "?" indicates some uncertainty about the preceding value, nicknames for particular devices in quotes. This category of information is often not officially disclosed.)	Yield (Note: Estimated energy yield in tons, kilotons, and megatons. A ton of TNT equivalent is defined as 4.184 gigajoules (1,162 kWh).)	Fallout (Note: Radioactive emission to the atmosphere aside from prompt neutrons, where known. The measured species is only iodine-131 if mentioned, otherwise it is all species. No entry means unknown, probably none if underground and "all" if not; otherwise notation for whether measured on the site only or off the site, where known, and the measured amount of radioactivity released.)	References	Notes
1	August 27, 1958 02:28:??	WET (0 hrs)	Launch from South Atlantic Ocean 38.5°S 11.5°W, elv: 0 + 0 m (0 + 0 ft); Detonation over South Atlantic Ocean 38.5°S 11.5°W	N/A + 170 kilometers (110 mi)	space rocket (> 80 km), weapon effect	W-25	1.7 kilotonnes of TNT (7.1 TJ)			
2	August 30, 1958 03:18:??	WET (0 hrs)	Launch from South Atlantic Ocean 49.5°S 8.2°W, elv: 0 + 0 m (0 + 0 ft); Detonation over South Atlantic Ocean 49.5°S 8.2°W	N/A + 310 kilometers (190 mi)	space rocket (> 80 km), weapon effect	W-25	1.7 kilotonnes of TNT (7.1 TJ)			
3	September 6, 1958 22:13:??	WET (0 hrs)	Launch from South Atlantic Ocean 48.5°S 9.7°W, elv: 0 + 0 m (0 + 0 ft); Detonation over South Atlantic Ocean 48.5°S 9.7°W	N/A + 794 kilometers (493 mi)	space rocket (> 80 km), weapon effect	W-25	1.7 kilotonnes of TNT (7.1 TJ)			

== List of ships involved in Operation Argus ==
- USS Tarawa (CVS-40)
- USS Bearss (DD-654)
- USS Warrington (DD-843)
- USS Courtney (DE-1021)
- USS Hammerberg (DE-1015)
- USS Neosho (AO-143)
- USS Salamonie (AO-26)
- USS Norton Sound (AVM-1)
- USS Albemarle (AV-5)

== See also ==
- Hardtack Teak
- Operation Dominic I and II
- HAARP
- List of artificial radiation belts
- Aurora § Conjugate auroras
