= Explorer 1 =

First satellite launched by the United States (1958)

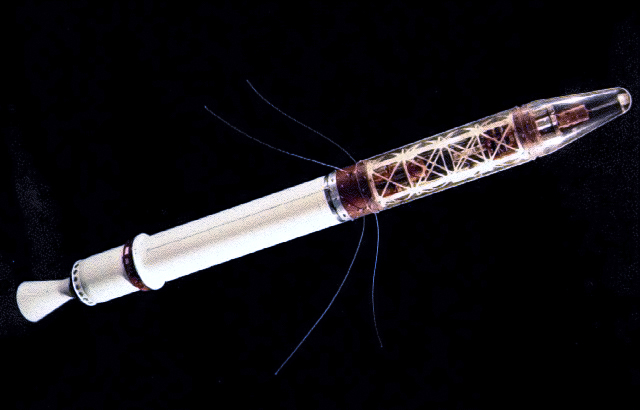
- Explorer 1 in its orbital configuration, with the launch vehicle's fourth stage attached
- Names: Explorer I 1958 Alpha 1
- Mission type: Earth science
- Operator: JPL / ABMA
- Harvard designation: 1958 Alpha 1
- COSPAR ID: 1958-001A
- SATCAT no.: 00004
- Mission duration: 120 days (planned); 111 days (achieved)

Spacecraft properties
- Spacecraft: Explorer I
- Spacecraft type: Science Explorer
- Bus: Explorer 1
- Manufacturer: Jet Propulsion Laboratory
- Launch mass: 13.97 kg (30.8 lb)
- Dimensions: 203 cm (80 in) length 15.2 cm (6.0 in) diameter
- Power: 60 watts

Start of mission
- Launch date: 1 February 1958, 03:47:56 GMT
- Rocket: Juno I (RS-29)
- Launch site: Atlantic Missile Range, LC-26A
- Contractor: Army Ballistic Missile Agency
- Entered service: 1 February 1958

End of mission
- Last contact: 23 May 1958
- Decay date: 31 March 1970

Orbital parameters
- Reference system: Geocentric orbit
- Regime: Medium Earth orbit
- Perigee altitude: 358 km (222 mi)
- Apogee altitude: 2,550 km (1,580 mi)
- Inclination: 33.24°
- Period: 114.80 minutes
- Revolution no.: 58402

Instruments
- Cosmic-Ray Detector; Micrometeorite Detector; Resistance Thermometers; Satellite Drag Atmospheric Density

Explorer 1 was the first satellite launched by the United States and was part of the U.S. participation in the International Geophysical Year (IGY). The 1958 mission followed the first two satellites, both launched by the Soviet Union during the previous year, Sputnik 1 and Sputnik 2. This began a Space Race during the Cold War between the two nations.

Explorer 1 was launched on 1 February 1958 at 03:47:56 GMT (or 31 January 1958 at 22:47:56 Eastern Time) atop the first Juno I booster from LC-26A at the Cape Canaveral Missile Test Center of the Atlantic Missile Range (AMR), in Florida. It was the first spacecraft to detect the Van Allen radiation belt, returning data until its batteries were exhausted after nearly four months. It remained in orbit until 1970.

Explorer 1 was given Satellite Catalog Number 00004 and the Harvard designation 1958 Alpha 1, the forerunner to the modern International Designator.

== Background ==
The U.S. Earth satellite program began in 1954 as a joint U.S. Army and U.S. Navy proposal, called Project Orbiter, to put a scientific satellite into orbit during the International Geophysical Year. The proposal, using a military Redstone missile, was rejected in 1955 by the Eisenhower administration in favor of the Navy's Project Vanguard, using a booster advertised as more civilian in nature. Following the launch of the Soviet satellite Sputnik 1 on 4 October 1957, the initial Project Orbiter program was revived as the Explorer program to catch up with the Soviet Union.

Explorer 1 was designed and built by the Jet Propulsion Laboratory (JPL), while a Jupiter-C rocket was modified by the Army Ballistic Missile Agency (ABMA) to accommodate a satellite payload; the resulting rocket known as the Juno I. The Jupiter-C design used for the launch had already been flight-tested in nose cone reentry tests for the Jupiter intermediate-range ballistic missile (IRBM) and was modified into Juno I. Working closely together, ABMA and JPL completed the job of modifying the Jupiter-C and building Explorer 1 in 84 days. However, before work was completed, the Soviet Union launched a second satellite, Sputnik 2, on 3 November 1957. The U.S. Navy attempted to put the first U.S. satellite into orbit but failed with the launch of the Vanguard TV-3 on 6 December 1957.

== Spacecraft ==
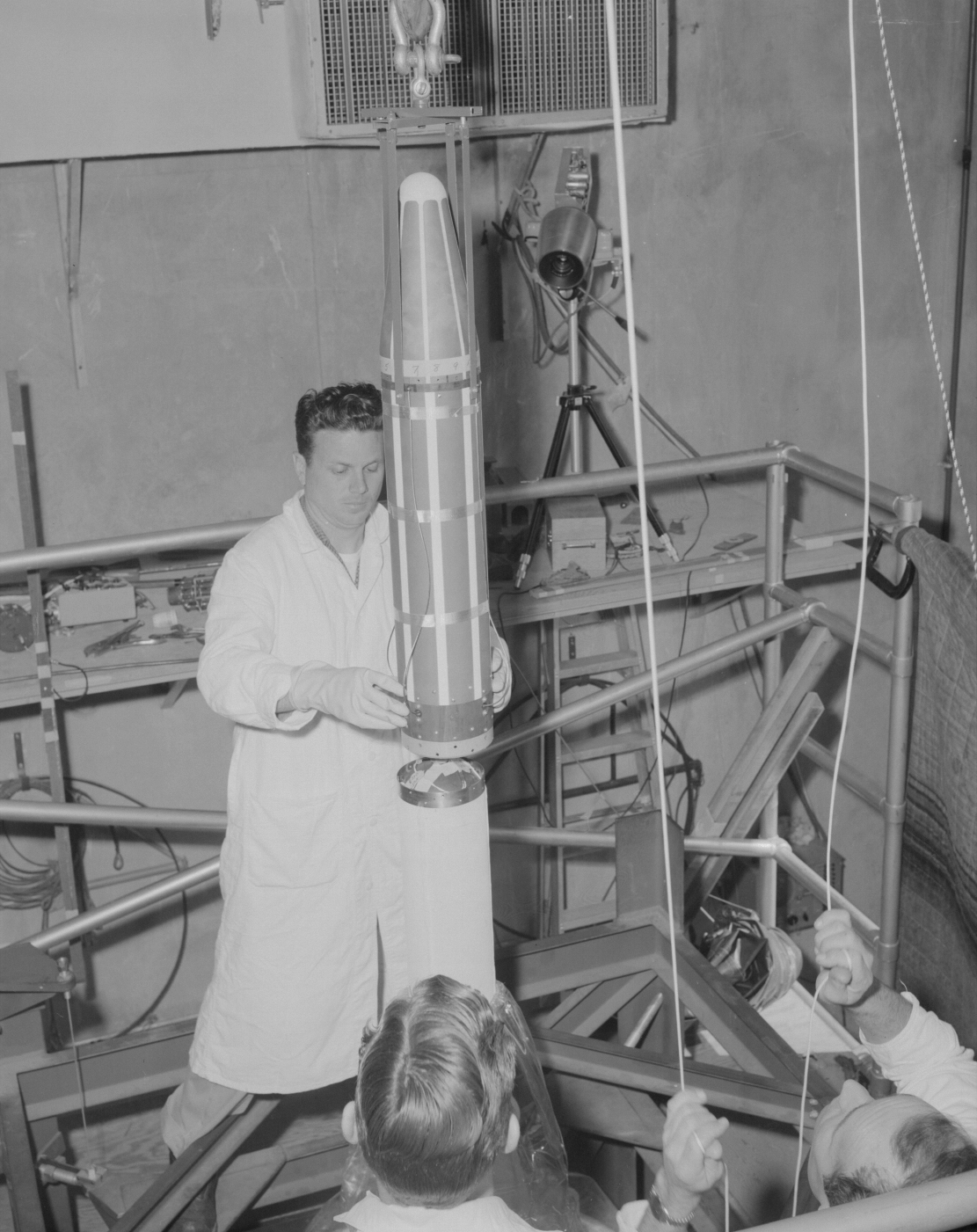
The instrument section of Explorer 1 is mated to its solid motor at spin test facility.

Explorer 1 was designed and built by California Institute of Technology's JPL under the direction of Dr. William Hayward Pickering. It was the second satellite to carry a mission payload (Sputnik 2 was the first).

The total mass of the satellite was 13.97 kg (30.8 lb), of which 8.3 kg (18 lb) were instrumentation. In comparison, the mass of the first Soviet satellite Sputnik 1 was 83.6 kg (184 lb). The instrument section at the front end of the satellite and the empty scaled-down fourth-stage rocket casing orbited as a single unit, spinning around its long axis at 750 revolutions per minute.

Data from the scientific instruments was transmitted to the ground by two antennas. A 60 milliwatt transmitter fed a dipole antenna consisting of two fiberglasses slot antennas in the body of the satellite operating on 108.03 MHz, and four flexible whips forming a turnstile antenna were fed by a 10 milliwatt transmitter operating on 108.00 MHz.

Because of the limited space available and the requirements for low weight, the payload instrumentation was designed and built with simplicity and high reliability in mind, using germanium and silicon transistors in its electronics. A total of 20 transistors were used in Explorer 1, plus additional ones in the Army's micrometeorite amplifier. Electrical power was provided by mercury chemical batteries that made up approximately 40% of the payload weight.

The external skin of the instrument section was sandblasted stainless steel with white stripes. Several other color schemes had been tested, resulting in backup articles, models, and photographs showing different configurations, including alternate white and green striping and blue stripes alternating with copper. The final color scheme was determined by studies of shadow–sunlight intervals based on firing time, trajectory, orbit and inclination.

== Science payload ==
Universal Newsreel about the satellite

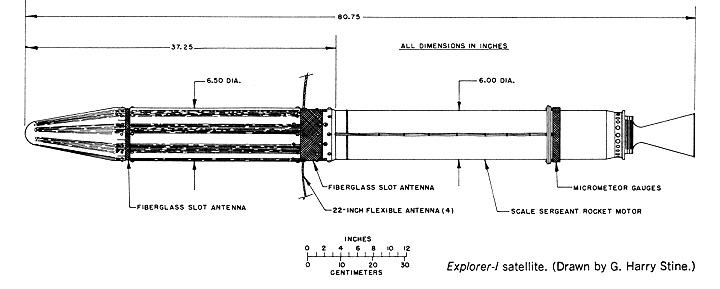
Explorer 1 schematic

The Explorer 1 payload consisted of the Iowa Cosmic Ray Instrument without a tape data recorder which was not modified in time to make it onto the spacecraft. The real-time data received on the ground was therefore very sparse and puzzling showing normal counting rates and no counts at all. The later Explorer 3 mission, which included a tape data recorder in the payload, provided the additional data for confirmation of the earlier Explorer 1 data.

The scientific instrumentation of Explorer 1 was designed and built under the direction of Dr. James Van Allen of the University of Iowa containing:

- Anton 314 omnidirectional Geiger–Müller tube, designed by Dr. George H. Ludwig of Iowa's Cosmic Ray Laboratory, to detect cosmic rays. It could detect protons with E>30 MeV and electrons with E>3 MeV. Most of the time the instrument was saturated;
- Five temperature sensors (one internal, three external and one on the nose cone);
- Acoustic detector (crystal transducer and solid-state amplifier) to detect micrometeorite (cosmic dust) impacts. It responded to micrometeorite impacts on the spacecraft skin in such a way that each impact would be a function of mass and velocity. Its effective area was 0.075 m^{2} and the average threshold sensitivity was 2.5×10^{−3} g cm/s;
- Wire grid detector, also to detect micrometeorite impacts. It consisted of 12 parallel connected cards mounted in a fiberglass supporting ring. Each card was wound with two layers of enameled nickel alloy wire with a diameter of 17 μm (21 μm with the enamel insulation included) in such way that a total area of 1 × 1 cm (0.39 × 0.39 in) was completely covered. If a micrometeorite of about 10 μm impacted, it would fracture the wire, destroy the electrical connection, and thus record the event.

== Flight ==
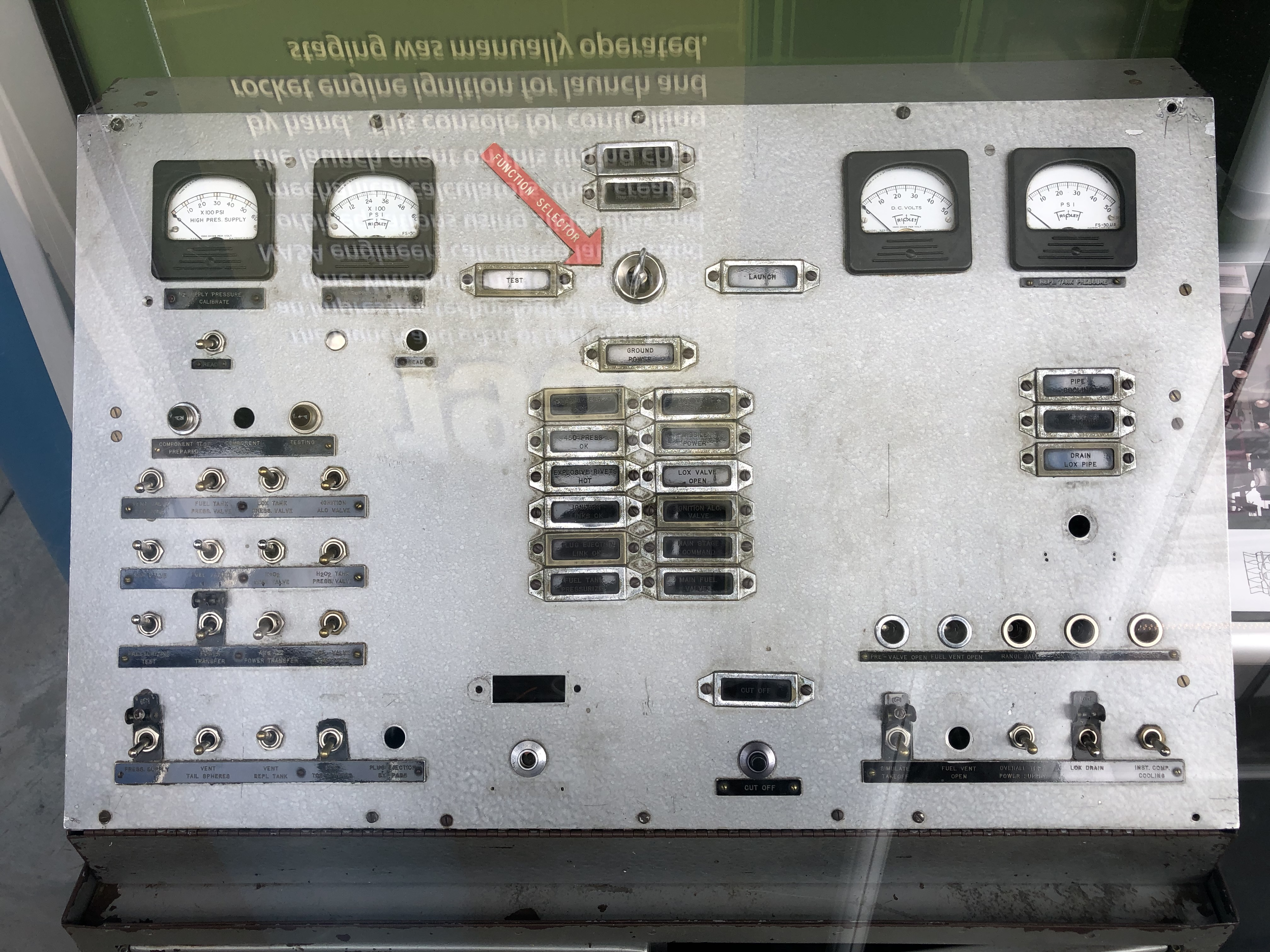
Explorer 1 launch control console on display at Huntsville Space and Rocket Center. The red arrow points to the manually turned launch key switch.

After a jet stream-related delay on 28 January 1958, at 03:47:56 GMT on 1 February 1958 the Juno I rocket was launched, putting Explorer 1 into orbit with a perigee of 358 km (222 mi) and an apogee of 2,550 km (1,580 mi) having a period of 114.80 minutes, and an inclination of 33.24°. Goldstone Tracking Station could not report after 90 minutes as planned whether the launch had succeeded because the orbit was larger than expected. At about 06:30 GMT, after confirming that Explorer 1 was indeed in orbit, a news conference was held in the Great Hall at the National Academy of Sciences in Washington, D.C. to announce it to the world.

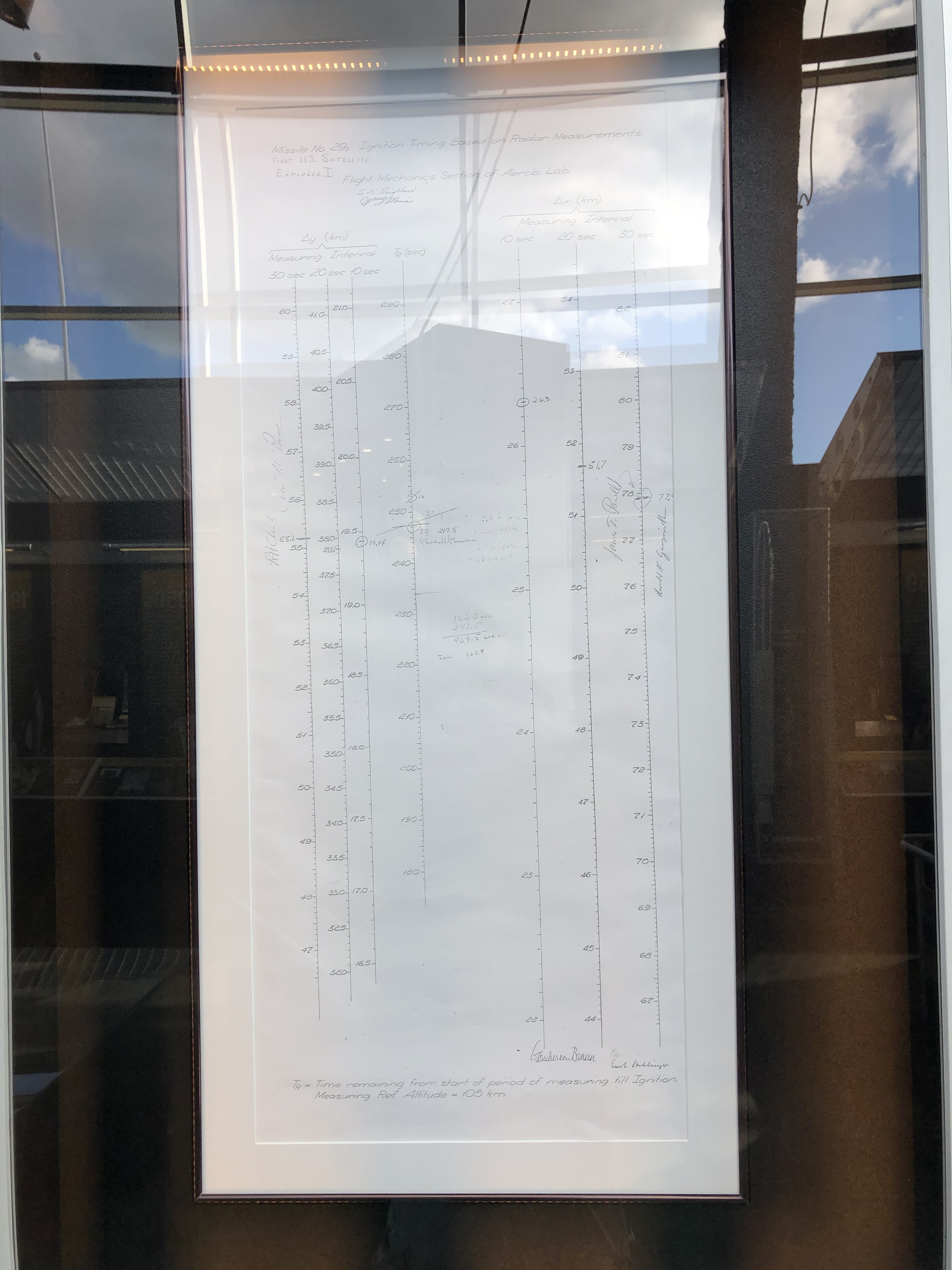
Hand drawn Explorer 1 mission plot

The original expected lifetime of the satellite before orbital decay was three years. Mercury batteries powered the high-power transmitter for 31 days and the low-power transmitter for 105 days. Explorer 1 stopped transmission of data on 23 May 1958, when its batteries died, but remained in orbit for more than 12 years. It reentered the atmosphere over the Pacific Ocean on 31 March 1970 after more than 58,400 orbits.

== Results ==
Explorer 1 changed rotation axis after launch. The elongated body of the spacecraft had been designed to spin about its long (least-inertia) axis but refused to do so, and instead started precessing due to energy dissipation from flexible structural elements. Later it was understood that on general grounds, the body ends up in the spin state that minimizes the kinetic rotational energy for a fixed angular momentum (this being the maximal-inertia axis). This motivated the first further development of the Eulerian theory of rigid body dynamics after nearly 200 years – to address this kind of momentum-preserving energy dissipation.

Sometimes the instrumentation reported the expected cosmic ray count (approximately 30 counts per second) but other times it would show a peculiar zero counts per second. The University of Iowa (under James Van Allen) observed that all of the zero counts per second reports were from an altitude of more than 2,000 km (1,200 mi) over South America, while passes at 500 km (310 mi) would show the expected level of cosmic rays. Later, after Explorer 3, it was concluded that the original Geiger counter had been overwhelmed ("saturated") by strong radiation coming from a belt of charged particles trapped in space by the Earth's magnetic field. This belt of charged particles is now known as the Van Allen radiation belt. The discovery was considered to be one of the outstanding discoveries of the International Geophysical Year.

The acoustic micrometeorite detector detected 145 impacts of cosmic dust in 78,750 seconds. This calculates to an average impact rate of 8.0^{−3} impacts per second per square meter, or 29 impacts per hour per square meter, over the twelve-day period.

== Legacy ==
Explorer 1 was the first of the long-running Explorers program. Four follow-up satellites of the Explorer series were launched by the Juno I launch vehicle in 1958. Of these, Explorer 3 and 4 were successful, while Explorer 2 and 5 failed to reach orbit. The final flight of the Juno I booster, the satellite Beacon-1, also failed. The Juno I vehicle was replaced by the Juno II launch vehicle in 1959.

A follow-up to the first mission, Explorer-1 Prime Unit 2, was successfully launched aboard a Delta II launch vehicle in late October 2011. The Prime was built using modern satellite construction techniques. The orbiting satellite was a backup, because the initial Explorer-1 Prime, launched on 4 March 2011, did not reach orbit due to a launch vehicle failure.

An identically constructed flight backup of Explorer 1 is on display in the Smithsonian Institution's National Air and Space Museum, Milestones of Flight Gallery in Washington, D.C., LC-26A was deactivated in 1963 and was designated for use as a museum in 1964, the Air Force Space and Missile Museum. Here too, a full-scale Explorer 1 is on display, but this one is a mock-up.

== Gallery ==
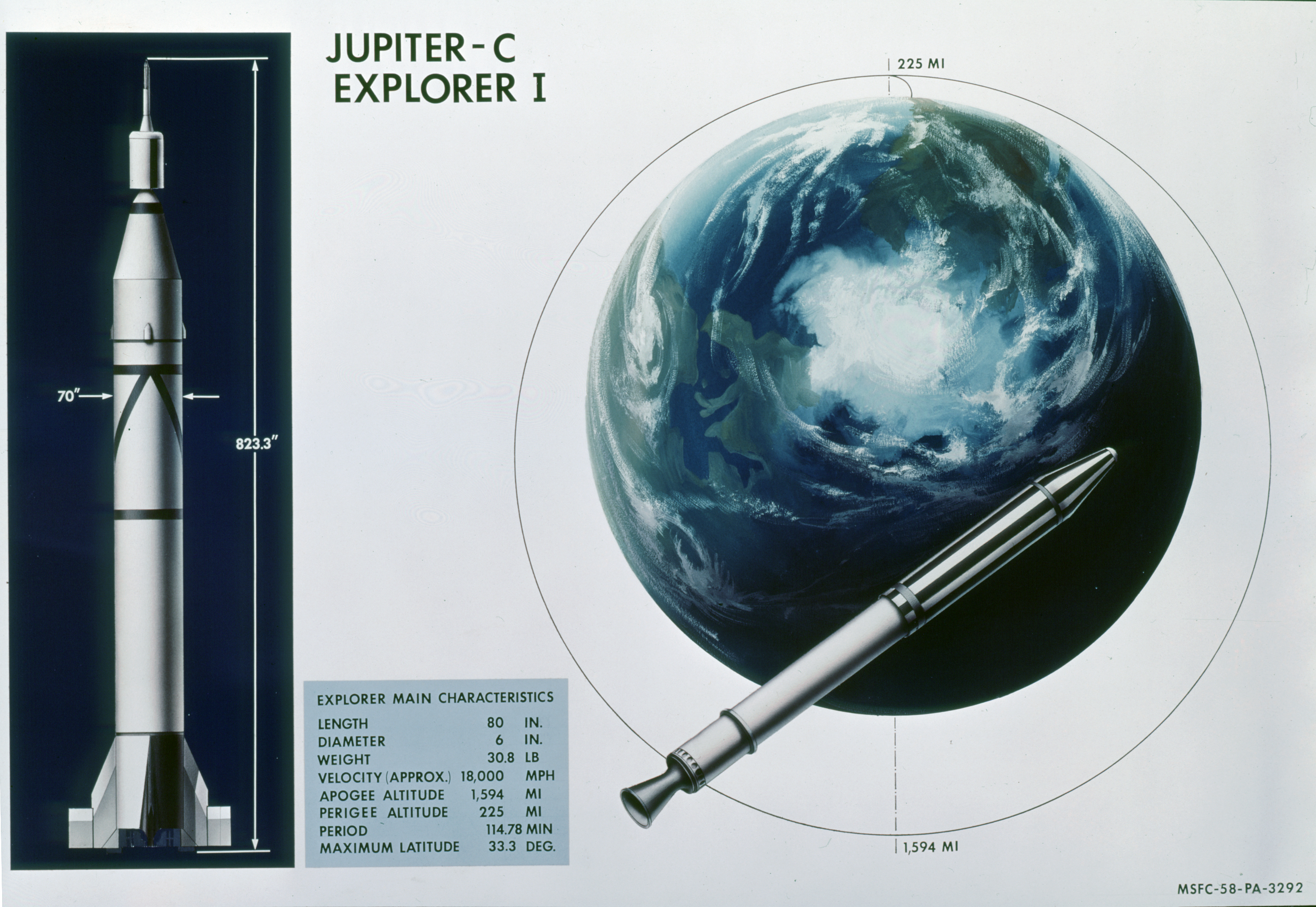
Explorer 1 statistics and orbital diagram

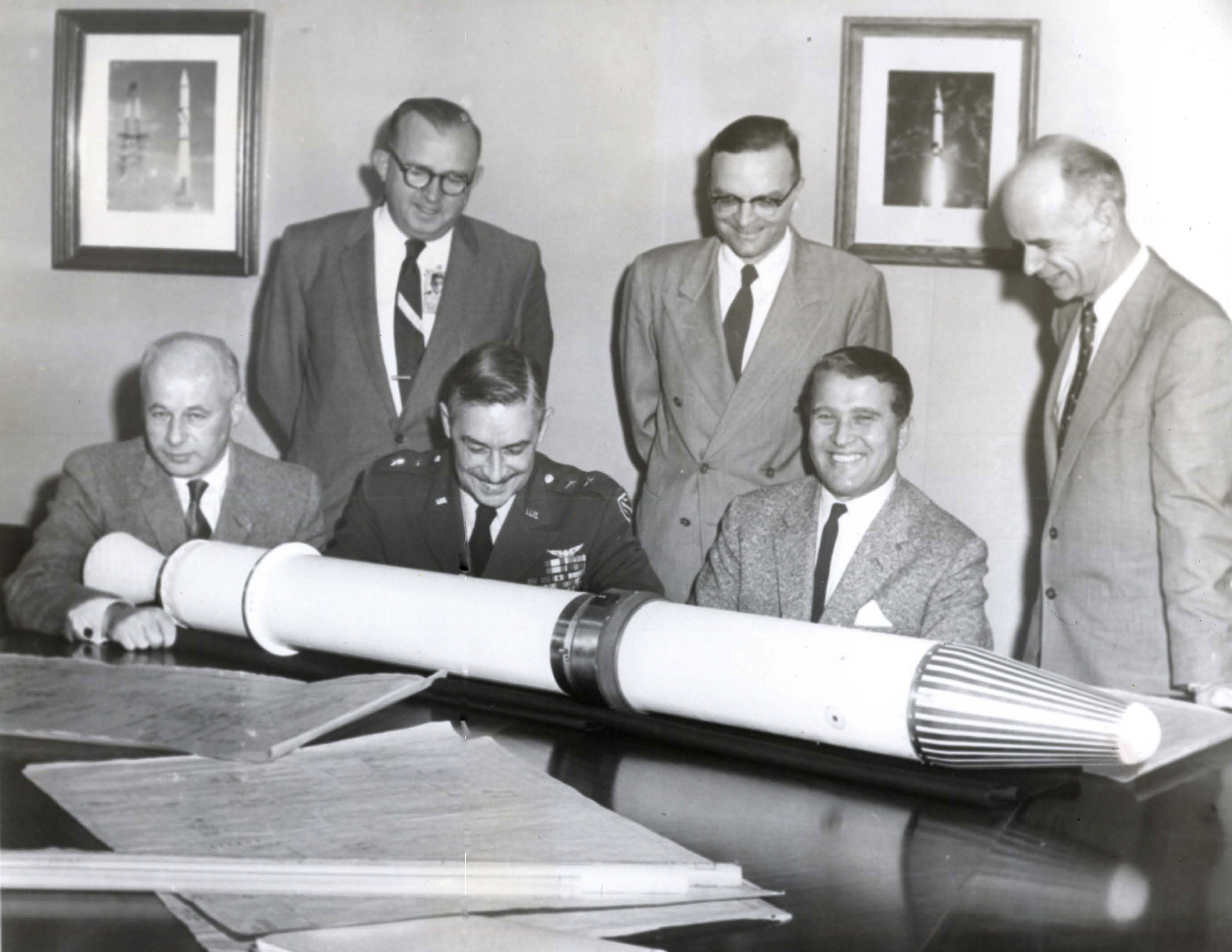
Officials with Explorer 1 model at Redstone Arsenal, including Maj. Gen. John Medaris (3rd from left), Walter Haeussermann, Wernher von Braun and Ernst Stuhlinger

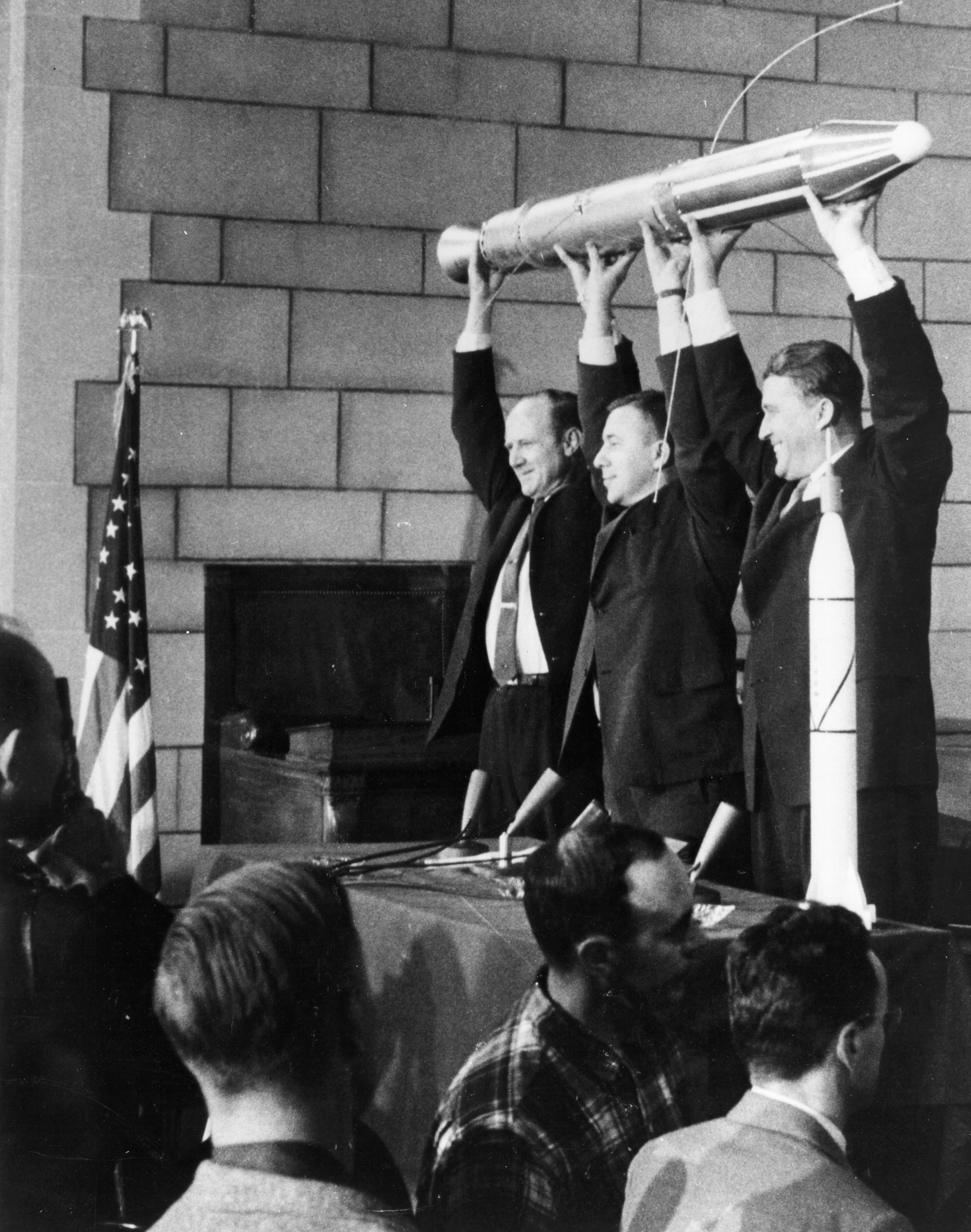
William Hayward Pickering, James Van Allen, and Wernher von Braun display a full-scale model of Explorer 1 at a crowded news conference in Washington, D.C. after confirmation the satellite was in orbit.

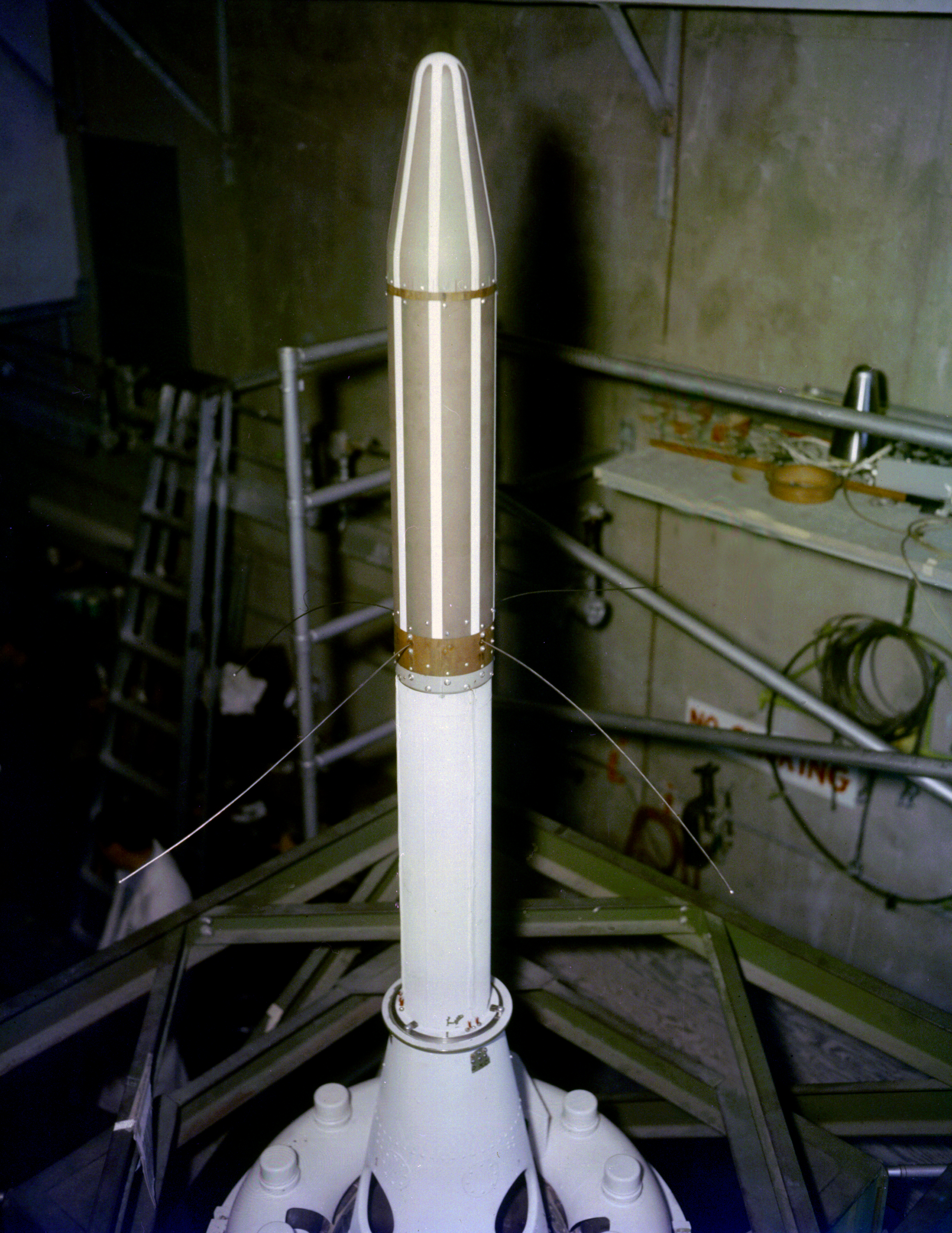
Explorer 1 in spin test facility

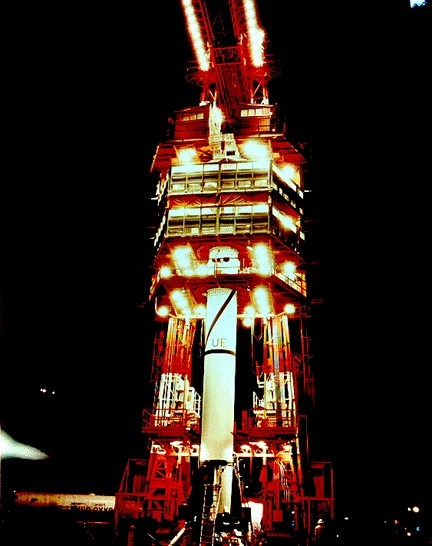
Explorer 1 and Juno I booster in gantry at LC-26A

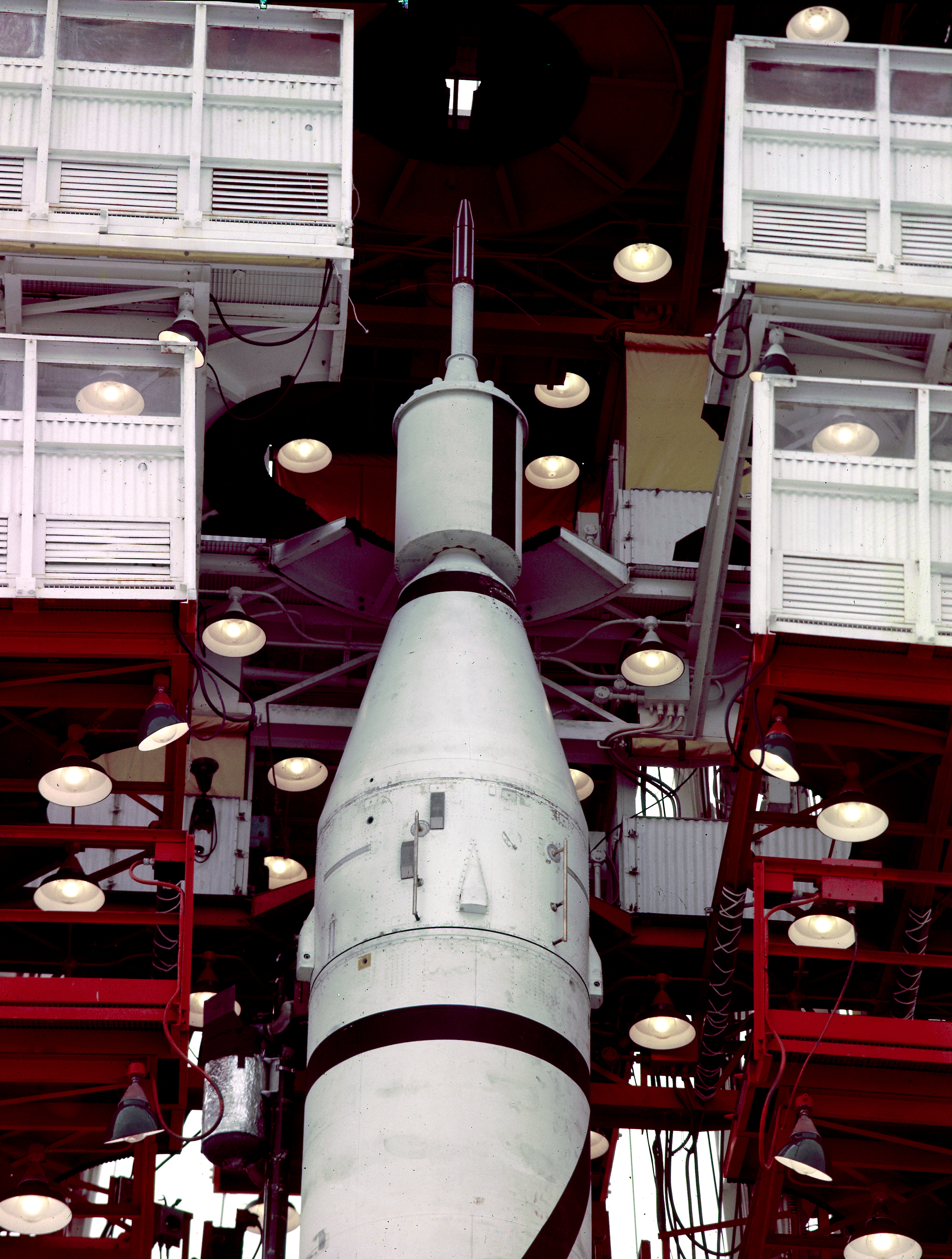
Close-up of Explorer 1 atop Juno I booster

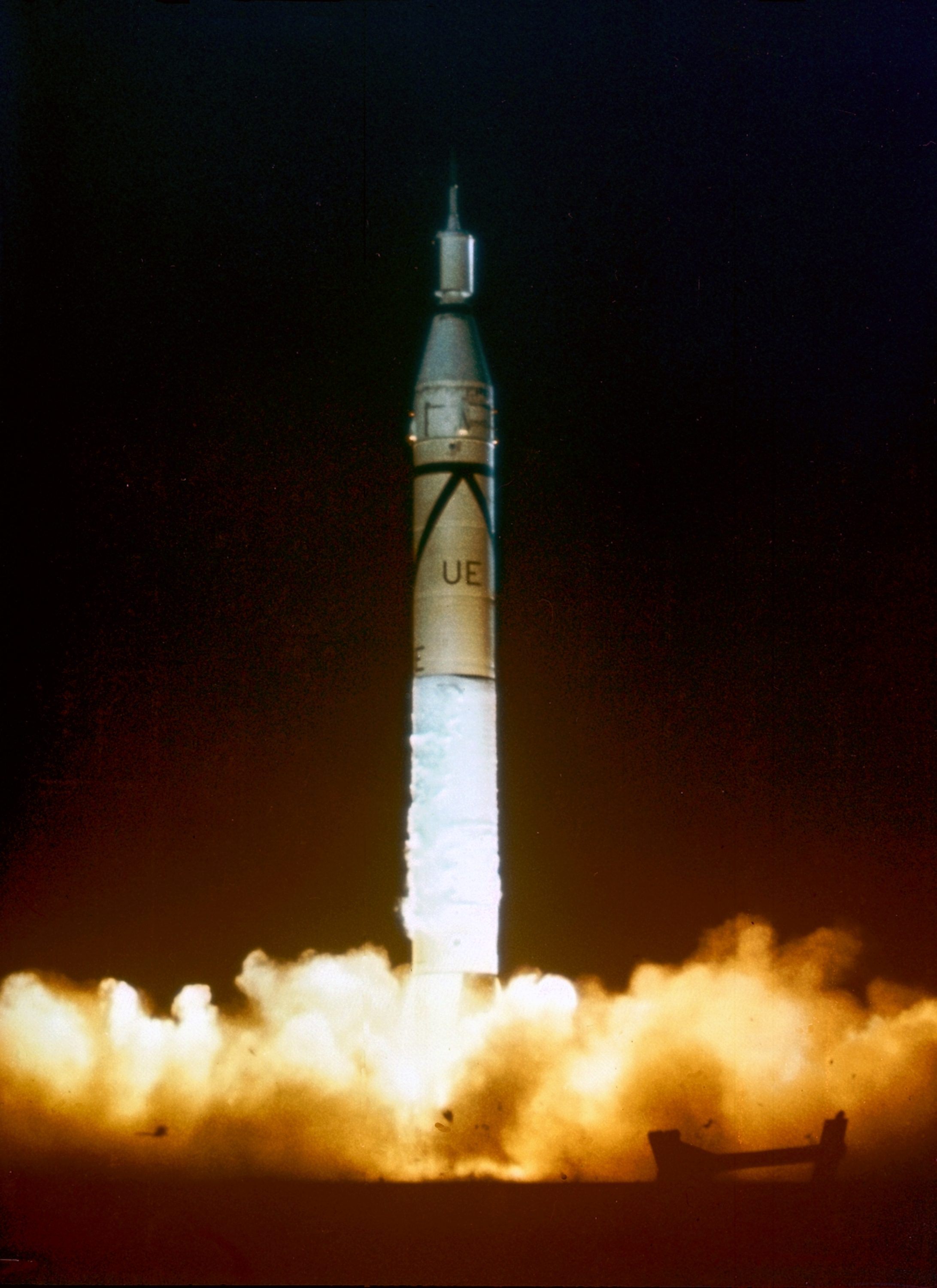
Launch of Explorer 1 on 1 February 1958

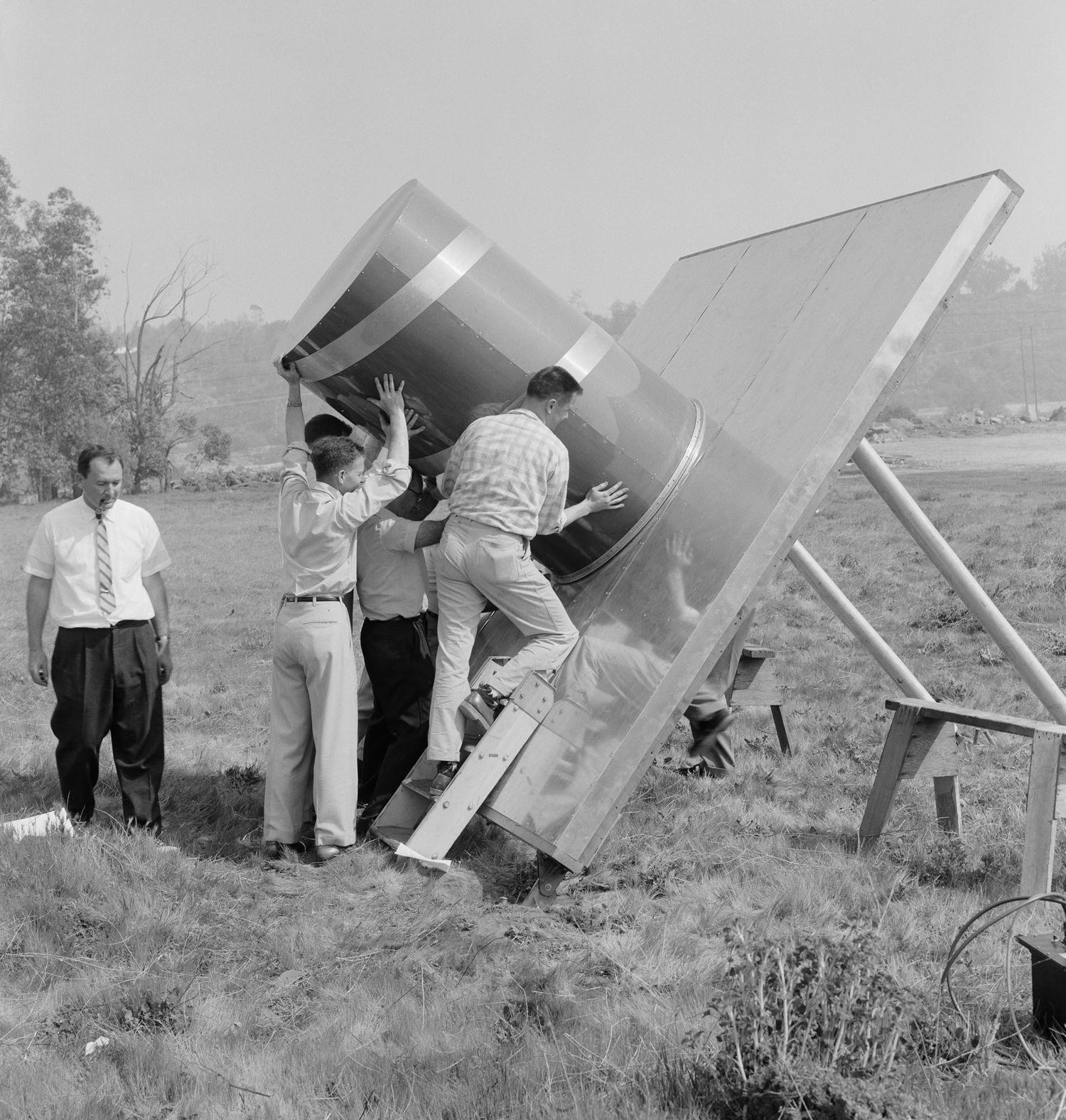
Preliminary satellite tracking tests in a field near Jet Propulsion Laboratory

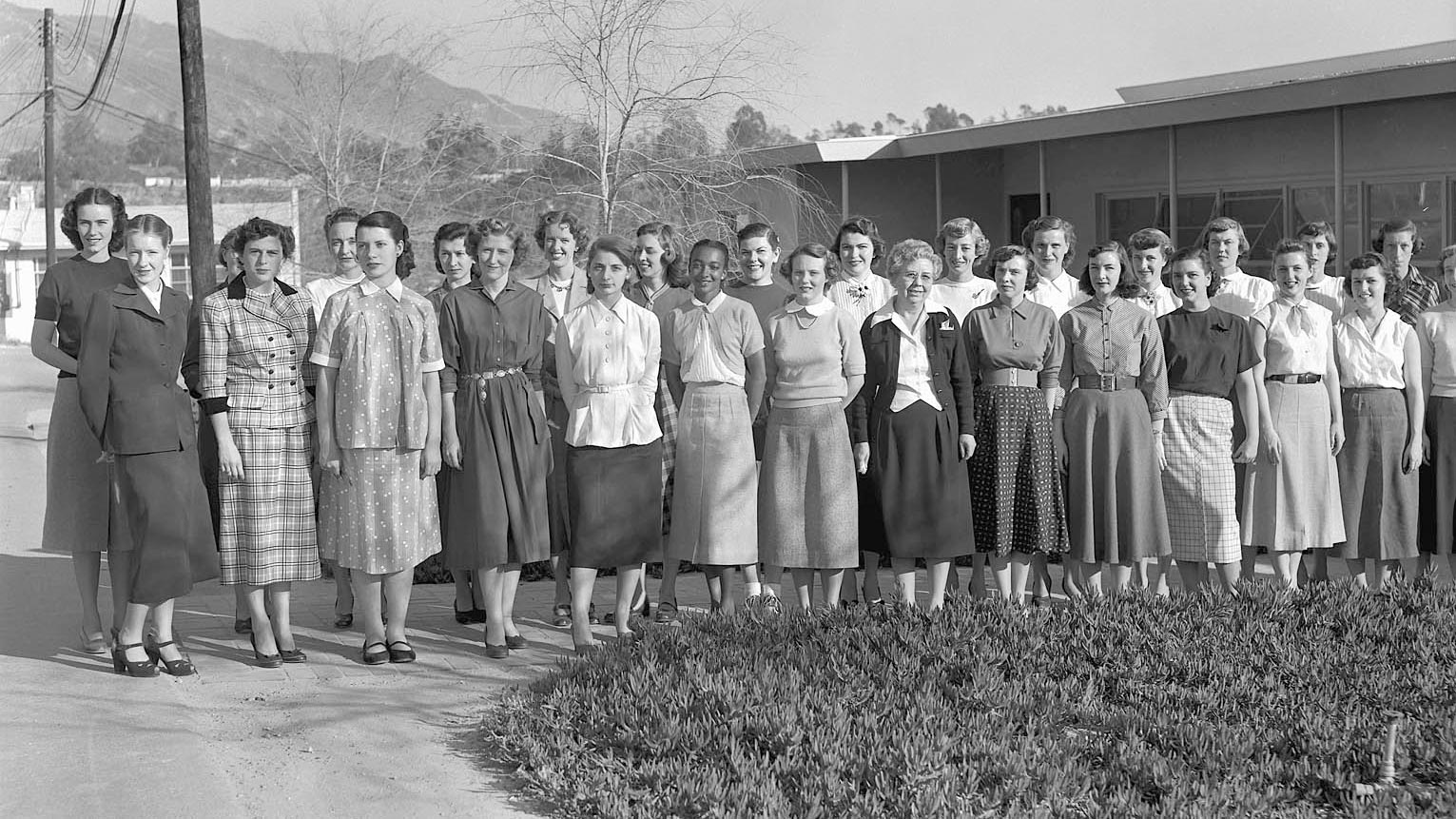
Trajectory calculations were done by hand by this group of women.

== See also ==
- Timeline of artificial satellites and space probes
- Explorer program
