= Explorer 5 =

United States satellite launched in 1958

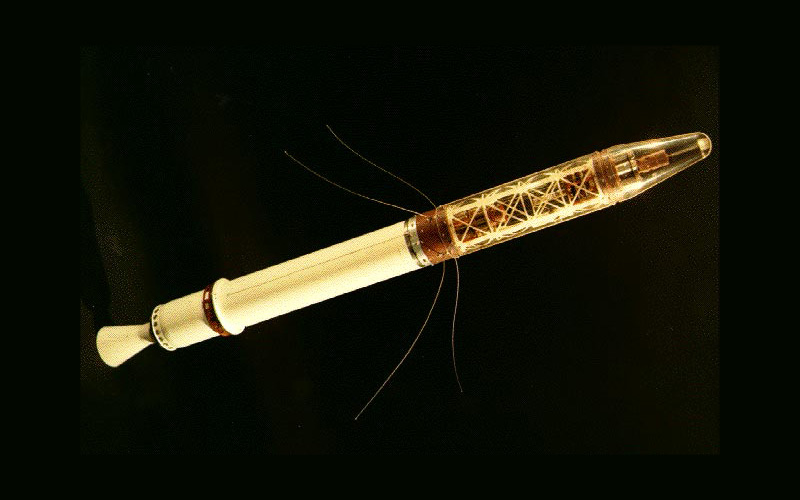
- Explorer 5 before launch
- Names: Explorer V
- Mission type: Earth science
- Operator: JPL / Army Ballistic Missile Agency
- COSPAR ID: EXPLR5
- Mission duration: Failed to orbit

Spacecraft properties
- Spacecraft: Explorer V
- Spacecraft type: Science Explorer
- Bus: Explorer 1
- Manufacturer: Jet Propulsion Laboratory
- Launch mass: 17.43 kg (38.4 lb)
- Dimensions: Cylinder: 94.6 cm (37.2 in) long, 16.5 cm (6.5 in) in diameter, total length with attached rocket motor: 2.05 m (6 ft 9 in)

Start of mission
- Launch date: 24 August 1958, 06:17:22 GMT
- Rocket: Juno I (RS-47)
- Launch site: Cape Canaveral, LC-5
- Contractor: Army Ballistic Missile Agency

End of mission
- Destroyed: Failed to orbit

Orbital parameters
- Reference system: Geocentric orbit (planned)
- Regime: Medium Earth orbit

Instruments
- Charged Particle Detector

Explorer 5 was a United States satellite with a mass of 17.43 kg (38.4 lb). It was the last of the original series of Explorer satellites built, designed, and operated by the Jet Propulsion Laboratory.

== Background ==
Explorer 5 was similar in all respects to Explorer 4 and was designed with the same basic science objectives, to make the first detailed measurements of charged particles (protons and electrons) trapped in the terrestrial radiation belts and to observe the effects of the Project Argus A-bomb detonations.

== Spacecraft and subsystems ==
Explorer 5 was a 2.05 m (6 ft 9 in) long, 16.5 cm (6.5 in) diameter cylinder and nosecone that comprised the fourth stage of the Jupiter-C launch vehicle. The on-orbit mass (after fuel burnout) was 17.43 kg (38.4 lb). The spacecraft body was made of stainless AISI-410 steel, 0.058 cm (0.023 in) thick. The surface was sandblasted, no aluminum oxide striping was used as on earlier Explorer satellites.

The base of the cylinder held the Sergeant solid-fuel rocket motor. The Mallory mercury batteries for the low power transmitter were in the upper part of the nose cone. Below these was the low power (10 mW, 108.00 MHz) transmitter for the carrier and sub-carrier signals, which used the stainless steel nose cone as an antenna.

Below the nose cone was the detector deck, holding the instrumentation for the radiation experiments, the command receiver, for interrogations, high power playback transmitter (25-30 mW, 108.03 MHz) for interrogation response, cosmic ray experiment electronics, and Mallory mercury batteries for the high power transmitter. The lower spacecraft body was used as the antenna for the high power transmitter. A heat radiation shield was mounted between the payload and the rocket motor. Temperature gauges were mounted at various locations in the spacecraft.

The radiation experiment comprised four detectors, two Geiger counters and two scintillation counters. One of the Geiger-Mueller counters was unshielded and one was shielded with 1.6 g/cm^{2} lead to screen out lower energy particles and radiation. One scintillator was a Cesium (CsI) crystal with a 0.8 mg/cm^{2} nickel foil window, the other was a plastic scintillator with a 0.14 g/cm^{2} aluminum window. All radiation experiments were within the spacecraft wall, which provided a protection of 1.2 g/cm^{2} iron.

== Juno I launch vehicle ==
The launch vehicle was a Juno I, a variant of the three-stage Jupiter-C with an added fourth propulsive stage, which in this case was the Explorer 4. The first stage was an upgraded Redstone liquid-fueled rocket. The second stage comprised a cluster of eleven Sergeant solid-fuel rocket motors and the third stage held three Sergeants. The booster was equipped to spin the fourth stage in increments, leading to a final rate of 750 rpm about its long axis.

== Instrument ==
=== Charged Particle Detector ===
The purpose of this experiment was to extend the first measurements of the trapped radiation belt discovered with Explorer 1 and Explorer 3 and to provide measurements of artificially injected electrons from the three high-altitude Argus nuclear detonations. Four separate radiation detectors were used in the experiment: a shielded directional plastic scintillation counter sensitive to electrons (E>700 keV) and protons (E>10 MeV), a shielded directional caesium iodide scintillation counter sensitive to electrons (E>20 keV) and protons (E>400 keV), an omnidirectional Anton type 302 Geiger–Müller (GM) counter sensitive to electrons (E>3 MeV) and protons (E>30 MeV), and a shielded omnidirectional Anton type 302 Geiger-Müller tube sensitive to electrons (E>5 MeV) and protons (E>40 MeV). The plastic scintillation counter and the cesium iodide (CsI) scintillation counter were each viewed by a separate Photomultiplier tube. These detectors were mounted orthogonally to the longitudinal axis of the satellite with apertures facing in opposite directions. The two GM counters were located side by side along the satellite longitudinal axis.

== Mission ==
Explorer 5 launched on 24 August 1958 at 06:17:22 GMT from the Cape Canaveral Missile Test Center of the Atlantic Missile Range. The spacecraft was not oriented correctly when the second stage fired about 3 minutes after liftoff, preventing it from achieving orbit.

== Launch ==
It launched atop a Juno I launch vehicle on 24 August 1958 from Launch Complex 5. Explorer 5 had been intended to be one of two satellites used to gather data for Project Argus. The Explorer 5 failure occurred immediately after separation of the first stage Redstone booster from the second stage. Under normal operations, when either the propellant or oxygen is depleted in the Redstone, about 155 seconds after liftoff, the propellant main valves to the combustion chamber are shut off. Five seconds after this a timer activates six explosive bolts holding the booster to the rest of the launch vehicle. These release the Redstone from the second stage, and coil springs push them apart in preparation for the subsequent second stage firing. In this case for some reason, the Redstone continued to exert thrust after separation, causing it to catch up to the back of the second stage and collide with it approximately 12 seconds after separation. This changed the orientation of the launch vehicle, resulting in the second stage firing in the wrong direction, so that an orbital trajectory was not achieved and the spacecraft reentered the atmosphere and fell back to Earth.

== See also ==
- Explorer program
- Operation Argus
