= South Atlantic Anomaly =

Region where Earth's magnetic field is weakest relative to an idealised dipole

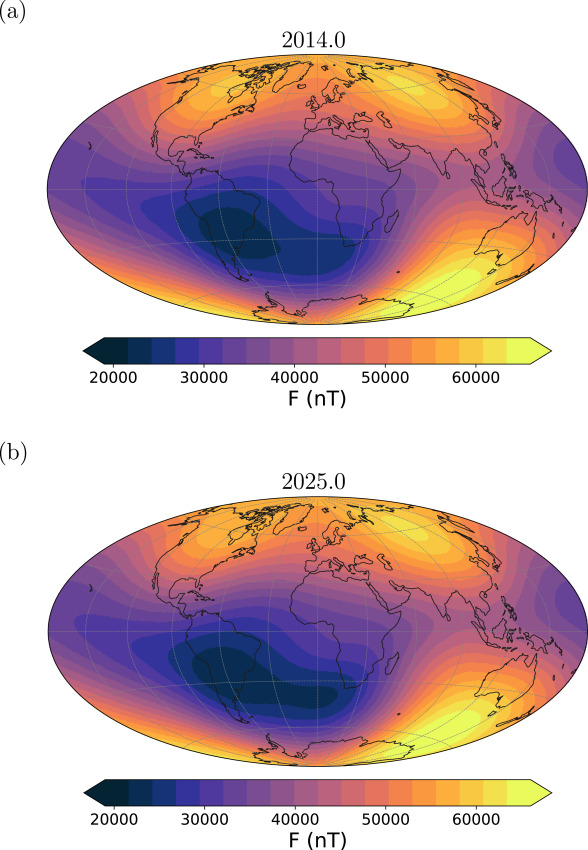
Magnetic field intensity at Earth's surface in 2014 (top) and 2025 (bottom), as measured by ESA's SWARM spacecraft. The SAA has strengthened and expanded since 2014.

The South Atlantic Anomaly (SAA) is an area where Earth's inner Van Allen radiation belt comes closest to Earth's surface, dipping down to an altitude of 200 kilometres (120 mi). This leads to an increased flux of energetic particles in this region and exposes orbiting satellites (including the ISS) to higher-than-usual levels of ionizing radiation.

The effect is caused by the non-concentricity of Earth with its magnetic dipole. The SAA is the near-Earth region where Earth's magnetic field is weakest relative to an idealized Earth-centered dipole field.

== Definition ==
The area of the SAA is confined by the intensity of Earth's magnetic field at less than 32,000 nanotesla at sea level, which corresponds to the dipolar magnetic field at ionospheric altitudes. However, the field itself varies in intensity as a gradient.

== Position and shape ==
A cross-sectional view of the Van Allen radiation belts, noting the point where the South Atlantic Anomaly occurs

The Van Allen radiation belts are symmetric about the Earth's magnetic axis, which is tilted with respect to the Earth's rotational axis by an angle of approximately 11°. The intersection between the magnetic and rotation axes of the Earth is located not at the Earth's center, but some 450 to 500 km (280 to 310 mi) away. Because of this asymmetry, the inner Van Allen belt is closest to the Earth's surface over the South Atlantic Ocean where it dips down to 200 km (120 mi) in altitude, and farthest from the Earth's surface over the north Pacific Ocean.

Intensity of the magnetic field in the center of the South Atlantic Anomaly, 1840 to 2020.

Area of the South Atlantic Anomaly, 1840 to 2020.

If Earth's magnetism is represented by a bar magnet of small size but strong intensity ("magnetic dipole"), the SAA variation can be illustrated by placing the magnet not in the plane of the Equator, but some small distance North, shifted more or less in the direction of Singapore. As a result, over northern South America and the south Atlantic, near Singapore's antipodal point, the magnetic field is relatively weak, resulting in a lower repulsion to trapped particles of the radiation belts there, and as a result these particles reach deeper into the upper atmosphere than they otherwise would.

The shape of the SAA changes over time. Since its initial discovery in 1958, the southern limits of the SAA have remained roughly constant while a long-term expansion has been measured to the northwest, the north, the northeast, and the east. Additionally, the shape and particle density of the SAA vary diurnally, with greatest particle density corresponding roughly to local noon. At an altitude of approximately 500 km (310 mi), the SAA spans from −50° to 0° geographic latitude and from −90° to +40° longitude. The highest intensity portion of the SAA drifts to the west at a speed of about 0.3° per year, and is noticeable in the references listed below. The drift rate of the SAA is very close to the rotation differential between the Earth's core and its surface, estimated to be between 0.2° and 0.5° per year.

Current literature suggests that a slow weakening of the geomagnetic field is one of several causes for the changes in the borders of the SAA since its discovery. As the geomagnetic field continues to weaken, the inner Van Allen belt gets closer to the Earth, with a commensurate enlargement of the SAA at given altitudes. During the Middle Holocene, the Earth's magnetic field in the region occupied by the SAA was relatively calm and quiescent, contrasting with its present day activity.

The South Atlantic Anomaly seems to be caused by a huge reservoir of very dense rock inside the Earth called the African large low-shear velocity province.

The position of the anomaly can be that of the maximum magnetic flux or that of the centroid of the flux, which is less sensitive to sampling noise and more representative of the feature as a whole. In January 2021, the centroid was located near 26.61°S 49.06°W and drifting about 0.23°S 0.34°W per year.

== Intensity and effects ==
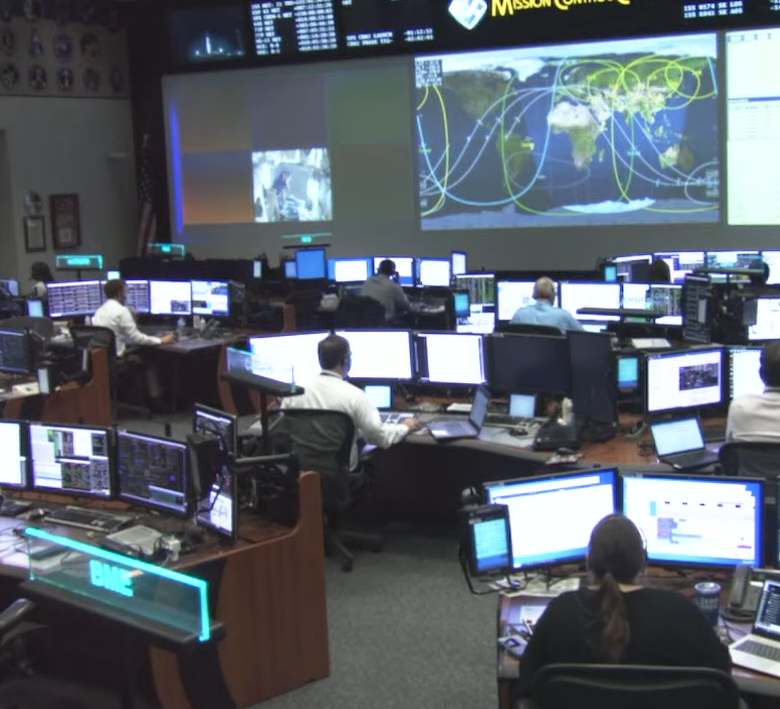
The location of the SAA is visible on the main screen at NASA's Mission Control Center in Houston.

The South Atlantic Anomaly is of great significance to astronomical satellites and other spacecraft that orbit the Earth at several hundred kilometers altitude; these orbits take satellites through the anomaly periodically, exposing them to several minutes of strong ionizing radiation, caused by the trapped protons in the inner Van Allen belt.

Measurements on Space Shuttle flight STS-94 have ascertained that absorbed dose rates from charged particles have extended from 112 to 175 μGy/day, with dose equivalent rates ranging from 264.3 to 413 μSv/day.

The International Space Station, orbiting with an inclination of 51.6°, requires extra shielding to deal with this problem. The Hubble Space Telescope does not take observations with its sensitive UV detectors while passing through the SAA. Passing through the anomaly caused false alarms on Skylab Apollo Telescope Mount's solar flare sensor. Astronauts are also affected by this region, which is said to be the cause of peculiar "shooting stars" (phosphenes) seen in the visual field of astronauts, an effect termed cosmic ray visual phenomena. Passing through the South Atlantic Anomaly is thought to be the reason for the failures of the Globalstar network's satellites in 2007.

The PAMELA experiment, while passing through the SAA, detected antiproton levels that were orders of magnitude higher than expected. This suggests the Van Allen belt confines antiparticles produced by the interaction of the Earth's upper atmosphere with cosmic rays.

NASA has reported that modern laptop computers have crashed when Space Shuttle flights passed through the anomaly.

In October 2012, the SpaceX CRS-1 Dragon spacecraft attached to the International Space Station experienced a transient problem as it passed through the anomaly.

The SAA is believed to have started a series of events leading to the destruction of the Hitomi, Japan's most powerful X-ray observatory. The anomaly transiently disabled a direction-finding mechanism, causing the satellite to rely solely on gyroscopes that were not working properly, after which it spun out of control, losing its solar panels in the process.

== See also ==
- Geomagnetic reversal
- Geomagnetic storm
- Large low-shear-velocity provinces
- Operation Argus
- Space weather
