= Explorer 4 =

Satellite launched by the United States (1958)

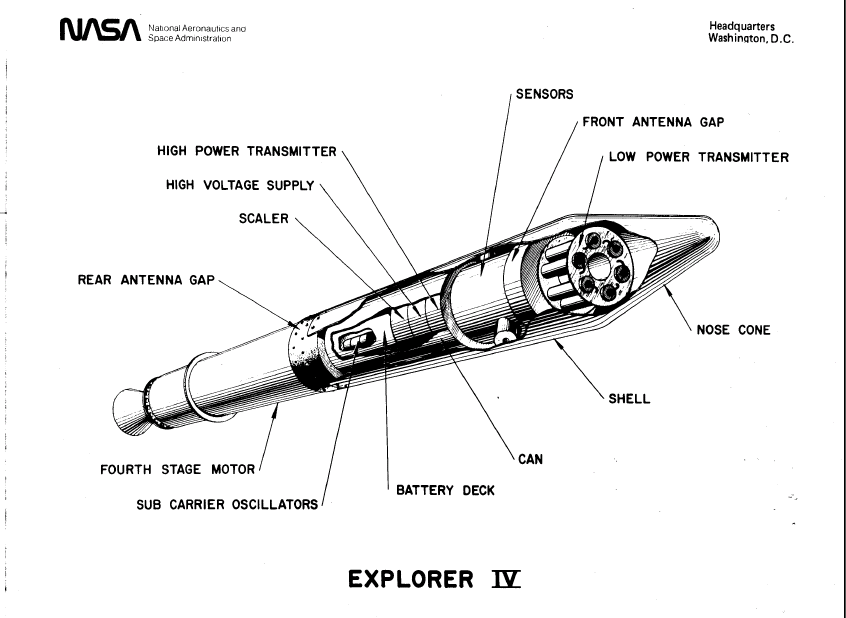
- Explorer 4 instruments
- Names: Explorer IV; 1958 Epsilon 1
- Mission type: Earth science
- Operator: JPL / Army Ballistic Missile Agency
- Harvard designation: 1958 Epsilon 1
- COSPAR ID: 1958-005A
- SATCAT no.: 00009
- Mission duration: 71 days (achieved)

Spacecraft properties
- Spacecraft: Explorer IV
- Spacecraft type: Science Explorer
- Bus: Explorer 1
- Manufacturer: Jet Propulsion Laboratory
- Launch mass: 25.50 kg (56.2 lb)
- Dimensions: Cylinder: 94.6 cm (37.2 in) long, 16.5 cm (6.5 in) in diameter, Total length with attached rocket motor: 2.05 m (6 ft 9 in)

Start of mission
- Launch date: 26 July 1958, 15:00:57 GMT
- Rocket: Juno I (RS-24)
- Launch site: Cape Canaveral, LC-5
- Contractor: Army Ballistic Missile Agency
- Entered service: 26 July 1958

End of mission
- Last contact: 5 October 1958
- Decay date: 23 October 1959

Orbital parameters
- Reference system: Geocentric orbit
- Regime: Medium Earth orbit
- Perigee altitude: 263 km (163 mi)
- Apogee altitude: 2,213 km (1,375 mi)
- Inclination: 50.30°
- Period: 110.20 minutes

Instruments
- Charged Particle Detector

Explorer 4 was an American satellite launched on 26 July 1958. It was instrumented by Dr. James van Allen's group. The Department of Defense's Advanced Research Projects Agency (ARPA) had initially planned two satellites for the purposes of studying the Van Allen radiation belts and the effects of nuclear explosions upon these belts (and the Earth's magnetosphere in general), however Explorer 4 was the only such satellite launched as the other, Explorer 5, suffered launch failure.

Explorer 4 was a cylindrically shaped satellite instrumented to make the first detailed measurements of charged particles (protons and electrons) trapped in the terrestrial radiation belts.

== Juno I launch vehicle ==
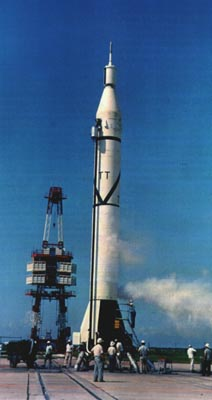
Juno I and Explorer 4 satellite

The launch vehicle was a Juno I, a variant of the three-stage Jupiter-C with an added fourth propulsive stage, which in this case was the Explorer 4. The first stage was an upgraded Redstone liquid-fueled rocket. The second stage comprised a cluster of eleven Sergeant solid-fuel rocket motors and the third stage held three Sergeants. The booster was equipped to spin the fourth stage in increments, leading to a final rate of 750 rpm about its long axis.

== Instrument ==
=== Charged Particle Detector ===
The purpose of this experiment was to extend the first measurements of the trapped radiation belt discovered with Explorer 1 and Explorer 3 and to provide measurements of artificially injected electrons from the three high-altitude Argus nuclear detonations. Four separate radiation detectors were used in the experiment: a shielded directional plastic scintillation counter sensitive to electrons (E>700 keV) and protons (E>10 MeV), a shielded directional caesium iodide scintillation counter sensitive to electrons (E>20 keV) and protons (E>400 keV), an omnidirectional Anton type 302 Geiger–Müller (GM) counter sensitive to electrons (E>3 MeV) and protons (E>30 MeV), and a shielded omnidirectional Anton type 302 Geiger-Müller tube sensitive to electrons (E>5 MeV) and protons (E>40 MeV). The plastic scintillation counter and the caesium iodide (CsI) scintillation counter were each viewed by a separate Photomultiplier tube. These detectors were mounted orthogonally to the longitudinal axis of the satellite with apertures facing in opposite directions. The two GM counters were located side by side along the satellite longitudinal axis.

== Mission ==
Explorer 4 was launched on 26 July 1958 at 15:00:07 GMT from the Cape Canaveral Missile Test Center of the Atlantic Missile Range. The spacecraft was injected into an initial 263 × 2,213 km (163 × 1,375 mi) orbit with an inclination of 50.30° and a period of 110.20 minutes at 15:07 GMT. This was a much higher inclination and apogee than previous Explorer to allow it to sample more area at higher altitudes. Soon after orbit insertion, the spacecraft developed an end-over-end tumbling motion with a period of about 6 seconds, which affected the measurements and signal level throughout the mission.

The mission remained secret from the public for six months. The satellite telemetry was analyzed for three Operation Argus nuclear weapons tests at high altitude. Explorer 4 was in orbit and operational during the three Project Argus launches 27 August 1958 to 6 September 1958, part of the mission objective was to observe the effects of these high-altitude A-bomb detonations on the space environment.

An unexpected tumble motion of the satellite made the interpretation of the detector data very difficult. The low-power transmitter and the plastic scintillator detector failed on 3 September 1958. The two Geiger-Müller tubes and the caesium iodide crystal detectors continued to operate normally until 19 September 1958. The high-power transmitter ceased sending signals on 5 October 1958. It is believed that exhaustion of the power batteries caused these failures. The spacecraft decayed from orbit after 454 days on 23 October 1959.

== See also ==
- Explorer program
- Operation Argus
