= Ramo (disambiguation) =

A ramo was a warrior-leader among certain tribes on Malaita in the Solomon Islands.

Ramo may also refer to:

== People ==
- Rämö (surname), Finnish surname
- Ramo (name), list of people with the name

== Other uses ==
- Productos Ramo, Colombian company
- Ramo, a modification of the ASM-N-6 Omar air-to-surface missile
- Ramo (TV series), a Turkish drama-series

== See also ==
- Ramo language (disambiguation)
- Ramos (disambiguation)
