= Mark 46 =

The designation Mark 46 can refer to:

- Mark 46 machine gun, lighter weight version of the M249 machine gun
- Mark 46 nuclear bomb, also B46
- Mark 46 torpedo
- Mark 46 30 mm chain gun
