= Diego Ramos (disambiguation) =

Diego Ramos (English: James Branch) may refer to:

== Persons ==
- Diego César Ramos (born 1972) Argentine actor
- Diego Fernández de Cevallos Ramos (born 1941) Mexican politician
- Diego Ramos (archer), an Ecuadorian archer, see Ecuador at the 2011 Pan American Games
- Diego Ramos (driver), a Brazilian race car driver, see 2017 Formula 3 Brasil season and 2018 Stock Car Light season and 2019 Stock Car Light season
- Diego Ramos (runner), a Chilean sprinter, see 2007 South American Junior Championships in Athletics
- Diego Ramos de Orozco (16th century) Spanish conquistador in Puerto Rico, for whom Sierra de Orozco in the Cordillera Central is named, and builder of the Castillo San Felipe del Morro

== Fictional characters ==
- Diego Ramos (Dark Fate), a Terminator franchise character from Terminator: Dark Fate
- Diego "Wolf" Ramos (Descendants of the Sun), a character from the Filipino adaptation of the Korean TV show, see Descendants of the Sun (Philippine TV series)

== See also ==
- Diego (disambiguation)
- Ramos (disambiguation)
