= W46 =

W46 may refer to:

- Fūren Station, in Hokkaido, Japan
- Needlestick injury
- XW-46, a nuclear warhead design
