= High Velocity Aircraft Rocket =

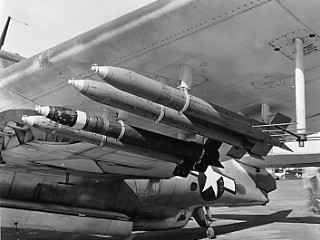
- Type: Air-to-surface rocket
- Place of origin: United States

Service history
- Used by: United States military

Production history
- Produced: 1944-1955

Specifications
- Mass: 134 pounds (61 kg)
- Length: 68 inches (173 cm)
- Diameter: 5 inches (127 mm)
- Wingspan: 15.625 inches (39.7 cm)
- Warhead: 7.5 pounds (3.4 kg) of TNT or Composition B
- Warhead weight: 45.5 pounds (20.6 kg)
- Engine: 52 inches (132 cm) long x 5 inches (12.7 cm) diameter solid propellant rocket motor
- Propellant: Ballistite, extruded
- Maximum speed: 1,375 feet per second (419 m/s) plus speed of launching aircraft
- Guidance system: None
- Launch platform: Ground attack or multirole aircraft

The High Velocity Aircraft Rocket, or HVAR, also known by the nickname Holy Moses, was an American unguided rocket developed during World War II to attack targets on the ground from aircraft. It saw extensive use during both World War II and the Korean War.

== Design and development ==
The HVAR was designed by engineers at Caltech during World War II as an improvement on the 5-Inch Forward Firing Aircraft Rocket (FFAR), which had a 5-inch (127 mm) diameter warhead but an underpowered 3.25-inch (83 mm) diameter rocket motor. The desire for improved accuracy from the flatter trajectory of a faster rocket spurred the rapid development. HVAR had a constant 5-inch diameter for both warhead and rocket motor, increasing propellant from 8.5 to 23.9 pounds (3.9 to 10.8 kg) of Ballistite. U.S. Ballistite propellant had a sea level specific impulse of over 200 seconds (2.0 km/s), compared with about 180 seconds (1.8 km/s) for the British Cordite, German WASAG and Soviet PTP propellants. Hercules Powder Company was the principal U.S. supplier of high performance extruded Ballistite propellants: 51.5% nitrocellulose, 43% nitroglycerine, 3.25% diethyl phthalate, 1.25% potassium sulfate, 1% ethyl centralite, and 0.2% carbon black.

The propellant in U.S. 3.25-inch and 5-inch rocket motors consisted of a single large X-shaped cross-section, "cruciform" Ballistite grain cavity. This went against the common practice of filling rocket motors with different numbers of smaller same-sized tubular charges with a round cavity, the number depending on motor diameter. The central hole in a tubular charge makes it more difficult to extrude, requiring a softer propellant blend that also yields somewhat lower performance. Rocket ∆V increased from 216 m/s (710 ft/s) for the 5-inch AR to 420 m/s (1,400 ft/s) for HVAR, giving the coveted flatter trajectory.

== Operational service ==
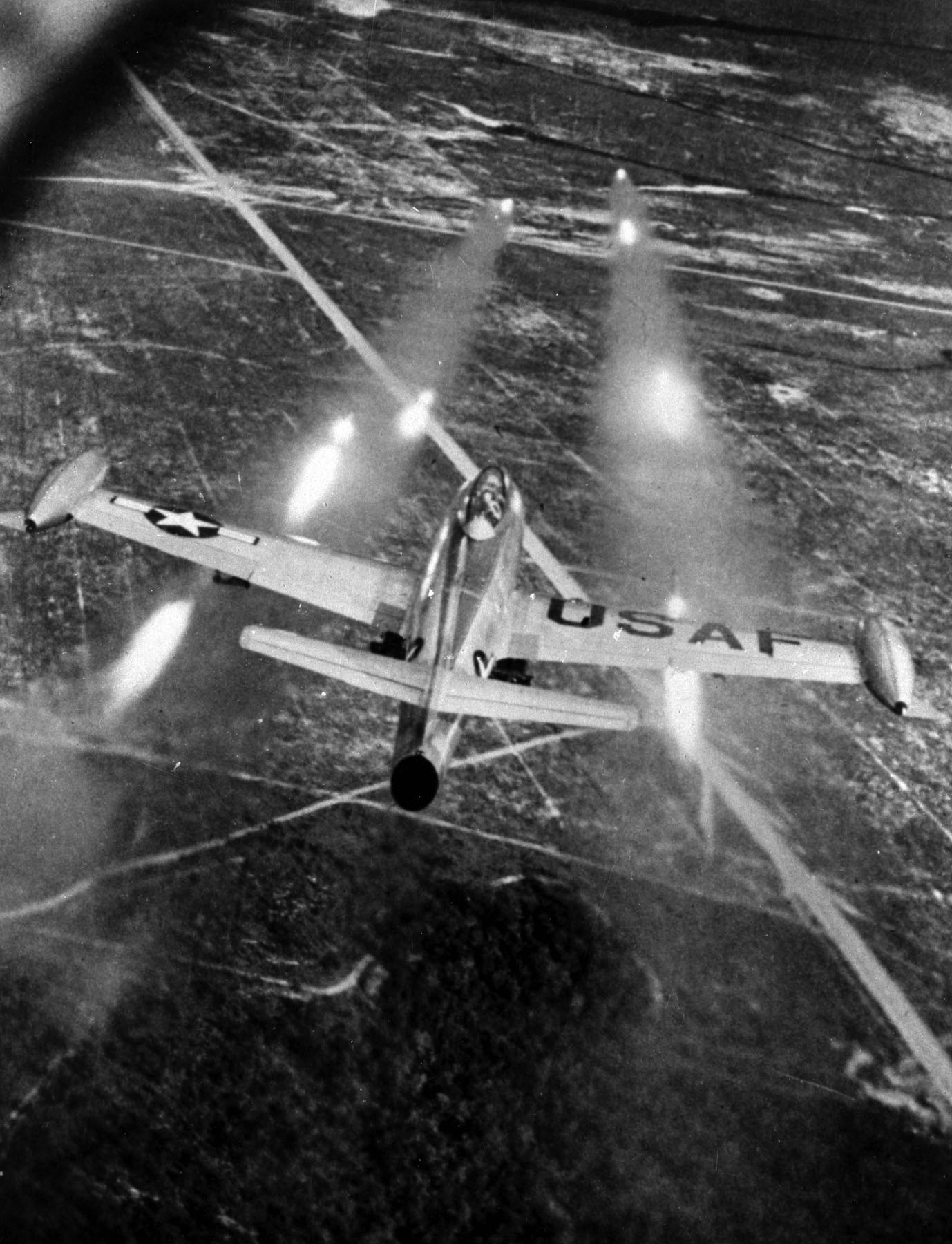
An F-84E launching rockets

Two different versions of the HVAR were built during World War II. The warheads were Mk 4 general purpose warheads holding 7.6 pounds (3.4 kg) of TNT with base and optionally nose fuses; or Mk. 2 AP warheads with 2.2 pounds (1.00 kg) of Explosive D.

HVAR testing was complete by D-Day, 6 June 1944, and air-lifted Navy HVAR rockets were soon being loaded on Ninth Air Force Republic P-47D Thunderbolts to support the break-out at Normandy. Other single-engine delivery aircraft included the Vought F4U Corsair, Grumman F6F Hellcat, Grumman TBF/TBM Avenger, and Curtiss SB2C Helldiver. Twin-engine aircraft sometimes armed with HVARs included the Lockheed P-38 Lightning, North American PBJ Mitchell bomber and the Lockheed PV-2 Harpoon bomber.

HVAR could penetrate 4 ft (1.2 m) of reinforced concrete and was used to sink transports, knock out pillboxes and AA gun emplacements, blow up ammo and oil-storage dumps, and destroy tanks, locomotives, and bunkers. Navy F4U Corsairs and TBF/TBM Avengers made the most extensive use of the rockets in the Pacific theater after the victory in Europe. Over a million HVARs were made during World War II, and production continued until 1955. HVARs remained in the Navy's inventory until the mid-1960s. After World War II, newer versions included a new general purpose type with a proximity fuse, white phosphorus smoke rounds, an anti-submarine head, and a new shaped-charge warhead for use against tanks. The 6.5-inch (170 mm) RAM rocket was an oversized shaped-charge head on a standard HVAR motor as well.

HVAR was an effective weapon in the hands of skilled, experienced pilots. It was less effective in the hands of average or inexperienced pilots who were accustomed to taking less careful aim and then "walking in" their gunfire to finally engage a target. HVARs could be fired in pairs or a single rapid-fire salvo but required accurate initial alignment and careful attention to range, or at least a good instinctive sense for the range to the target. HVARs were widely used in the Korean War. Douglas AD-1 Skyraiders often carried a dozen HVARs, and sometimes an additional pair of much larger but less accurate Tiny Tim 11.75-inch (29.8 cm) rockets. Targets included ships, bunkers, pillboxes, coastal defense guns, ammunition dumps, and occasionally even destroyers and major bridges. Numerous North American F-51D Mustang "Six-Shooters" (six .50 cal (12.7 mm) machine guns plus six HVARs and 2 bombs or ten HVARs) and carrier-based Grumman F9F Panther jets flew close air support in Korea. Panthers carried 6 HVARs and four 20mm cannons, while both planes could carry an additional pair of 500 lb (230 kg) bombs, napalm, or fuel tanks. Neil Armstrong and John Glenn were among the Panther pilots. It was in Korea that HVARs and Tiny Tims bridged the gap between prop planes and jets: Lockheed F-80C Shooting Star, Republic F-84E Thunderjet, Grumman F9F Panther, and North American F-86 Sabre. Jets gave the fighter pilots improved forward visibility. F-84E Thunderjets proved to be the most capable load-lifting fighter/bombers in Korea, demonstrating an ability to loft up to 24 HVARs and 2 Tiny Tims with a combined rocket weight of 5,800 pounds (2,600 kg).

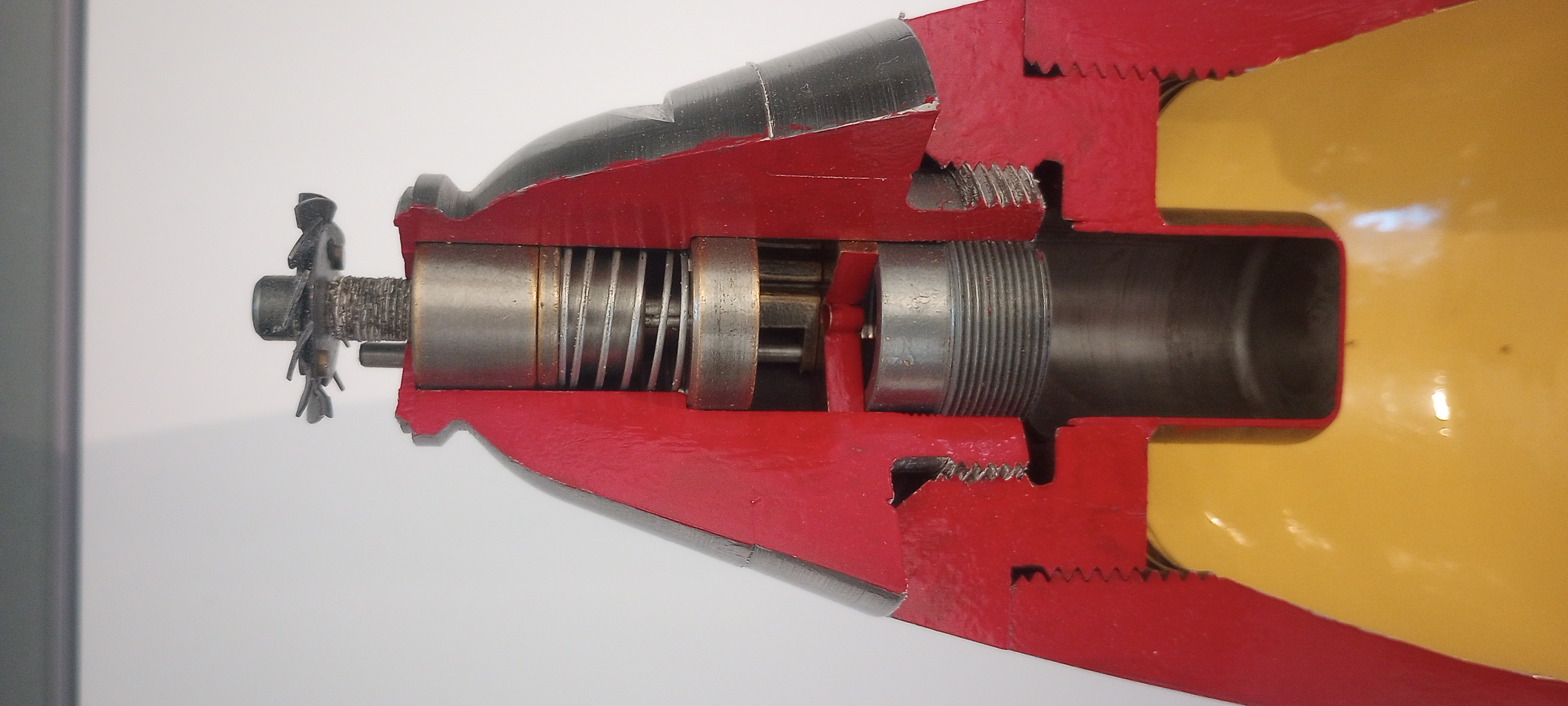
Cross section showing the detonation system, on display at the Steven F. Udvar-Hazy center

In April 1945, HVAR rockets were used in Operation Bumblebee in the Navy's facility on Island Beach, New Jersey. The HVAR rockets launched 6-inch (150 mm) ramjet engines from wooden frames, accelerating the carbon disulfide fuel ramjets to flight speed. On 13 June, the ramjets achieved supersonic speed.

HVAR rockets were used in the 1970s, the Mk.32 HEAT round being used by Air Force A-1E Skyraiders in Vietnam.

== Warheads ==
Initial WW2 HVAR warheads were modified 5"/38 caliber gun shells, with the Mk.6 head being a modification of AA Common shells and the Mk.2 being derived from Special Common rounds. Later heads were purpose-built. The Mark 6 HE head came in two variations, Mod 0 and Mod 1. Mod 1 had a deep nose cavity to fit the M403 VT fuze and thus carried 0.5lb less explosive fill.

Type	Model	Weight	Filler	Filler weight, lb
HE	Mk 6 Mod 1	45.87	TNT	7.6
HE	Mk 6 Mod 4	45.04	TNT	7.1
AP	Mk 2	48.3	Explosive D	2.2
Smoke-PWP	Mk 4	48.09	PWP (plasticised white phosphorus)	19.36
HEAT	Mk 25	47.85	Comp B	15.33
AP/ASW	Mk 29	48.56	Explosive D	3.03

== Ammunition ==
A head assembled with a motor is known by a separate designation listed below.

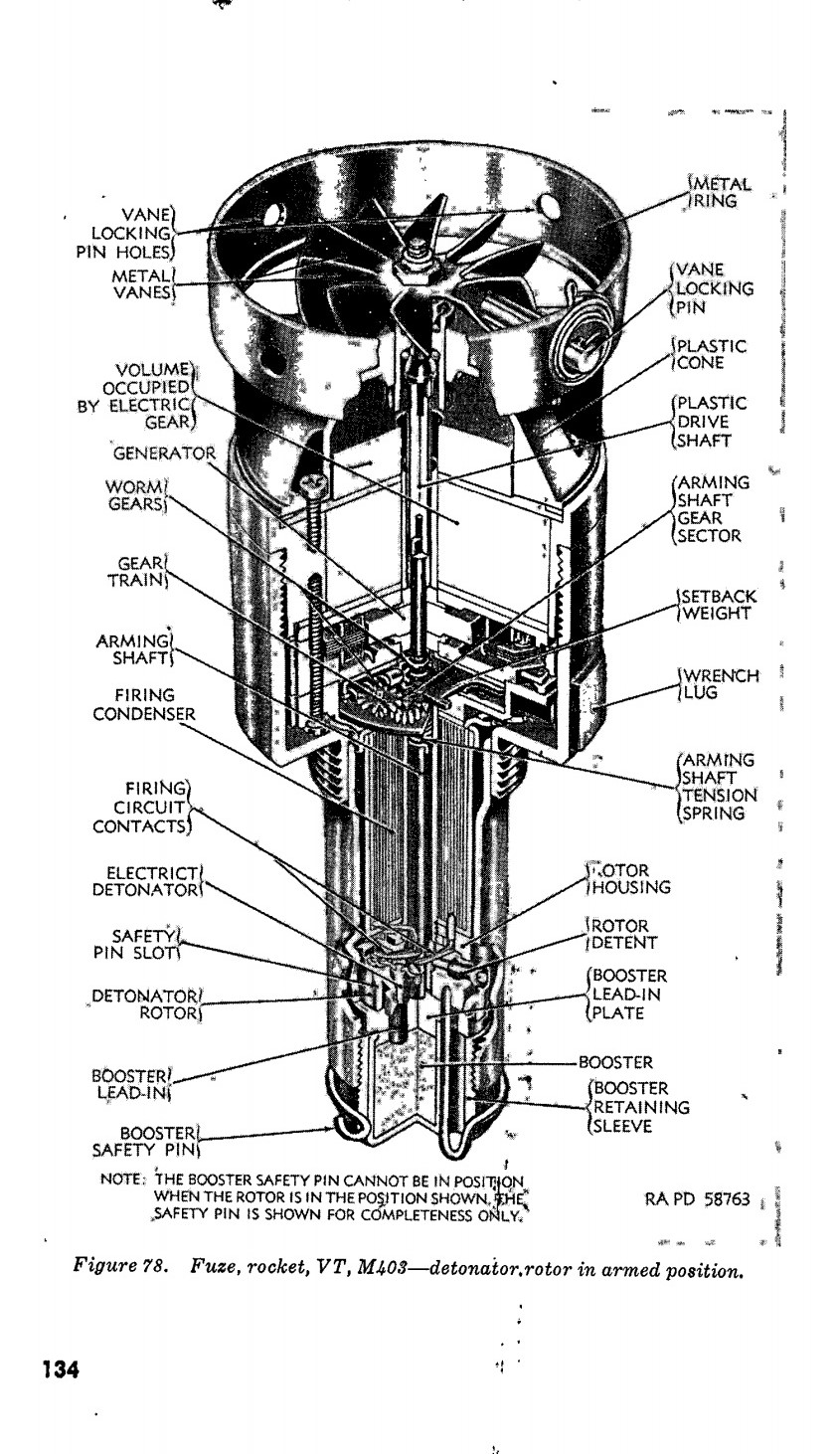
A cutaway drawing of the M403 VT fuze used on the Mk 6 Mod 4 head. For security reasons, the actual radar components are not shown, with the space being left empty and vaguely captioned "Volume occupied by electrical gear."

Head	Complete Round	Type	Weight
Mk 6 Mod 1	Mk 28 Mod 4	GP	138.49lb
Mk 6 Mod 4	Mk 28 Mod 5	VT	138.49lb
Mk 25	Mk 32	HEAT	140.47
Mk 29	Mk 34	AP/ASW	138.43lb
Mk 2	Mk 35	AP	138.47lb
Mk 4	Mk 36	Smoke-PWP	140.71lb

== Performance ==
Ammunition Type	Armor Penetration 0°,	70°
GP Mk 6 Mod 0	25mm	
AP Mk 2	51-76mm (Note: Penetration is only given as an estimate of 2-3 inches)	
HEAT Mk 25	263mm (Note: Estimated, as 90mm of armor at 70 degrees is 263mm effective per the Relative Armor Calculator)	90mm

Ammunition Type	Concrete Penetration, (Note: NAVORD OP 2210 gives these figures as inches rather than feet, this is believed erroneous as multiple other sources contradict this) 0°	30°
GP Mk 6 Mod 0	1,143mm	838mm

== Target Rocket ==
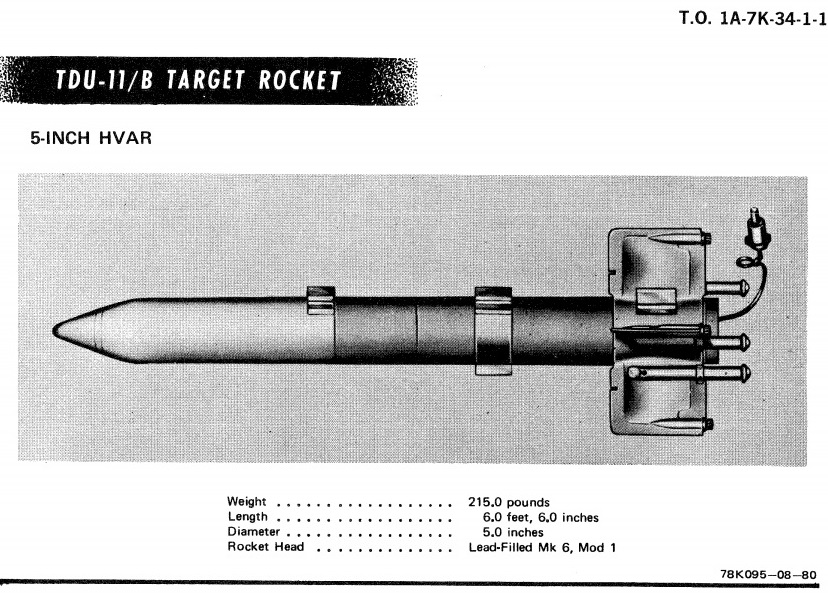
TDU-11/B target rocket

Some surviving HVAR rockets were converted to training targets for pilots to practice firing AIM-9 Sidewinder infrared-guided missiles. Known as the TDU-11/B to the US Air Force and Target Rocket Mark 26 Mod 0 to the US Navy, it was heavier than the base rocket at about 215lb. The target rocket used a Mk.6 head with inert lead ballast and was fitted with four Mark 21 (aluminum construction) or 33 (steel) tracking flares, 10 inches long by 1 inch wide and carrying 100 grams of pyrotechnic mixture, to provide a strong IR signature for the Sidewinder to lock onto. Carried paired with AIM-9s on AERO-3B launchers, a pilot would fire the rocket, then switch to his Sidewinder, wait for it to acquire the tracking flares, and fire. Target rockets were phased out by the USN in the mid-1960s in favor of towed or drone targets, while the USAF and RAAF used the device into the 1980s

== See also ==
- 3.5-Inch Forward Firing Aircraft Rocket
- BOAR (rocket)
- XASM-N-6

== Bibliography ==
- Parsch, Andreas (2006). "Air-Launched 5-Inch Rockets". Directory of U.S. Military Rockets and Missiles. designation-systems.net.
