= Ram (rocket) =

RAM
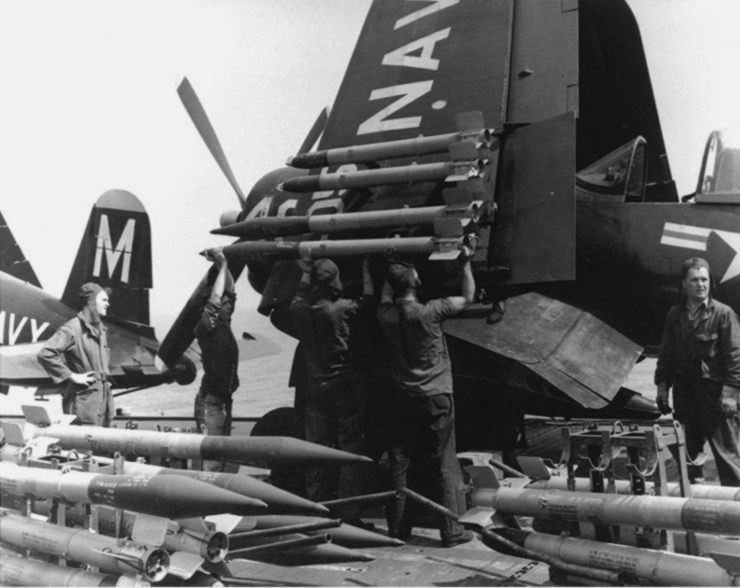
- RAM (lower) and HVAR rockets mounted on a F4U Corsair
- Type: Air-to-surface rocket
- Place of origin: United States

Service history
- In service: 1950–54
- Used by: United States Navy

Production history
- Manufacturer: Naval Ordnance Test Station
- Produced: 1944–55

Specifications
- Diameter: 6.5 inches (165 mm)
- Warhead: Composition B, shaped charge
- Warhead weight: 19.6 pounds (8.9 kg)
- Blast yield: 24 inches (610 mm) penetration
- Engine: Solid-fuel rocket
- Operational range: 3 miles (4.8 km)
- Guidance system: None

The RAM, also known as the 6.5-Inch Anti-Tank Aircraft Rocket or ATAR, was an air-to-ground rocket used by the United States Navy during the Korean War. Developed rapidly, the rocket proved successful but was phased out shortly after the end of the conflict.

== Design and development ==
In 1950, the outbreak of the Korean War resulted in the United States Navy urgently requiring an aircraft-launched rocket that would be effective against enemy tanks, as the existing High Velocity Aircraft Rocket (HVAR) high-velocity aircraft rocket was expected to be ineffective against the armor of IS-3 heavy tanks.

The development of an improved rocket was undertaken with remarkable speed; a directive to start work on the project was issued on July 6, 1950, and the first rockets were delivered to the war zone on July 29. Over the course of those 23 days, the Naval Air Weapons Station China Lake, located in China Lake, California, developed an improved version of the HVAR, with a new, 6.5 inches (165 mm) shaped-charge warhead replacing the earlier weapon's 5 inches (127 mm) charge. The fuse for the shaped charge, developed with the same haste as the rocket itself, was considered dangerous, but proved to be safe enough in service; it was described as being "[not] as dangerous as the Russian tanks" it was designed to destroy. Claimed as being superior in armor penetration to the conventional 3.5 inch bazooka's warhead, which could penetrate 11 inches (279 mm) of armor, the RAM's warhead was capable of penetrating 24 inches (610 mm) of armor plate.

== Operational history ==
Officially designated the 6.5-Inch Anti-Tank Aircraft Rocket (ATAR), and commonly known in service as "RAM", the new rocket was rushed to the Korean front, being used in combat for the first time on August 16, 1950. Despite the haste with which the weapon had been developed, the very first shipment included a full set of documentation and firing tables for the use of the rocket. The first 600 rockets were constructed by hand, but a production line was rapidly set up.

In operational service, the RAM was fitted to the F-51 Mustang, F-80 Shooting Star and F4U Corsair aircraft, and it proved to be moderately effective, with the first 150 rockets fired scoring "at least" eight confirmed kills of North Korean tanks. However, the rocket proved to be unpopular with pilots, due to the close approach to the target required for accurate firing execution; the HVAR offered a longer range, while napalm was considered more effective if the range had to be closed. With the end of the war in 1953, the ATAR was withdrawn from service, improved versions of the HVAR having become available as an alternative.

== See also ==
- FFAR
- Tiny Tim (rocket)
- BOAR (rocket)
