= Operation Hardtack I =

Series of 1950s US nuclear tests

- Hardtack I-Teak, 3.88 megatons.

Information
- Country: United States
- Test site: Bogallua (Alice), Enewetak Atoll; Eninmen (Tare), Bikini Atoll; Enjebi (Janet), Enewetak Atoll; Johnston Island, Johnston Atoll; Namu (Charlie), Bikini Atoll; Pacific Proving Grounds; Pokon (Irvin), Enewetak Atoll; Runit (Yvonne), Enewetak Atoll; Teiter (Gene), Enewetak Atoll; Yurochi aka Irioj (Dog), Bikini Atoll
- Period: 1958
- Number of tests: 35
- Test type: Air drop; Balloon; Barge; Dry surface; High-altitude rocket 30–80 km (98,000–262,000 ft); Underwater detonation
- Max. yield: 9.3 megatons of TNT (39 PJ)

Test series chronology

Operation Hardtack I was a series of 35 nuclear tests conducted by the United States from April 28 to August 18, 1958, at the Pacific Proving Grounds. At the time of testing, the Operation Hardtack I test series included more nuclear detonations than the total of prior nuclear explosions in the Pacific Ocean. These tests followed the Project 58/58A series, which occurred from December 6, 1957, to March 14, 1958, and preceded the Operation Argus series, which took place in 1958 from August 27 to September 6.

Operation Hardtack I was directed by Joint Task Force 7 (JTF 7). JTF-7 was a collaboration between the military and many civilians, but was structured like a military organization. Its 19,100 personnel were composed of members of the US military, federal civilian employees, as well as workers affiliated with the Department of Defense (DOD) and the Atomic Energy Commission (AEC).

There were three main research directions. The first was the development of new types of nuclear weapons. This was undertaken by detonating experimental devices created by the AEC's Los Alamos Scientific Laboratory and the University of California Radiation Laboratory (UCRL). The DOD performed experiments and tests on these detonations that did not hamper the AEC's research. The second research direction was to examine how underwater explosions affected materiel, especially Navy ships, and was performed by the DOD. The Wahoo test was conducted in the open ocean, whereas Umbrella was in a lagoon. The final avenue of study was to analyze high-altitude nuclear tests to refine the detection of high-altitude nuclear tests and investigate defensive practices for combatting ballistic missiles. This research direction was composed of three individual tests and were the first high-altitude tests. The individual tests in the series were Orange, Teak, and Yucca. Orange and Teak were known collectively as Operation Newsreel and were rocket boosted. Yucca reached its altitude using balloons.

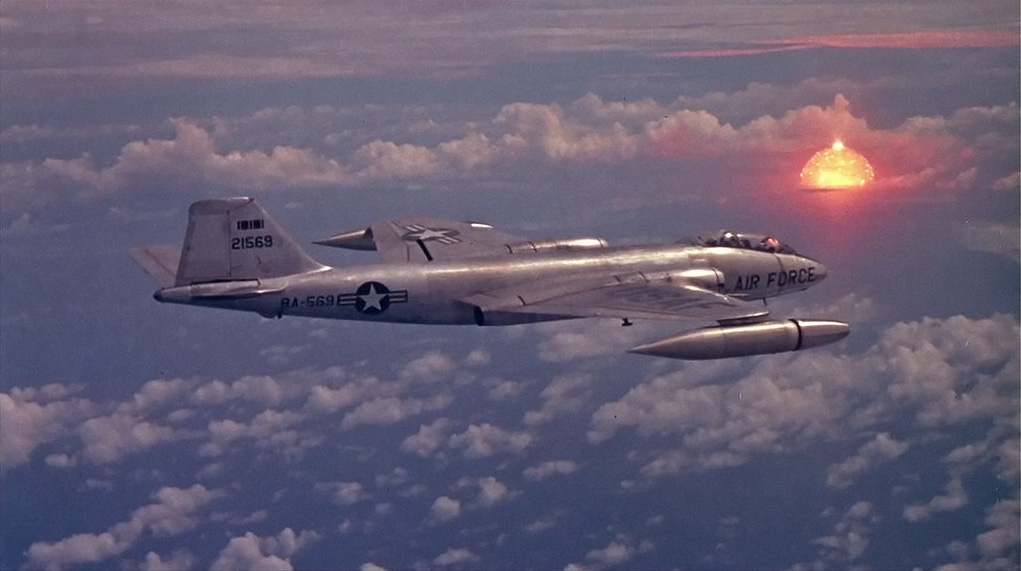
Aerial shot of the explosion during Hardtack I Poplar. Martin RB-57D in the foreground.

== Historical background ==
Many events and proceedings leading up to Operation Hardtack I, such as previous nuclear testing results and the global political atmosphere, influenced its creation and design. One such historical circumstance was that nuclear radiation concerns were mounting publicly and abroad by 1956. During the 1956 Presidential Election, ending nuclear testing was a campaign issue and nuclear safety was one part of that discussion. At the same time, the Union of Soviet Socialist Republics (USSR) was publicly proposing a moratorium on testing.

In 1956 during June, the National Academy of Sciences (NAS) recommended new radiation exposure limits for the general public in a report entitled: "The Biological Effects of Atomic Radiation". The AEC, which was the body that developed nuclear weapons, accepted the NAS recommended radiation exposure limits. Some AEC members asserted that the limits were reached incorrectly and should be reviewed in the future. Charles L. Dunham, AEC Director of the Division of Biology and Medicine (DBM), said that the new limits of nuclear radiation exposure would prevent them from continuing testing in Nevada. Dunham, in association with other AEC offices and officials, made recommendations to move further tests to the Pacific to eliminate the need to determine radiological fallout safety.

Also in 1956, the AEC was designing a test series that included nuclear detonations which would release significant amounts of nuclear fallout. The series came to be known as Operation Plumbbob and took place in 1957 from April 24 to October 7. Operation Plumbbob was followed by Project 58/58A and Operation Hardtack I. At the time of testing, Operation Plumbbob was the most extensive nuclear test series held at the Nevada Test Site. President Eisenhower was very cautious in approving Plumbbob due to public concern. Consequently, the AEC held brief and ultimately fruitless discussions of moving some of the tests in the Plumbbob series to the next planned Pacific Ocean series, Operation Hardtack I, to minimize radioactive fallout in and around the Nevada Test Site.

When Operation Plumbbob began in the spring of 1957, the planning process of Operation Hardtack I was well underway and the number of nuclear detonations planned were more than those in the Plumbbob series. At the same time, radiation and nuclear proliferation concerns around the world had led to formal discussions between the US, USSR, and other countries on the topic of instituting a global ban on nuclear testing as a path to disarmament. In 1957 on August 9 AEC chairman Lewis L. Strauss proposed to President Eisenhower a preliminary plan of Operation Hardtack I. President Eisenhower objected to the length of the four-month testing period and that the plan called for 25 shots, which was one more than in Plumbbob. As a result of the discussion, Eisenhower consented to yields no larger than 15 megatons of TNT (63 PJ), and ordered that the testing period be as brief as possible.

Project 58/58A followed Operation Plumbbob and began almost two months later starting in 1957 on December 6. Project 58/58A was composed of four safety tests; they were not supposed to result in nuclear radiation. All four took place at the Nevada Test Site. The safety tests were intended to ensure that the bombs would not malfunction. However, the test named Coulomb-C which took place in 1957 on December 9 did malfunction. It resulted in an unanticipated 500 tons of TNT (2,100 GJ) blast. The blast released a nuclear radiation fallout cloud that traveled toward Los Angeles and resulted in low levels of nuclear radiation. The bomb failure added to public concern over nuclear testing's safety.

Some tests were cut in an effort to meet Eisenhower's demands for a shorter testing period, but new tests quickly filled their place. AEC chairman Strauss remarked that the large number of shots was due to the "DOD's requirement for an increasing number of different nuclear weapons types". Eisenhower eventually approved the plan for Operation Hardtack I in late January, even though it still contained 25 shots. On March 31, 1958, the USSR announced a suspension of all tests and called on the US to do the same. On May 9 the leader of the Soviet Union, Nikita Khrushchev, accepted Eisenhower's invitation for technical discussions on a nuclear testing moratorium and negotiations began on July 1 of the same year. Eisenhower announced to the US on August 22, 1958, that the ban would begin October 31. US scientists responded by seeking to add more tests to the Hardtack Series in case it turned out to be the last chance. Consequently, Operation Hardtack I consisted of 35 tests.

There was public health concern with the number of shots in Operation Hardtack I. Studies released in March 1958 indicated that people as far as 400 miles (350 nmi; 640 km) away could have severe retinal burns from two of the three high-altitude tests: Teak and Orange. It was then decided that they would be moved to Johnston Island, which was 538 miles (468 nmi; 866 km) from the nearest inhabited island. The high-altitude nuclear tests delivered the first openly reported man-made high-altitude electromagnetic pulses (EMP). Teak, which was detonated at 252,000 feet (76.8 km) and was 3.8 megatons of TNT (16 PJ), produced an aurora-like effect that was visible from Hawaii, 700 nautical miles (810 mi; 1,300 km) displaced from the detonation. Most radio communications immediately dropped across the Pacific Ocean. The blackout in Australia lasted for 9 hours and Hawaii's lasted for no less than 2 hours.

== High-altitude tests ==
Operation Hardtack I contained three high-altitude tests called Operation Newsreel that were designed to study many effects that a nuclear explosion would have on materials and electronic systems. They were also used to test the energy of the explosion and what forms of energy they would produce. Yucca was the name of the first high-altitude test and it was performed near the Enewetak Atoll in the Marshall Islands. The other two high-altitude tests, Orange and Teak, were performed near the Johnston Atoll in the South Pacific Ocean about 1,300 kilometres (810 mi; 700 nmi) southwest of the Hawaiian Islands.

=== Impact on ozone layer ===
There was some uncertainty on whether detonating a nuclear weapon at such high altitudes would cause a hole in the ozone layer. After multiple underwater tests there was evidence to show the energy created by the blast would create ozone. Project leads determined some destruction of ozone would occur which would then be replaced by the ozone created from the explosion. It was agreed that if this theory were wrong, the hole created in the ozone layer would be minuscule enough to cause no harm. Upon completion of Operation Newsreel, it was determined that there was very little evidence of any harm being caused to the natural ozone layer.

=== Yucca ===
Yucca was the first high-altitude test performed during Operation Hardtack I and was detonated on April 28, 1958. It was lifted by a balloon to an altitude of 86,000 feet (26.2 km) and had a yield of 1.7 kilotons of TNT (7.1 TJ).To achieve the altitude needed, the device was attached to a large helium-filled balloon which carried it to the detonation altitude. Due to issues with high winds on Enewetak Island, the balloon launches from ground were unsatisfactory, thus creating the need for a new method. The balloons were then deployed from an aircraft carrier which helped with deployment and the inflation. While the balloons were inflated, they were unable to take too much force from wind or the plastic material of the balloons would tear. While the balloons were inflating on the aircraft carrier, the ship could match and oppose the wind speed allowing for the balloon to be inflated in still air. To make sure the launch would be successful 86 balloon launches were tested.

Due to concerns of failures, many safety measures were employed. While on ground, the bomb used multiple pins to prevent certain safety features of the bomb from being deployed before liftoff. One such pin was used to stop the electrical systems so that the bomb would be unable to be armed. In case of a dud, the bomb would detach from the balloon and be allowed to drop into the ocean where many more safety features would come into action. Some of these features included probes which could detect saltwater which would destroy the electrical system so the conductive seawater could not cause a short which would detonate the bomb. Another concern was a nuclear device floating in the ocean should a misfire occur. To combat this, inserts were created which would dissolve in a few hours, thus scuttling the device.

On the day of the launch many meteorological aspects were taken into account and calculations were done to ensure the bomb would reach the correct altitude. The bomb was loaded onto an aircraft carrier and preparations began. As the balloon was inflated multiple testing devices were connected to the balloon. The readings from these devices would be sent to multiple ships and aircraft so nothing would need to be recovered after the explosion. After all the preparations were done and the balloon was inflated, the device was released and began to climb. After almost three and a half hours of climbing the bomb was detonated at an altitude of 26.2 kilometers (16.3 mi). The aircraft carrier which carried Yucca was approximately 4 kilometers (2.5 mi) from the detonation site. The shock wave from Yucca reached the carrier 3 minutes and 16 seconds after detonation.

The Yucca test had many Department of Defense projects attached to it for research purposes. Alongside testing the use of a balloon carrier, the Department of Defense wanted to research the electromagnetic waves emitted from a nuclear explosion. This test would be used to determine the impact a nuclear explosion would have on electronic devices. All of the data from these Department of Defense projects would be stored on recording devices on surrounding islands and in aircraft so data would not have to be recovered after the test. However, Yucca was carrying five different transmitting devices in canisters to help with research. While the balloon proved to be a great success, no data from the canisters were able to be retrieved due to equipment issues onboard one of the aircraft carriers.

=== Teak ===
The Teak test was launched from Johnston Island on July 31, 1958, and carried a payload of 3.8 megatons of TNT (16 PJ). Teak was the second high-altitude test after the success of Yucca. Instead of a balloon, the warhead for the Teak test would be carried by a Redstone missile; a modified Redstone missile had been used to launch Explorer I in January of the same year. Other nuclear weapons had been tested using the Redstone missile, but until this time the highest payload to have been detonated was 3 kilotons of TNT (13 TJ) during Operation Teapot. Teak would be the first high-altitude test to have a payload in the megaton range. The test was scheduled to take place from the Bikini Atoll. Due to the fact that the payloads of Teak and Orange were much larger than previous high-altitude shots, the test was moved to Johnston Island as to protect nearby native islanders from any retinal damage. As both Teak and Orange had been relocated these two tests were named Operation Newsreel. The name Newsreel came from the fact that these two tests were being moved to Johnston Island.

The safety precautions taken by the teams involved were precisely detailed. The day before the launch 187 team members would evacuate Johnston Island with 727 men the day of the test. This was to keep as few men on the island while still being able to operate the airfield and critical data instruments. Another problem the team members were concerned about was the issue of retinal damage. Since the payload of the bomb was so large, aircraft were scheduled to keep any civilian ships out of a 760 kilometers (470 mi) radius of Johnston Island. Additionally, the Civil Aeronautics Authority was informed that it would be dangerous for any aircraft to fly within 965 kilometers (600 mi) of Johnston Island. On the day of the test only about 175 men remained on Johnston Island to prepare for Teak to be launched and other various duties needed after.

At 11:47 PM on July 31 Teak was launched; after 3 minutes it was detonated. Due to programming issues, the warhead detonated directly above Johnston Island. At time of detonation the rocket had flown to an altitude of 76.2 kilometers (47.3 mi). The explosion could be seen from Hawaii 1,297 kilometers (806 mi) away and was said to be visible for almost half an hour. After the explosion, high frequency long-distance communication was interrupted across the Pacific. Due to this communication failure Johnston Island was unable to contact their superiors to advise of the test results until about eight hours after the detonation. Thirty minutes after detonation, a crew was sent out to collect the pod which had detached from the missile carrying the warhead. The pod had been irradiated and to handle it the crew members used disposable gloves in an attempt to protect themselves from beta radiation.

During the Teak test all crew on and around Johnston Island were given protective eyewear to prevent flash blindness from the explosion. After the explosion it was found that besides the hazard of blindness, thermal radiation was another concern—even at an altitude of 76 kilometers (47 mi). A crew member who was on Johnston Island at the time was said to have received a slight sunburn from the amount of thermal radiation which had reached the island. While only slight to the crew member it created issues for the local fauna. Many birds were seen on Johnston Island in distress. Unsure if this was caused by blindness or thermal radiation, the project members decided to take precautions to protect local wildlife during the Orange test.

=== Orange ===
Orange was launched twelve days after Teak on August 11, 1958. Orange, like Teak, was launched using a Redstone Missile and had a yield of 3.8 megatons of TNT (16 PJ). The same safety precautions used by Teak were implemented for the Orange launch. Seeing how smoothly the evacuation for the Teak launch went, it was decided that the evacuation did not need to occur the day before the launch and eight hundred and eight men were evacuated on August 11 to an aircraft carrier about 70 kilometers (43 mi) northeast of the island. Along with protection for the project crew, it was decided after Teak that Sand Island, a local bird refuge, would need protection from the blast as well. To make sure that most of the wildlife was safe a smoke screen was created over Sand Island. Due to interest in Hawaii, it was announced on August 11 that there would be a nuclear test sometime between 10 PM and 6 AM.

The rocket carrying the warhead was launched at 11:27 from Johnston Island and traveled south. Like Teak, the flight lasted 3 minutes and was detonated at 11:30 PM about 41 kilometers (25 mi) south of Johnston Island at an altitude of about 43 kilometers (27 mi).The trajectory of Orange was a major success after the incident with Teak being detonated directly over the island. The recovery crew for the pod that was with Orange was unable to locate the research pod which had been launched with the rocket. Although Orange was visible from Hawaii it was not the great spectacle Teak had been. The light from the blast was visible for about 5 minutes. The explosion had also been slightly obscured to the crew at Johnston Island by cloud coverage. The blast from Orange did not cause the large communication interruption that Teak had caused, but some commercial flights to Hawaii were said to have lost contact with air traffic controllers for a short period of time.

== Surface tests ==
Of the 35 nuclear tests in Operation Hardtack I, four were surface burst shots: Cactus, Koa, Quince and Fig. These tests took place from May to August 1958, all at the Enewetak Atoll. Surface tests inherently present the potential for more radioactive exposure issues than the high-altitude or underwater detonations. This is because there is more material present to be converted to radioactive debris by excess neutrons due to the proximity to the Earth's surface, and due to the soil and other minerals excavated from the craters created by these blasts. The existence of this extra material allows for larger radioactive particles to be created and lifted into the blast cloud, falling back to the surface as fallout.Though surface and near-surface tests have a higher probability of radioactive exposure problems, the radioactive elements have significantly shorter residence times when injected into the atmosphere. As radioactive clouds from surface-type tests reach heights of around 20 kilometers (12 mi) at maximum, and thus cannot extend higher than the lower stratosphere, the residence times can be up to 13 years less than the high-altitude blasts. During original concept planning in 1954, Enewetak was supposed to be the location of the smaller tests conducted during Operation Hardtack I. Due to poor weather conditions and policy changes in 1958, five of the UCRL tests which were planned to be conducted at the Bikini Atoll were moved to Enewetak. This included the later two surface blast devices in the Quince and Fig tests.

=== Cactus ===
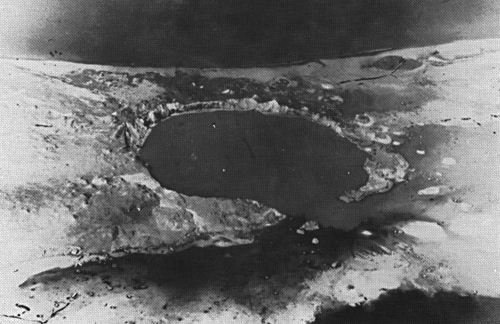
Operation Hardtack I Cactus shot Crater on Runit Island

The Cactus test took place May 6, 1958 at approximately 0615. An 18 kilotons of TNT (75 TJ) land-surface type shot was detonated on a platform at the northern tip of Runit, Enewetak in the second of the 35 tests for Operation Hardtack I.The initial cloud from the explosion reached as high as 19,000 feet (5.79 km) within the first ten minutes, and settled at around 15,000 feet (4.57 km) by 20 minutes after detonation. The nuclear fallout prediction map proved to be accurate in determining the span and the intensity of the resultant fallout.Measured peak intensity of fallout reached 440 R at hour three directly above blast site on the North end of the Atoll. At mid-island the radiation was measured to be 1.7 R. The southern tip received a very small amount of radiation, 0.005 R due to the easterly winds.

Out of the eight Programs listed, DOD-affiliated Projects 1.4, 1.7, 1.8, 1.9, 1.12, 2.8, 3.2, 5.2, 5.3, 6.4, 6.5 and 6.6 involved the Cactus test.

One of the goals of this test was to study the physical characteristics of the crater and the surrounding area pre- and post-detonation associated with Project 1.4. A camera was mounted to a RB-50 aircraft and the resultant crater was mapped using photogrammetry. Measurements were taken from 500 feet (152 m) down to ground zero for both pre- and post detonation. Survey measurements of the Cactus test could not be made until the resultant radiation amounts had lowered to safer levels. Along with photogrammetric radial measurements, Airblast measurements were also recorded near surface zero for Cactus in accordance with Project 1.7. Similar to Project 1.8, Project 1.9 sought to determine transmission of blast pressure through the ground soil. Forty-three drums were buried at varying depths 600 feet (180 m) from ground zero of the Cactus detonation. Individuals from the Air Force Ballistic Missile Division—TRW Space Technologies Laboratory sought to the Shock Spectra Studies of Project 1.12. Measurement gauges were located between 625 and 965 feet (191 and 294 m) from the blast site. Fallout measurements and samples were taken by aircraft in the aftermath of the detonation, as part of Project 2.8. These surveys were designed in part to determine the impact of specific radionuclides to overall nuclear fallout. Samples were taken early post-blast using a new rocket sampler, the UCRL, which were then followed by B-57D and WB-50 aircraft. Between four and twenty-four hours post-detonation, the WB-50 collected several samples at 1,000 feet (300 m) in altitude. Project 3.2 involved structural tests of corrugated steel arches. One of these arches was placed 980 feet (300 m) away from the Cactus blast site. Eight days after the test, a crew of 13 men were allowed near the surface zero in order to extract the arch. The extraction took around twelve hours, and the radioactivity levels reached a maximum at 0.420 R/hr during this time. Project 5.2 sought to determine the effects of the blast on two A4D-1 aircraft, both in thermal radiation and pressure. Nine film badges were placed throughout each aircraft in order to measure radiation. The Gamma dosimeter worn by the pilot in aircraft 827 indicated a neutron exposure level of 0.105 rem. There is not information available for the dosimeter worn by the pilot in aircraft 831. Radiation recorded by six of the nine film badges ranged from 0.49 R-1.74 R. Information from the remaining three film badges, located at the Pilot's right leg, left sleeve, and left vest is not available. The pilot's exposures were both greater than 3 R. Project 5.3 was very similar to 5.2, focusing on the effects of the blast on the structure of two test FJ-4 aircraft. Radiation from film badges on aircraft 467 ranged from 0.52 R-3.71 R, and 1.23 R-5.06 R for aircraft number 310. In Project 6.4, the Army Signal Research and Development Laboratory (SRDL) investigated the electromagnetic pulses post-detonation, using two instruments, one at Wotho (roughly 240 nautical miles (280 mi; 440 km) from Enewetak) and one at Kusaie (around 440 nautical miles (510 mi; 810 km) from Enewetak). Though Cactus is mentioned in Project 6.5, whose goal was to study the radar echoes from the fireball, it is not clear what destroyers were involved if any. Destroyers for the Teak, Fir and Yucca tests are explicitly stated. Project 6.6, the last of the projects that involved the Cactus test, sought to measure the physical properties of the stabilized radioactive cloud following the blast.

=== Koa ===
At 06:30 on May 13, the Koa surface device was detonated at the western side of Dridrilbwij. The size of the blast was 1.37 megatons of TNT (5.7 PJ), around 76 times larger than the yield of the previous surface test, Cactus. The test was conducted in a large water tank. Within 17 minutes of the blast, surface clouds reached approximately 60,000 feet (18 km). Nuclear fallout predictions for Koa were larger and covered a broader range than Cactus, with significantly higher radiation levels, an order of magnitude larger, in the immediate region surrounding the blast. There had been a larger nuclear barge detonation, the 1.85 megatons of TNT (7.7 PJ) Apache test, off the island of Dridrilbwij two years prior in 1956, during which the island survived. The detonation of the Koa device, however, caused complete destruction of the island.

The Department of Defense (DOD) sponsored a series of experiments for Koa: Projects 1.4, 1.7, 1.8, 1.9, 1.12, 2.9, 3.2, 3.6, 5.1, 5.3. 6.4, 6.5, 6.6, 6.9. and 6.11. Project 1.4, which sought to study land craters post detonation for several shots, took ground survey measurements from surface zero out to 2,500 feet (760 m). Detailed measurements could not be made until four days after the blast due to radiation levels. Using a boat, the majority of the crater was mapped, though some measurements could not be made until 1959 due to radioactivity levels around the Koa blast site. In Project 1.9, the blast-induced pressure through the soil was measured by burying 43 drums at depths ranging from 0 to 20 feet (0.0 to 6.1 m) and around 3,000 feet (910 m) feet from the Koa blast site. The early radioactive cloud samples, normally collected post-shot as a part of Project 2.8 using a UCRL rocket sampler, were not collected after the Koa test due to technical difficulties. Fallout at high and low altitudes using B-57D and WB-50 aircraft were measured with no technical problems. Project 3.6, which was conducted only on Koa, tested the effects of the blast on reinforced-concrete slabs buried close to surface zero. One station was located at 1,830 feet (560 m) from the blast site, and the other was located 3,100 feet (940 m) away. Project 5.2 was designed to measure the radiation levels using film badges on different areas of the aircraft and on the pilot directly. Koa had the lowest average radiation measurements of the eight shots on this project, with aircraft 827 ranging from 0.01-0.02R and aircraft 831 reporting levels between 0.03-0.19R. Unlike in the Cactus test, all nine film badges from both aircraft were successfully recovered and reported.

=== Quince and Fig ===
Quince and Fig were a series of surface shots that occurred in early August at the center of Runit. They were the last of the Hardtack tests conducted at the Enewetak Atoll. Quince was detonated at 2:15pm on August 6, 1958. Twelve days later, the Fig device was detonated on August 18, 1958, at 4:00pm. Quince and Fig were UCRL devices with co-sponsorship through the DOD and the AEC, though the main focus of these tests was weapons development. One of the main differences between these two tests was that over 130 tons of soil from the Nevada Test Site had been shipped in and was placed at surface zero of the Fig test. The radioactive cloud from the Quince blast rose to 1,500 feet (460 m). As Runit was to also be the detonation site for Fig, the area had to be decontaminated after the Quince test. Around 3 to 5 inches (76 to 127 mm) of contaminated topsoil was removed from an area 75 by 25 feet (22.9 by 7.6 m) upwind of ground zero. An area of 60 square feet (5.6 m^{2}) at the blast site was scraped to remove the top three inches of soil as well. Even with these precautions, the measured alpha activity was around 20,000 counts per minute (CPM), and the area closest to surface zero was roped off to prevent personnel from entering. Upon detonation, the mushroom cloud produced by the Fig device rose to approximately 6,000 feet (1.8 km), with a base of roughly 4,300 feet (1.3 km). Thirty minutes post detonation, radiation measurements at the blast site reached over 10,000 R/hr.

The DOD experiments for Quince and Fig included Projects 1.4, 1.7. 2.4, 2.9, 2.10, 2.11, 2.14. and 8.7.

== Barge tests ==
Barge mounted test detonations was a technique first used in 1954, and also compensated for the lack of land at the HP. When testing returned to Bikini atoll the use of barges as the shot point had begun, with one notable advantage, no radioactive surface zero areas were developed. Two large underwater craters were formed in 1954 and these were used as subsequent surface zeros for detonations fired from barges. This allowed the available land area to be used for the placement of measurement instrumentation and reuse of the same burst point without the long delays required for radiological cooling by natural decay or expensive and long decontamination procedures. Reuse of zero points also allowed reuse of instrument locations and recording shelters for several tests saving construction costs and time and increasing test-scheduling flexibility. In HARDTACK the 26 barge events used only five detonation areas.

=== Fir ===
FIR predicted fallout, surface radiological exclusion (radex) areas, ship position, and aircraft participation. FIR was the first Bikini detonation of the Hardtack series. Detonated at 0550 on May 12, 1958. Fır was detonated on a barge in the Bravo crater, producing a 1.36 megatons of TNT (5.7 PJ) yield range. After detonation, the cloud rose to 60,000 to 90,000 feet (18.3–27.4 km). The FIR detonation was shortly followed by BUTTERNUT detonation on Enewetak 25 minutes later. DOD-sponsored experiments for FIR included Projects 3.7, 5.1, 6.4, 6.5, 6.6 and 6.11.

=== Butternut ===
BUTTERNUT predicted fallout, surface radiological exclusion areas (radex), ship positions, and aircraft participation. Butternut was detonated at 0615 on May 12, 1958, 25 minutes after FIR had been detonated at Enewetak. BUTTERNUT was detonated on a barge 4,000 feet (1.22 km) west of Runit, producing a yield range of 81 kilotons of TNT (340 TJ). The cloud rose to 35,000 feet (11 km), stabilizing at 30,000 feet (9.1 km). The DOD-sponsored experiments for BUTTERNUT were Projects 5.1, 5.2, 5.3, 6.5, 6.6, and 6.9.

=== Holly ===
HOLLY predicted fallout, surface radiological exclusion (radex) areas, ship positions, and aircraft participation. HOLLY was detonated at 0630 on May 21, 1958, on a barge west of Runit, 4,000 feet (1.22 km) from the nearest edge of the island, producing a 5.9 kilotons of TNT (25 TJ) yield range. The detonation produced a 15,000 feet (4.6 km) cloud that stabilized at an altitude of 12,000 feet (3.7 km) at the top and 7,500 feet (2.3 km) at its base. Project 6.6, was the only DOD-sponsored experiment for HOLLY, and was conducted on Enewetak Island.

=== Nutmeg ===
NUTMEG predicted fallout, surface radiological exclusion area (radex), ship positions, and aircraft participation. The second Bikini shot, NUTMEG, was detonated at 0920 on May 22, 1958. NUTMEG was detonated on a barge in the ZUNI crater, and produced a 25.1 kilotons of TNT (105 TJ) yield range. The detonation cloud stabilized at 20,000 feet (6.1 km) by 0926. DOD-sponsored experiments for NUTMEG were Projects 6.3, 6.3a, 6.4, 6.5, 6.6, and 6.11. Projects 6.3 and 6.3a had stations near the burst point on Eneman Island.

=== Yellowwood ===
YELLOWWOOD predicted fallout, surface radiological (radix) exclusion area, and ship positions. YELLOWWOOD was detonated at 1400 on May 26, 1958. YELLOWWOOD was detonated on a barge 5,000 feet (1.5 km) southwest of Enjebi, and produced a 330 kilotons of TNT (1,400 TJ) yield range. The DOD sponsored 13 experiments for YELLOWWOOD: Projects 2.4, 2.8, 3.7, 5.1, 5.2, 5.3, 6.4, 6.5, 6.6, 6.8, 6.9, 6.11, and 8.1. Instrument stations for Project 2.4 were located on buoys in the lagoon. The remaining projects had more distant stations or were primarily airborne.

=== Magnolia ===
Predicted fallout, surface radiological exclusion (radix) area, ship positions, and aircraft participation. MAGNOLIA was detonated at 0600 on May 27, 1958. MAGONLIA was detonated on a barge 3,000 feet (914 m) southwest of the center of Runit, and produced a 57 kilotons of TNT (240 TJ) yield range. The detonation produced a 44,000-foot (13.4 km) cloud that stabilized at 41,000 feet (12.5 km) with its base at 15,000 feet (4.6 km). The DOD-sponsored experiments for MAGNOLIA were Projects: 3.7, 5.2, and 5.3. Instruments for Project 3.7 were on Boken, Enjebi, and Runit.

=== Tobacco ===
TOBACCO predicted fallout, surface radiological exclusion (radix) area, ship positions, and aircraft participation. TOBACCO was detonated at 1415 on May 30, 1958. TOBACCO was detonated on a barge 3,000 feet (914 m) northwest of Enjebi, and produced an 11.6 kilotons of TNT (49 TJ) yield range. The detonation produced an 18,000-foot (5.5 km) cloud that stabilized at 16,000 feet (4.9 km) by 1430. The DOD-sponsored experiments for TOBACCO were Projects 3.7, 5.1, 5.2, 5.3, and 6.8. The project activity for Project 3.7 was on Boken, Enjebi, and Runit. Project 6.8 simply monitored TOBACCO from stations off Enewetak and Parry islands.

=== Sycamore ===
SYCAMORE predicted fallout, surface radiological exclusion (radex) area, ship positions, and aircraft participation. SYCAMORE was detonated at 1500 on May 31, 1958. SYCAMORE was detonated on a barge moored in the BRAVO crater, and produced a 92 kilotons of TNT (380 TJ) yield range. DOD-sponsored experiments for SYCAMORE were Projects: 3.7, 5.1, 6.4, 6.5, 6.6, and 6.11. Only Project 6.11 had an instrument site at the Bikini Atoll.

=== Maple ===
MAPLE predicted fallout, surface radiological exclusion (radex) area, ship positions, and aircraft participation. MAPLE was detonated on June 11 at 0530 1958. MAPLE was detonated on a barge just south of Lomilik, and produced a 213 kilotons of TNT (890 TJ) yield range. The 40,000 feet (12.2 km) cloud produced by the detonation was tracked by radar from Benner. The DOD-sponsored experiments for MAPLE were Projects 5.1, 6.3, and 6.3a. Projects 6.3 and 6.3a shared the same, rather close-in sites on Lomilik.

=== Aspen ===
ASPEN predicted fallout, surface radiological exclusion (radex) areas, ship positions, and aircraft participation. ASPEN was detonated on 15 June 58 at 0530. ASPEN was detonated on a barge in the BRAVO crater of Bikini, 4,000 ft (1.22 km) southwest of Nam. ASPEN produced a 319 kilotons of TNT (1,330 TJ) yield range. The detonation produced a 48,600-foot (14.8 km) cloud as measured by radar from Benner. No experiments were sponsored by the DOD for this shot.

=== Walnut ===
WALNUT predicted fallout, surface radiological exclusion (radex) areas, ship positions, and aircraft participation. WALNUT was detonated on June 15, 1958, at 0630, 1 hour after the ASPEN event at Bikini. WALNUT was detonated on a barge 5,000 feet (1.5 km) southwest of Enjebi Island in Enewetak. The detonation produced a 61,000 feet (18.6 km) cloud, and produced a 1.45 megatons of TNT (6.1 PJ) yield range. The DOD-sponsored experiments for WALNUT included Projects 2.4, 2.8, 3.7, 5.1, 5.2, 5.3, and 8.1.

=== Linden ===
LINDEN predicted fallout, surface radiological exclusion (radex) area, ship positions, and aircraft participation. LINDEN was detonated on June 18, 1958, at 1500. LINDEN was detonated on a barge 4,000 ft (1.22 km) west of the center of Runit Island at Enewetak. The detonation produced a 20,000-foot (6.1 km) cloud with a 7,000-foot (2.1 km) base, and produced an 11 kilotons of TNT (46 TJ) yield range. No DOD-sponsored experiments were conducted during LINDEN.

=== Redwood ===
REDWOOD predicted fallout, surface radiological exclusion (radex) areas, ship positions, and aircraft participation. REDWOOD was detonated on June 28, 1958, at 0530. REDWOOD was detonated on a barge south of Lomilik in Bikini. REDWOOD was followed by the ELDER detonation at Enewetak Atoll one hour later. The detonation cloud base was at 28,000 feet (8.5 km) and the top stabilized at 55,000 feet (16.8 km), and produced a 412 kilotons of TNT (1,720 TJ) yield range. The only DOD-sponsored experiment for REDWOOD was Project 5.1.

=== Elder ===
ELDER predicted fallout, surface radiological exclusion (radex) areas, ship positions, and aircraft participation. ELDER, detonated on June 28, 1958, at 0630. ELDER was the second of a tandem shot with REDWOOD (detonated an hour earlier on Bikini). ELDER was detonated on a barge 1 nautical mile (1.2 mi; 1.9 km) southeast of Enjebi Island in Enewetak. Initial cloud height had been well over 65,000 feet (19.8 km), and produced an 880 kilotons of TNT (3,700 TJ) yield range. The only DOD-sponsored experiment for ELDER was project 5.1.

=== Oak ===
OAK predicted fallout, surface radiological exclusion (radex) area, and ship positions. OAK, one of the largest detonations at Enewetak Atoll, and was fired at 0730 on June 29, 1958. OAK was detonated on a barge moored on the reef 21,000 feet (6.40 km) southwest of Bokoluo Island. It was followed at noon by the HICKORY shot at Bikini. The initial height of the cloud was estimated to be 78,000 feet (23.8 km), and produced an 8.9 megatons of TNT (37 PJ) yield range. Two DOD-sponsored experiments were included for OAK: Projects 2.8 and 5.1.

Predicted yield for Oak was 7.5 megatonnes of TNT (31 PJ).

=== Hickory ===
HICKORY predicted fallout, surface radiological exclusion (radex) area, ship positions, and aircraft participation. HICKORY was detonated on June 29, 1958, at 1200. HICKORY was detonated on a barge off the west end of Enema at Bikini, 4½ hours after the OAK shot at Enewetak Atoll. The detonation cloud rose to 24,200 feet (7.4 km) with an estimated 12,000-foot (3.7 km) base, and produced a 14 kilotons of TNT (59 TJ) yield range. Projects 6.3 and 6.3a were the only DOD-sponsored experiments for HICKORY.

=== Sequoia ===
SEQUOIA predicted fallout, surface radiological exclusion (radex) area, ship positions, and aircraft participation. SEQUOIA was detonated on July 2, 1958, at 0630. SEQUOIA was detonated on a barge 2,000 feet (610 m) west-northwest of Runit Island at Enewetak. The cloud stabilized at 15,000 feet (4.57 km), and produced a 52 kilotons of TNT (220 TJ) yield range. SEQUIA had no DOD-sponsored experiments.

=== Cedar ===
CEDAR predicted fallout, surface radiological exclusion (radex) area, ship positions, and aircraft participation. CEDAR was detonated on July 3, 1958, at 0530. CEDAR was detonated on a barge in the BRAVO crater southwest of Nam, 4,000 feet (1.2 km) from the edge of the island at Bikini. The CEDAR detonation produced a 50,000-foot (15.2 km) cloud, and produced a 220 kilotons of TNT (920 TJ) yield range. The only DOD-sponsored experiment for CEDAR was Project 5.1.

=== Dogwood ===
DOGWOOD predicted fallout, surface radiological exclusion (radex) area, ship positions, and aircraft participation. DOGWOOD was detonated on July 6, 1958, at 0630. DOGWOOD was detonated on a barge southwest of Enjebi, 4,000 feet (1.22 km) from the edge of the island at Enewetak. The cloud rose to 58,000 feet (17.7 km), stabilizing at 54,000 feet (16.5 km) with a 35,000-foot (10.7 km) base, and produced a 397 kilotons of TNT (1,660 TJ) yield range. The only DOD-sponsored experiment for DOGWOOD Was Project 5.1.

=== Poplar ===
POPLAR predicted fallout, surface radiological exclusion (radex) area, ship positions, and aircraft participation. POPLAR was detonated on July 12, 1958, at 1530. POPLAR was detonated on a barge southwest of Nam, at Bikini. The detonation cloud quickly rose above the tracking radar limits of 61,000 feet (18.6 km), and the base was established at 42,000 feet (12.8 km) at 1540, and produced a 9.3 megatons of TNT (39 PJ) yield range. The only DOD-sponsored experiment for POPLAR was Project 3.7.

=== Scaevola ===
SCAEVOLA predicted fallout, surface radiological exclusion (radex) area, ship positions, and aircraft participation. Scaevola was detonated on July 14, 1958, at 1600. Scaevola was detonated on a barge west of Runit Island at Enewetak. Its yield was low and the explosion did not destroy the shot barge but only damaged it, producing a 0 kilotons of TNT (0 TJ) yield range. No DOD-sponsored experiments were scheduled for Scaevola.

=== Pisonia ===
PISONIA predicted fallout, surface radiological exclusion (radex) area, ship positions, and aircraft participation. PISONIA was detonated on July 18, 1958, at 1100. PISONIA was detonated on a barge 10,000 feet (3.05 km) west of Runit Island at Enewetak. The cloud rose immediately to 55,000 feet (16.8 km), and produced a 255 kilotons of TNT (1,070 TJ) yield range. No DOD-sponsored experiments were scheduled for PISONIA.

=== Juniper ===
JUNIPER predicted fallout, surface radiological exclusion (radex) area, ship positions, and aircraft participation. JUNIPER, the last nuclear detonation to occur at Bikini, was detonated on July 22, 1958, at 1620. JUNIPER was detonated on a barge 4,000 feet (1.22 km) from the west end of Eneman in the Redwing Zuni crater at Bikini. The detonation cloud rose to 40,000 feet (12.2 km) with an estimated 24,000-foot (7.32 km) base, and produced a 65 kilotons of TNT (270 TJ) yield range. No DOD-sponsored experiments were scheduled for JUNIPER.

=== Olive ===
OLIVE predicted fallout, surface radiological exclusion (radex) area, ship positions, and aircraft participation. OLIVE was detonated on July 23, 1958, at 0830. OLIVE was detonated on a barge southwest of Enjebi Island, at Enewetak Atoll. 4,000 feet (1.22 km) from the nearest land at Enewetak. The cloud rose to 50,000 feet (15.2 km) with an estimated 15,000-foot (4.57 km) base, and produced a 202 kilotons of TNT (850 TJ) yield range. No DOD-sponsored experiments were scheduled for OLIVE.

=== Pine ===
PINE predicted fallout, surface radiological exclusion (radex) area, ship positions, and aircraft participation. PINE was detonated on July 27, 1958, at 0830. PINE was detonated on a barge southwest of Enjebi Island, 8,500 feet (1.40 nmi; 1.61 mi; 2.6 km) from the nearest land, at Enewetak. The cloud rose quickly to 66,000 feet (20.1 km) with an estimated 38,000-foot (11.6 km) base as measured by radar, and produced a 2 megatons of TNT (8.4 PJ) yield range. No DOD-sponsored experiments were scheduled for PINE.

== Underwater tests ==
Underwater tests were conducted to assess the damages to Navy boats and materials. The location for these tests was Enewetak due to the uniformity of the sea bottom in the area. This is critical for the tests so that proper moorings of the target ships can be secured on the sea floor. The underwater explosions create a bubble from the expended energy of the blast. This bubble is due to the vaporization of water that directly absorbs the heat of the blast. This bubble may break the surface depending on how much energy is dispersed and the depth of the nuclear device. The bubble displaces large amounts of water that then collapses in on the bubble after all the energy is expended. The water collapsing in on the cavity is called the "radioactive pool" and has the highest concentration of radioactive material.

Many different projects were put in place to test the two underwater blasts. Wave generation, hydrodynamic variables, and energy released were all studied using multiple sensors. These sensors were placed in multiple areas such as target ships and floating balloons. Oceanographic, seismographic and hydrographic surveys were completed after each nuclear blast. A project that used a nuclear blast to clear minefields was studied using the Umbrella blast. One hundred and twenty inert mines were placed at different distances ranging from 1,500 to 8,000 feet (460 to 2,440 m). These mines were then picked out of the water to study the effects of the blast at each interval.

=== Radiation preparations ===
Another reason for underwater tests was to detect radiation contamination of ships after an underwater nuclear explosion. This meant that the contaminated ships required unique "radsafe" preparations so that the data could be quickly accounted for. After the data on the damage and radiation was recorded, the ships needed decontamination work completed before repairs could be completed. The Radiological and Decontamination Unit consisting of 200 enlisted and one officer was created for the task of decontamination. After decontamination, the target ships were repaired for use in a second underwater nuclear weapons test. The amount of radiation exposure was debated for the safety of the crews. Roentgens (1 R = ca 0,01 Gy in soft tissue) were used to gauge the gamma radiation that affected the units working on the nuclear tests.

For the underwater test crew, a limit of 5 R per blast along with 10 R per operation was referenced as the limit for exposure. These initial limits were rejected and maximum permissible exposure standards (MPE) were solidified by commanders for the crews working on the decontamination unit. Due to the fast recovery of ships, high contamination values were expected by commanders and set the standard to four roentgens per hour (R/hr). An excess of 4 R/hr was designated off limits of recovery units. Personnel were given special breathing equipment to work in the interior of ships with an R/hr higher than one. High numbers of personnel working the tests were used to keep individuals within the MPE. Times were calculated to keep the total exposure below two roentgens for the personnel working on the ships. A floating decontamination facility was created on board a transport ship for the Wahoo and Umbrella nuclear tests. This allowed important data analysis and an increase in recovery efficiency.

=== Wahoo preparation ===
The nuclear explosion was carried out in open ocean outside of Enewetak. This nuclear test codenamed Wahoo was the first underwater test in the Operation Hardtack series. This test could be considered a continuation of the Wigwam nuclear blast (a deep water nuclear test 500 nautical miles (930 km; 580 mi) off the coast of San Diego). Like its predecessor, the Wahoo shot was a scientific program that studied the effects of an underwater nuclear blast on Navy systems. The nuclear device was positioned 500 feet (150 m) deep in the Pacific Ocean. This deep water test required precise targeting arrays to be set up around the blast location, which presented unique problems for the arrays as the winds, sea currents and tides needed to be within certain limits for the data to be accurate. Testing arrays were placed at depths of 400 to 800 fathoms (2,400 to 4,800 ft; 730 to 1,460 m) around the nuclear device. The deep water mooring systems needed for the test proved to be difficult to position, leading many analysts to believe the data skewed. The target ships to be used for this program consisted of three destroyers, an active submarine, a submarine mockup used in Wigwam tests, and a merchant marine ship. It was predicted that no air blast or thermal effects would be presented from the underwater blast. The fallout from the blast was also predicted to stay within the target array due to the southwest surface winds.

=== Wahoo blast ===
The test conditions were met on May 16 allowing for the nuclear device to be detonated. Within a second of detonation, a spray dome was created that reached a height of 840 feet (260 m) after seven seconds. The overall shape of the spray dome resembled a cone with 45 degree sloped sides. Plumes were seen breaking through the spray dome after six seconds in every direction. The vertical plume continued rising until 12 seconds after the blast while the lateral plumes traveled for 20 seconds before collapsing. The diameter of the spray dome was approximately 3,800 feet (1,200 m) at the 20 second mark. The base surge reached a radius of 8,000 feet (2,400 m) in the downwind direction after 1.7 seconds. The downwind surge aided by a 15 knots (17 mph; 28 km/h) wind reached speeds of 21 knots (24 mph; 39 km/h). This base surge could be seen for three and a half minutes and for longer from the air as it continued to move across the ocean. When the spray dome and base surge had dissipated, a foam patch could be seen spreading from the surface zero water to reach over 6,000 feet (1,800 m). The nuclear blast was calculated to be 9 kilotons of TNT (38 TJ). All fallout stayed within the predicted fallout area with a maximum of 0.030 R/hr. The target ship at 5,900 yards (2.9 nmi; 3.4 mi; 5.4 km) was directly hit by the shockwave, vibrating the entire ship and shaking it violently. The Moran merchant marine ship moored at 2,346 feet (715 m) away was immobilized due to shock damage to its main and auxiliary equipment while also suffering minor hull damage. One hour and ten minutes after detonation, a five-gallon water sample was taken directly above the blast location showing 5 R/hr. The retrieval team entered a 3.8 R/hr field after an hour and thirty five minutes.

=== Umbrella preparation ===
The second underwater explosion of the Operation Hardtack series was code-named Umbrella. This test was conducted in the lagoon inside Enewetak. This test could be considered a continuation of underwater test Baker, which was conducted in Bikini Lagoon. Explosions in shallow water can create an underwater crater if close enough to the bottom. The target ships from the Wahoo test were towed into the lagoon to be used again for the Umbrella test. The damage from Wahoo was minor in all cases with the exception of the Moran which required extra refurbishing of the hull. These ships had to be washed down and have the measuring equipment replaced before being put into use. The mooring for Umbrella was considerably easier than for Wahoo due to the location and depth of the lagoon. Information gathered from the Wahoo shot directly affected the Umbrella plans with regard to target array placement and decontamination times. The device was placed with a buoy at a depth of 150 feet (46 m).

=== Umbrella blast ===
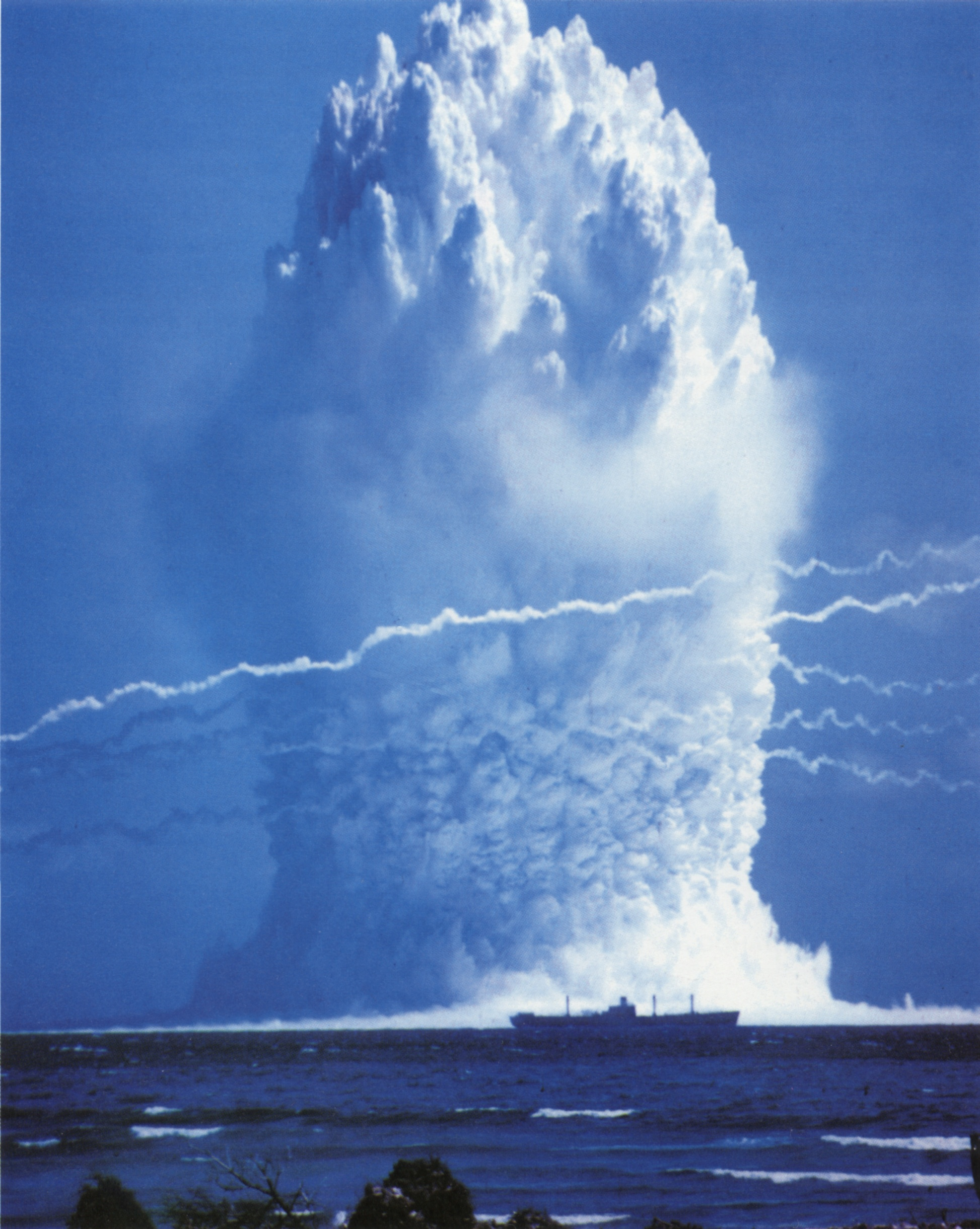
The Umbrella blast on June 9 with the SS Michael Moran in front.

June 9 saw the second underwater nuclear test of the Hardtack I series. The detonation occurred at 11:15 AM (local time) with clear skies and a 15 to 17 knots (17 to 20 mph; 28 to 31 km/h) wind from the east-northeast. Within one-tenth of a second, the spray dome had broken through the surface. The overall shape of the spray dome resembled a vertical column with the plumes helping create the shape. Within 20 seconds of detonation, the maximum height of the column reached 5,000 feet (1,500 m). The base surge reached a distance around 10,000 feet (3,000 m) downwind, reaching out approximately 6,000 feet (1,800 m) in all directions. This base surge could be seen from the air for about 25 minutes and the foam patch over the blast location lasting even longer. The blast yield of the nuclear device was measured to be 8 kilotons of TNT (33 TJ). The Umbrella blast created a crater 3,000 ft (910 m) in diameter and 20 ft (6.1 m) in depth in the lagoon. The maximum radiation reading was found to be 0.350 R/hr by an aircraft flying over the blast location. Radiation was reported to be of small portions, and re-entry was granted 30 minutes after detonation. Out of the major target ships, the highest radiation reading was logged at 0.0015 R/hr of the stern of the Moran. After all scientific data had been gathered from the target ships, they were restored to be seaworthy and towed back to Pearl Harbor. The Moran was concluded to be unseaworthy due to the blast and was sunk by naval gunfire near Ikuren Island.

The underwater nuclear tests (Wahoo and Umbrella) gathered scientific data that helped the Department of Defense understand the effects of nuclear weapons on Navy ships. Some of the key points found were that underwater nuclear blasts create less fallout due to the absorption of radioactive material in the water and vaporized droplets. Direct gamma radiation was found to be extremely low, but the base surge was found to be highly radioactive as it passed measurement devices. Smaller radiation concentrations followed in waves mimicking the initial base surge. Almost all free-field radiation activity was found to disappear after fifteen minutes allowing for return to normal operations. The impact of shock waves was less than previously expected. The damage from the shockwave was found to be negligible on the destroyers at the ranges tested, but equipment failure from the blast could immobilize the ships. The preliminary tests of explosive tapered charges were proven to simulate the shock waves of a nuclear device according to the data gathered.

== Gallery ==
Hardtack I-Juniper, 65-kilotons

Hardtack I-Poplar, 9.3-megatons.

Hardtack I-Umbrella, 8-kilotons.

Hardtack I-Olive, 202-kilotons.

Hardtack I-Fig, 0.02-kilotons.

Hardtack I-Oak, 8.9-megatons.

== List of tests ==
United States' Hardtack I series tests and detonations
Name (Note: The US, France and Great Britain have code-named their test events, while the USSR and China did not, and therefore have only test numbers (with some exceptions – Soviet peaceful explosions were named). Word translations into English in parentheses unless the name is a proper noun. A dash followed by a number indicates a member of a salvo event. The US also sometimes named the individual explosions in such a salvo test, which results in "name1 – 1(with name2)". If test is canceled or aborted, then the row data like date and location discloses the intended plans, where known.)	Date time (UT)	Local time zone (Note: To convert the UT time into standard local, add the number of hours in parentheses to the UT time; for local daylight saving time, add one additional hour. If the result is earlier than 00:00, add 24 hours and subtract 1 from the day; if it is 24:00 or later, subtract 24 hours and add 1 to the day. Historical time zone data obtained from the IANA time zone database.)	Location (Note: Rough place name and a latitude/longitude reference; for rocket-carried tests, the launch location is specified before the detonation location, if known. Some locations are extremely accurate; others (like airdrops and space blasts) may be quite inaccurate. "~" indicates a likely pro-forma rough location, shared with other tests in that same area.)	Elevation + height (Note: Elevation is the ground level at the point directly below the explosion relative to sea level; height is the additional distance added or subtracted by tower, balloon, shaft, tunnel, air drop or other contrivance. For rocket bursts the ground level is "N/A". In some cases it is not clear if the height is absolute or relative to ground, for example, Plumbbob/John. No number or units indicates the value is unknown, while "0" means zero. Sorting on this column is by elevation and height added together.)	Delivery (Note: Atmospheric, airdrop, balloon, gun, cruise missile, rocket, surface, tower, and barge are all disallowed by the Partial Nuclear Test Ban Treaty. Sealed shaft and tunnel are underground, and remained useful under the PTBT. Intentional cratering tests are borderline; they occurred under the treaty, were sometimes protested, and generally overlooked if the test was declared to be a peaceful use.) Purpose (Note: Include weapons development, weapon effects, safety test, transport safety test, war, science, joint verification and industrial/peaceful, which may be further broken down.)	Device (Note: Designations for test items where known, "?" indicates some uncertainty about the preceding value, nicknames for particular devices in quotes. This category of information is often not officially disclosed.)	Yield (Note: Estimated energy yield in tons, kilotons, and megatons. A ton of TNT equivalent is defined as 4.184 gigajoules (1 gigacalorie).)	References Notes
Yucca	April 28, 1958 02:40 UTC	edst (12 hrs)	Pacific Proving Grounds 12.617°N 167.025°E	26.21 km (16.29 mi)	Balloon; Weapon effect	W-25	1.7 kt (7.1 TJ)	ABM development - part of Operation Newsreel (high-altitude tests). Fired "about 85 nmi (157 km; 98 mi) northwest of Bikini".
Cactus	May 5, 1958 18:15 UTC	MHT (11 hrs)	Runit (Yvonne), Enewetak Atoll 11.55255°N 162.34727°E	1 m (3 ft 3 in)	Dry surface; Weapons development	Mk-43 primary	18 kt (75 TJ)	LASL test of a MK-43 primary in a thermonuclear system mockup. Similar to Elder. 596 ft (182 m) crater southwest of the Redwing Lacrosse crater; crater later became the Cactus Dome.
Fir	May 11, 1958 17:50 UTC	MHT (11 hrs)	Namu (Charlie), Bikini Atoll 11.6908°N 165.2733°E	3 m (9.8 ft)	Barge; Weapons development		1.4 Mt (5.9 PJ)	Clean 2-stage TN device, only 90 kilotons of TNT (380 TJ) fission, 93.4% fusion yield.
Butternut	May 11, 1958 18:15 UTC	MHT (11 hrs)	Runit (Yvonne), Enewetak Atoll 11.53859°N 162.34367°E	3 m (9.8 ft)	Barge; Weapons development	TX-46 primary ?	81 kt (340 TJ)	TX-46 primary test, similar to Oak and Yellowwood.
Koa	May 12, 1958 18:30 UTC	MHT (11 hrs)	Teiter (Gene), Enewetak Atoll 11.66997°N 162.19847°E	0.81 m (2 ft 8 in)	Dry surface; Weapons development	XW-35	1.4 Mt (5.9 PJ)	XW-35 ICBM warhead test.
Wahoo	May 16, 1958 01:30 UTC	MHT (11 hrs)	Pokon (Irvin), Enewetak Atoll 11.32646°N 162.16309°E	−150 m (−490 ft)	underwater; Weapon effect	Mk-7	9 kt (38 TJ)	Mk-7 deep underwater explosion effects, water depth 3,200 ft (980 m).
Holly	May 20, 1958 18:30 UTC	MHT (11 hrs)	Runit (Yvonne), Enewetak Atoll 11.54029°N 162.35039°E	4 m (13 ft)	Barge; Weapons development	XW-31Y3	5.9 kt (25 TJ)	XW-31Y3 proof test.
Nutmeg	May 21, 1958 21:20 UTC	MHT (11 hrs)	Eninmen (Tare), Bikini Atoll 11.50355°N 165.3722°E	3 m (9.8 ft)	Barge; Weapons development	early XW-47 ?	25.1 kt (105 TJ)	2 stage thermonuclear device, possible W47.
Yellowwood	May 26, 1958 02:00 UTC	MHT (11 hrs)	Enjebi (Janet), Enewetak Atoll 11.65751°N 162.22168°E	3 m (9.8 ft)	Barge; Weapons development	TX-46, became W-53	330 kt (1,400 TJ)	LASL developmental test of a "clean" TX-46 warhead design. Fizzled, low burn in secondary. Retry in Oak.
Magnolia	May 26, 1958 18:00 UTC	MHT (11 hrs)	Runit (Yvonne), Enewetak Atoll 11.53932°N 162.34841°E	4 m (13 ft)	Barge; Weapons development	"Cougar"	57 kt (240 TJ)	Proof test.
Tobacco	May 30, 1958 02:15 UTC	MHT (11 hrs)	Enjebi (Janet), Enewetak Atoll 11.66056°N 162.22663°E	2.7 m (8 ft 10 in)	Barge; Weapons development	XW-50	11.6 kt (49 TJ)	Exploratory shot, XW-50 Nike-Zeus prototype, 2nd stage failed to ignite.
Sycamore	May 31, 1958 03:00 UTC	MHT (11 hrs)	Namu (Charlie), Bikini Atoll 11.69722°N 165.27486°E	3 m (9.8 ft)	Barge; Weapons development	TX-41	92 kt (380 TJ)	"Clean" TX-41 fizzle; predicted yield 5 Mt (21 PJ) total, 200 kt (840 TJ) fission; low level burning in 2nd stage; similar to Poplar and Pine.
Rose	June 2, 1958 18:45 UTC	MHT (11 hrs)	Runit (Yvonne), Enewetak Atoll 11.53926°N 162.34593°E	4.5 m (15 ft)	Barge; Weapons development	XW-49 ? Primary	15 kt (63 TJ)	Exploratory shot, possible XW-49, 80 kt fusion expected, 2nd stage failed to ignite.
Umbrella	June 8, 1958 23:15 UTC	MHT (11 hrs)	Pokon (Irvin), Enewetak Atoll 11.37498°N 162.19399°E	−50 m (−160 ft)	underwater; Weapon effect	Mk-7	8 kt (33 TJ)	Shallow underwater explosion on lagoon bottom at 150 ft (46 m). Crater 915 m × 6 m (3,002 ft × 20 ft).
Maple	June 10, 1958 17:30 UTC	MHT (11 hrs)	Yurochi aka Irioj (Dog), Bikini Atoll 11.6915°N 165.41582°E	3 m (9.8 ft)	Barge; Weapons development		213 kt (890 TJ)	"Dirty" 2-stage test, predicted to be 89% fission.
Aspen	June 14, 1958 17:30 UTC	MHT (11 hrs)	Namu (Charlie), Bikini Atoll 11.6908°N 165.2733°E	3 m (9.8 ft)	Barge; Weapons development	XW-47 ?	319 kt (1,330 TJ)	Possible XW-47 prototype, 2 stage.
Walnut	June 14, 1958 18:30 UTC	MHT (11 hrs)	Enjebi (Janet), Enewetak Atoll 11.65751°N 162.22168°E	2 m (6 ft 7 in)	Barge; Weapons development		1.5 Mt (6.3 PJ)	Thermonuclear prototype development test.
Linden	June 18, 1958 03:00 UTC	MHT (11 hrs)	Runit (Yvonne), Enewetak Atoll 11.54061°N 162.35106°E	2.5 m (8 ft 2 in)	Barge; Weapons development	XW-50 primary ?	11 kt (46 TJ)	Possible XW-50 primary.
Redwood	June 27, 1958 17:30 UTC	MHT (11 hrs)	Yurochi aka Irioj (Dog), Bikini Atoll 11.6915°N 165.41582°E	3 m (9.8 ft)	Barge; Weapons development	XW-47 ?	412 kt (1,720 TJ)	Possible XW-47 prototype, 2-stage, 250 kt (1,000 TJ) fission yield expected; similar to Aspen, Nutmeg, Dogwood devices.
Elder	June 27, 1958 18:30 UTC	MHT (11 hrs)	Enjebi (Janet), Enewetak Atoll 11.66056°N 162.22663°E	2.7 m (8 ft 10 in)	Barge; Weapons development	TX-43	880 kt (3,700 TJ)	TX-43 laydown bomb test, 50% fission yield expected, similar to Cactus.
Oak	June 28, 1958 19:30 UTC	MHT (11 hrs)	Bogallua (Alice), Enewetak Atoll 11.60309°N 162.10259°E	1.8 m (5 ft 11 in)	Barge; Weapons development	TX-46/53	8.9 Mt (37 PJ)	Prototype test of the LASL designed TX-46 system. Similar to Butternut and Yellowwood. Crater 1,750 m × 80 m (5,740 ft × 260 ft).
Hickory	June 29, 1958 00:00 UTC	MHT (11 hrs)	Eninmen (Tare), Bikini Atoll 11.4961°N 162.3708°E	3 m (9.8 ft)	Barge; Weapons development	XW-47 primary ?	14 kt (59 TJ)	Possible XW-47 primary test, similar to Hardtack II Neptune and Titania.
Sequoia	July 1, 1958 18:30 UTC	MHT (11 hrs)	Runit (Yvonne), Enewetak Atoll 11.54061°N 162.35106°E	2 m (6 ft 7 in)	Barge; Weapons development	XW-50 primary ?	5.2 kt (22 TJ)	Similar to Hardtack II Otero, test of Hardtack I Pisonia primary.
Cedar	July 2, 1958 17:30 UTC	MHT (11 hrs)	Namu (Charlie), Bikini Atoll 11.69722°N 165.27486°E	3.4 m (11 ft)	Barge; Weapons development		220 kt (920 TJ)	2-stage "clean" thermonuclear device, predicted fission yield 30 kt (130 TJ).
Dogwood	July 5, 1958 18:30 UTC	MHT (11 hrs)	Enjebi (Janet), Enewetak Atoll 11.66056°N 162.22663°E	3 m (9.8 ft)	Barge; Weapons development	XW-47 ? Piccolo	397 kt (1,660 TJ)	Similar to Redwood, Aspen, Nutmeg; possible XW-47 prototype, Piccolo 2nd stage.
Poplar	July 12, 1958 03:30 UTC	MHT (11 hrs)	Namu (Charlie), Bikini Atoll 11.69704°N 165.26708°E	3 m (9.8 ft)	Barge; Weapons development	TX-41	9.3 Mt (39 PJ)	TX-41 "clean" 2-stage variant; similar to Pine and Sycamore; largest of Hardtack I, and 5th largest U.S. test ever.
Scaevola	July 14, 1958 04:00 UTC	MHT (11 hrs)	Runit (Yvonne), Enewetak Atoll 11.54662°N 162.35199°E	6 m (20 ft)	Barge; Safety experiment	XW-34	0 tons of TNT (0 GJ)	XW-34 1-point safety test, successful.
Pisonia	July 17, 1958 23:00 UTC	MHT (11 hrs)	Runit (Yvonne), Enewetak Atoll 11.55°N 162.31°E	2 m (6 ft 7 in)	Barge; Weapons development	XW-50 ? TN, sequoiah pr	255 kt (1,070 TJ)	Probable prototype XW-50 thermonuclear design, modified Tobacco device, used Sequoia primary.
Juniper	July 22, 1958 04:20 UTC	MHT (11 hrs)	Eninmen (Tare), Bikini Atoll 11.50355°N 165.3722°E	3 m (9.8 ft)	Barge; Weapons development	XW-47	65 kt (270 TJ)	"Most radical UCRL shot", "entirely new concept", last Bikini atmospheric shot, probable XW-47 candidate.
Olive	July 22, 1958 20:30 UTC	MHT (11 hrs)	Enjebi (Janet), Enewetak Atoll 11.66056°N 162.22663°E	3 m (9.8 ft)	Barge; Weapons development		202 kt (850 TJ)	Concept feasibility test, 2-stage thermonuclear device, established high yield/light weight; weight 100 kg (220 lb) (yield/weight ratio 2 kt/kg (3.8 TJ/lb) 2 kt/kg).
Pine	July 26, 1958 20:30 UTC	MHT (11 hrs)	Enjebi (Janet), Enewetak Atoll 11.6513°N 162.21414°E	3 m (9.8 ft)	Barge; Weapons development	Mk-41	2 Mt (8.4 PJ)	TX-41 "clean" 3-stage variant; similar to Poplar and Sycamore.
Piñon (canceled)	August 1958	edst (12 hrs)	Pacific Proving Grounds 12°N 162°E	3 m (9.8 ft)	Air drop; Weapon effect		unknown	A proposed international demonstration of a clean thermonuke. Cancelled by President Eisenhower in the runup to the 1958 test moratorium.
Teak	August 1, 1958 10:50 UTC	jamt (–11 hrs); Believed in use during Dominic, Fishbowl, HT I.	Launch from Johnston Island, Johnston Atoll 16.73365°N 169.52534°W, elv: 3 + 0 m (9.8 + 0.0 ft); Detonation over Johnston Island, Johnston Atoll 16.7439°N 169.5333°W	81.3 km (50.5 mi)	High-alt rocket 30–80 kilometres (98,000–262,000 feet); Weapon effect	W-39	3.8 Mt (16 PJ)	ABM effects test. Miscalculation resulted in detonation directly above launch site. Part of Operation Newsreel (high-altitude tests), carried on a Redstone rocket.
Quince	August 6, 1958 02:15 UTC	MHT (11 hrs)	Runit (Yvonne), Enewetak Atoll 11.54828°N 162.35079°E	1 m (3 ft 3 in)	Dry surface; Weapons development	XW-51 ?	no yield	Probable XW-51 test, fizzle.
Orange	August 12, 1958 10:30 UTC	jamt (–11 hrs); Believed in use during Dominic, Fishbowl, HT I. |	Launch from Johnston Island, Johnston Atoll 16.73365°N 169.52534°W, elv: 3 + 0 m (9.8 + 0.0 ft); Detonation over Johnston Island, Johnston Atoll 16.3583°N 169.5356°W	45.5 km (28.3 mi)	High-alt rocket 30–80 kilometres (98,000–262,000 feet); Weapon effect	W-39	3.8 Mt (16 PJ)	ABM effects test, W-39 warhead, part of Operation Newsreel (high-altitude tests), carried on a Redstone rocket.
Fig	August 18, 1958 04:00 UTC	MHT (11 hrs)	Runit (Yvonne), Enewetak Atoll 11.54955°N 162.34879°E	0.5 m (1 ft 8 in)	Dry surface; Weapons development	XW-51 ?	20 tons of TNT (84 GJ)	Probable XW-51 test, similar to Quince, successful, last atmospheric shot at Enewetak.
