= W50 (nuclear warhead) =

W50 nuclear warhead
- Silhouette of the W50 warhead.
- Type: Nuclear weapon
- Place of origin: United States

Production history
- Designer: Los Alamos National Laboratory
- Designed: 1958-1962
- Produced: March 1963 to December 1965
- No. built: 280
- Variants: 3

Specifications
- Mass: 412 lb (187 kg)
- Length: 44 inches (110 cm)
- Diameter: 14 in (36 cm) (excluding mounting flange)
- Blast yield: 60 or 200 or 400 kilotonnes of TNT (250 or 840 or 1,670 TJ)

The W50 (also known as the Mark 50) was an American thermonuclear warhead deployed on the MGM-31 Pershing theater ballistic missile. Initially developed for the LIM-49 Nike Zeus anti-ballistic missile, this application was cancelled before deployment. The W50 was developed by Los Alamos National Laboratory. The W50 was manufactured from 1963 through 1965, with a total of 280 being produced. They were retired from service starting in 1973 with the last units retired in 1991.

There were two major variants produced: the Mod 0 for Nike Zeus and the Mod 1 for Pershing. Three yield options were available: the Y1 with 60 kilotonnes of TNT (250 TJ), Y2 with 200 kilotonnes of TNT (840 TJ), and Y3 with 400 kilotonnes of TNT (1,700 TJ). All variants were 15.4 inches (0.39 m) in diameter at the attachment flange and 44 inches (1.1 m) long, weighing 410 pounds (190 kg).

== History ==
The W50 warhead traces its origins to a 1955 proposal that became the Nike Zeus missile. Bell Telephone Laboratories were tasked with evaluating future air defense problems in the 1960 to 1970 time frame, which led to the Nike Zeus proposal. This study showed that a nuclear warhead was mandatory to defeat threats such as Intercontinental ballistic missiles (ICBMs) moving at 24,000 feet per second (7,300 m/s), and that even with a 50-kilotonne-of-TNT (210 TJ) warhead, the maximum possible kill distance to a target was still quite low.

The assistant secretary of defense was anxious to establish an early anti-ballistic missile capability and requested that the Atomic Energy Commission (AEC - now the Department of Energy) work with the army on a feasibility study of suitable nuclear warheads for Nike Zeus. This group first met in June 1957. The missile was expected to be able to carry a warhead of about 300 pounds (140 kg) weight.

Due to the complexity of the task, the study group split the work into two phases. In the first phase, mechanisms which would kill enemy warheads were examined, as would the lethal radii for those mechanisms for various yields. It was believed that these values could not be adequately defined for another two years as tests of target vulnerability and the practical limits of warhead hardening needed to be performed. This included the requirement to perform many flight tests to establish reentry vehicle (RV) vulnerability. The earliest operational availability date was expected to be 1962.

In the second phase, a warhead designed to meet the requirements determined in phase one would be developed. It was believed that specific warhead requirements should not be tied down as advantage should be taken of design improvements made over the following two years. The proposal to delay detailed warhead design until 1959 was accepted in late June 1957.

Concurrently, interest in the proposed Pershing missile had increased and in January 1958, a meeting was held to discuss a nuclear warhead for the system. Operational availability was planned for July 1962 with flight tests starting in August 1960. Both Los Alamos and Lawrence Radiation Laboratory (now Lawrence Livermore National Laboratory) stated that warheads in the weight and yield requirements were possible on the given timescales. A feasibility study of the Pershing warhead was released in February 1958.

The division of military application (DMA) expressed concern in February 1958 about the number of weapons programs that Livermore were working on with planned operational availabilities in the 1960 to 1962 time frame. They were concerned about Livermore's workload, specifically with planned acceleration and increased prioritization of the W47 warhead for Polaris, and therefore believed that the Nike Zeus warhead should be assigned to Los Alamos. Formal authorization to develop a warhead for Nike Zeus was received on 3 March 1958.

In March 1958, another application for the warhead was proposed on the Minuteman missile. Warheads of 300 pounds (140 kg) and 550 pounds (250 kg) were planned, and expected operational availability was mid-1962. In May 1958 a Minuteman warhead study was completed with use of the same warhead as Nike Zeus suggested. Meanwhile for Pershing, two warheads of 300 pounds (140 kg) and 600 pounds (270 kg) were considered. For the 300-pound (140 kg) design, a diameter of 15 inches (380 mm) and a length of 40 inches (1,000 mm) was proposed and for the heavier warhead design, a diameter of 18 inches (460 mm) and a length of 50 inches (1,300 mm) was proposed.

In June 1958, the DMA then suggested that a single warhead be developed for Nike Zeus, Minuteman, Pershing and Hopi (a short lived air-to-surface missile proposal). This suggestion was accepted. The proposed specifications for this "universal warhead" were a diameter of 12 to 14 inches (300 to 360 mm), a length of 38 to 44 inches (970 to 1,120 mm) and a weight of 350 pounds (160 kg).

During 1958, candidate nuclear warhead designs were tested by Los Alamos during Operation Hardtack I. These included the shots Tobacco (30 May 1958, 11.6 kilotonnes of TNT (49 TJ)), Sequoia (1 July 1958, 5.2 kilotonnes of TNT (22 TJ)) and Pisonia (17 July 1958, 255 kilotonnes of TNT (1,070 TJ)). Tests of missile components against the effects of nuclear explosions were conducted in the shot Cactus (5 May 1958, 18 kilotonnes of TNT (75 TJ)). As devices directly applicable to Pershing were being tested in Hardtack, it was decided that release of a study of two warheads being considered would be deferred until after the tests.

The military characteristics for the Nike Zeus warhead were released in July 1958. The warhead was to be rugged, reliable and simple in design; be easy to test, inspect, store and handle; be designed to minimize the possibility of human error; and require a minimum of operational testing and maintenance. The warhead would be capable of remaining in alert condition, while loaded into an alert missile, for a period of a least four years, while being ready to fire in fifteen seconds.

In August 1958, Sandia were asked if a warhead meeting all four system requirements could be furnished with an operational availability date of late 1961. Sandia were responsible for design of the electrical systems in the Nike Zeus warhead, which was now assigned the name XW-50. This application required extreme miniaturization of components due to space limitations inside Nike Zeus and a parallel design using explosively actuated devices was initiated. In September, Sandia reported that the warheads electrical system would be similar to that of the W47 Polaris warhead and W49 warhead used on several ICBMs.

In October 1958, Los Alamos and Sandia wrote to the Albuquerque Operations Office stating that a warhead for all four systems was possible. In the Pershing role, the now 650-pound (290 kg) heavy warhead would be provided by a rework of the W47 warhead while the 350-pound (160 kg) warhead would be provided by the XW-50. In December 1958, it was felt that Nike Zeus could accept a warhead up to 400 pounds (180 kg) and it was suggested that the warhead weight be increased. Subsequently, the air force decided to examine other warheads for Minuteman such as the W56, and the Hopi application was dropped.

In mid-June 1959, the nuclear design of the XW-50 was reviewed, and in late-June, the AEC was authorized to proceed with development of a nuclear warhead for Pershing. For the Pershing role, it was believed that no further nuclear tests would be required for the XW-50 and that the warhead would be available January 1963.

Meanwhile, Sandia were working on firing devices. Nike Zeus required air burst fuzing and the capability to self destruct, while Pershing required air and ground burst fuzing with contact preclusion for air burst, but no self-destruct. For Pershing, contact fuzing would be provided by contact crystals and a double-shell system. The military characteristics were released in September 1959 and included that the device be one-point safe; possess maximum protection against detonation by accident, saboteurs or "psychotics"; and would include an environmental safing device. The warhead would also contain no internal power source capable of arming the warhead or charging the firing set.

In August 1960 a new warhead design was underway: the XW-50-X1, and in September field command notified Sandia that the designs of the XW-50 and XW-50-X1 were acceptable, despite a slight increase in diameter and an increase in length to 45 inches (1,100 mm).

Production of the XW-50-X1 warhead was authorized in June 1961. It was 14 inches (360 mm) in diameter and 15 3/8 inches (390 mm) in diameter at the mounting flange, 44 inches (1,100 mm) long and weighed 412 pounds (187 kg).

In July 1962, Sandia concluded a study on incorporating a permissive action link (PAL) system into the warhead for Pershing use. Because of the limited space available, fitting a PAL required removal of the self-destruct system. Because of this it was decided that two different warhead mods would be provided in service: the W50 Mod 0 for Nike Zeus and the W50 Mod 1 for Pershing. However, no production of the W50-0 was authorized as the Nike Zeus was cancelled.

Due to the need to divert firing sets for the approaching test series, production of the W50-1 was delayed until March 1963. Weapons development tests of the XW-50-X1 in Operation Dominic included Adobe (25 April 1962, 190 kilotonnes of TNT (790 TJ)) and Aztec (27 April 192, 410 kilotonnes of TNT (1,700 TJ)). The warhead was also used in several weapons effects test in Operation Fishbowl, including Checkmate (20 October 1962, 10 kilotonnes of TNT (42 TJ)), Bluegill Triple Prime (26 October 1962, 200 kilotonnes of TNT (840 TJ)) and Kingfish (1 November 1962, 200 kilotonnes of TNT (840 TJ)).

Early production was achieved in March 1963. The final warhead was slightly overweight, but this was considered acceptable by the department of defense. Production continued until December 1965, with 280 warheads produced. At some point a W50 Mod 2 warhead was developed. W50-1 warheads were retired starting in April 1973 with the last W50-1 warheads removed from service in 1978. The last W50-2 warheads were retired in April 1991.

== Design ==
The W50 was a two-stage, gas boosted, externally initiated design. The warhead was body 14 inches (360 mm) in diameter and 15 3/8 inches (390 mm) in diameter at the mounting flange, 44 inches (1,100 mm) long and weighed 412 pounds (187 kg). The mounting flange was aluminium and shrunk-fit over the steel warhead case. The boosting gas bottle was mounted outside the pressure cover to enable replacement without breaking the warhead seal. The warhead electrical system contained two neutron generators.

Three yield variants were produced, known as the W50Y1, W50Y2 and W50Y3, with yields of 60, 200 and 400 kilotonnes of TNT (250, 840 and 1,670 TJ) respectively. The W50Y1 and W50Y3 are sometimes given as having yields of 40 and 440 kilotonnes of TNT (170 and 1,840 TJ) respectively. The 200-kilotonne-of-TNT (840 TJ) version of the warhead was for Nike Zeus, but was in use on Pershing 1a by 1991.

The W50 lacked enhanced detonation safety systems and insensitive high explosives, and featured a Category A PAL for use control.

The XW-50-X1 warhead tested in Dominic Aztec used a spherical secondary stage, which in a 1962 document is described as:

This weapon was originally designed with a [redacted] to relate more closely to a tested device, but a decision was made to go to a more efficient spherical secondary. The effect of these departures should be experimentally verified. There is no substitute warhead available in this weight class.

— Proposed Atmospheric Test Program (1962)

After launch, an inertial fuze received power from the Pershing second stage. This initiated a set of batteries prior to second stage separation. If the missile was on course and if the second stage separation occurred within 300 milliseconds of engine cutoff, the ignition circuit on a set of thermal batteries was enabled. The thermal battery was fired just prior to reentry, and when a deceleration of 0.5 g (4.9 m/s^{2}) was sensed, the fuze was enabled and warhead arming functions took place.

According to researcher Chuck Hansen, the W50's secondary stage was also used in the W78 Minuteman III warhead. The W78 is estimated to have a yield of 335 to 350 kilotonnes of TNT (1,400 to 1,460 TJ) and remains in the US nuclear stockpile.
