= Hopi (missile) =

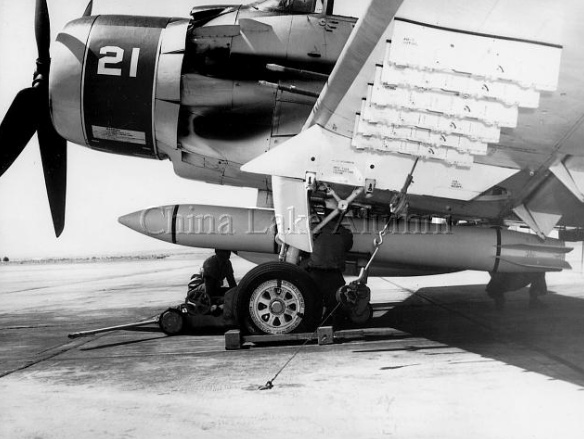
- Hopi mounted on an AD-5N Skyraider
- Type: Air-to-surface missile
- Place of origin: United States

Service history
- Used by: United States Navy

Production history
- Designed: Mid-to-late 1950s
- Manufacturer: Naval Ordnance Test Station

Specifications
- Warhead: W50 thermonuclear
- Blast yield: 60 to 400 kilotonnes of TNT (250 to 1,670 TJ)
- Engine: Solid-fuel rocket

The Hopi was an air-to-surface missile developed by the United States Navy's Naval Ordnance Test Station. Intended to provide a medium-range nuclear capability for carrier aircraft, the missile reached the flight test stage during 1958, but the project was cancelled following testing and no production was undertaken.

== Design and development ==
Developed by the Naval Ordnance Test Station (NOTS) at China Lake, California during the mid-to-late 1950s, the Hopi missile was an improved development of the earlier BOAR (Bombardment Aircraft Rocket). BOAR had been developed at China Lake as an unguided, nuclear-armed rocket for use by carrier-based aircraft, seeing limited service in the fleet between 1957 and 1963.

In its essentials simply an enlarged version of BOAR, which it was intended to replace in service, Hopi was designed as a medium-range weapon capable of being carried by a wide variety of carrier-based fighter and attack aircraft. The rocket-powered missile was capable of being fitted with a W50 nuclear warhead capable of producing a yield between 60 and 400 kilotons; however, no details of the planned guidance system for the missile, or if there even was intended to be guidance at all, have survived.

== Operational history ==
Following its development, the Hopi missile was flight-tested on the China Lake weapons range during 1958. The missile was test-fired from a variety of aircraft, including the North American FJ-4 Fury, Douglas AD Skyraider, Douglas A3D Skywarrior and Douglas A4D Skyhawk. However, no details of the tests are known to have survived, and the Hopi project was cancelled shortly thereafter.
