= Ramo language =

Ramo language can refer to:

- Bokar language of China and India
- Uni language of Papua New Guinea (spoken in Ramo village)

== See also ==
- Ramo (disambiguation)
