= XW-35 =

American nuclear warhead

The XW-35 was designed from the outset as a thermonuclear warhead for the first generation of ICBMs. Development was driven by the development of the Atlas missile, and when the accuracy of the Atlas was shown to be inferior to predictions the XW-35 design had to be altered to give a higher yield. By March 1958, the development of the XW-35-X1 was lagging. The XW-35-X1 was probably the device tested in the Koa shot of the Operation Hardtack I series (May 1958). Predicted yield was 1.75 megatons; the actual yield was 1.37 megatons with the shortfall due to poor burning of the secondary. By this time the Air Force had designated the XW-49, a simple modification of the TX-28 already successfully tested during the Redwing series. By August 1958 the first dedicated missile warhead design, the W-35, had been cancelled in favor of the W-49.
