= Ramo (name) =

Ramo is a surname of Italian origin. The given name Ramo is also a shortened form of the name Ramadan, commonly used among Muslim communities in Bosnia and Herzegovina.

Notable people with the name include:

== Surname ==
- Beatriz Ramo (born 1979), Spanish architect
- José del Ramo Núñez (born 1960), Spanish cyclist
- Joshua Cooper Ramo (born 1968), American businessperson
- Roberta Cooper Ramo, American lawyer
- Simon Ramo (1913–2016), American physicist and engineer

== Given name ==
- Ramo Isak (1973-), Federal Minister of the Interior of the Federation of Bosnia and Herzegovina, one of the two entities of the country
- Ramo Kolenović (1927–2015), Montenegrin kayaker
- Ramo Stott (1934–2021), American race car driver
- Abdullah Ramo Pazara (birth date unknown–2014), Bosnian-American member of the ISIS
- Ziggy Ramo, Australian singer
