= Rämö (surname) =

Rämö is a Finnish surname. Notable people with the surname include:

- Juuso Rämö (born 1994), Finnish professional ice hockey player
- Karri Rämö (born 1986), Finnish professional ice hockey goaltender
- Mikko Rämö (born 1980), Finnish professional ice hockey goaltender
