= Mark 7 nuclear bomb =

Mark 7
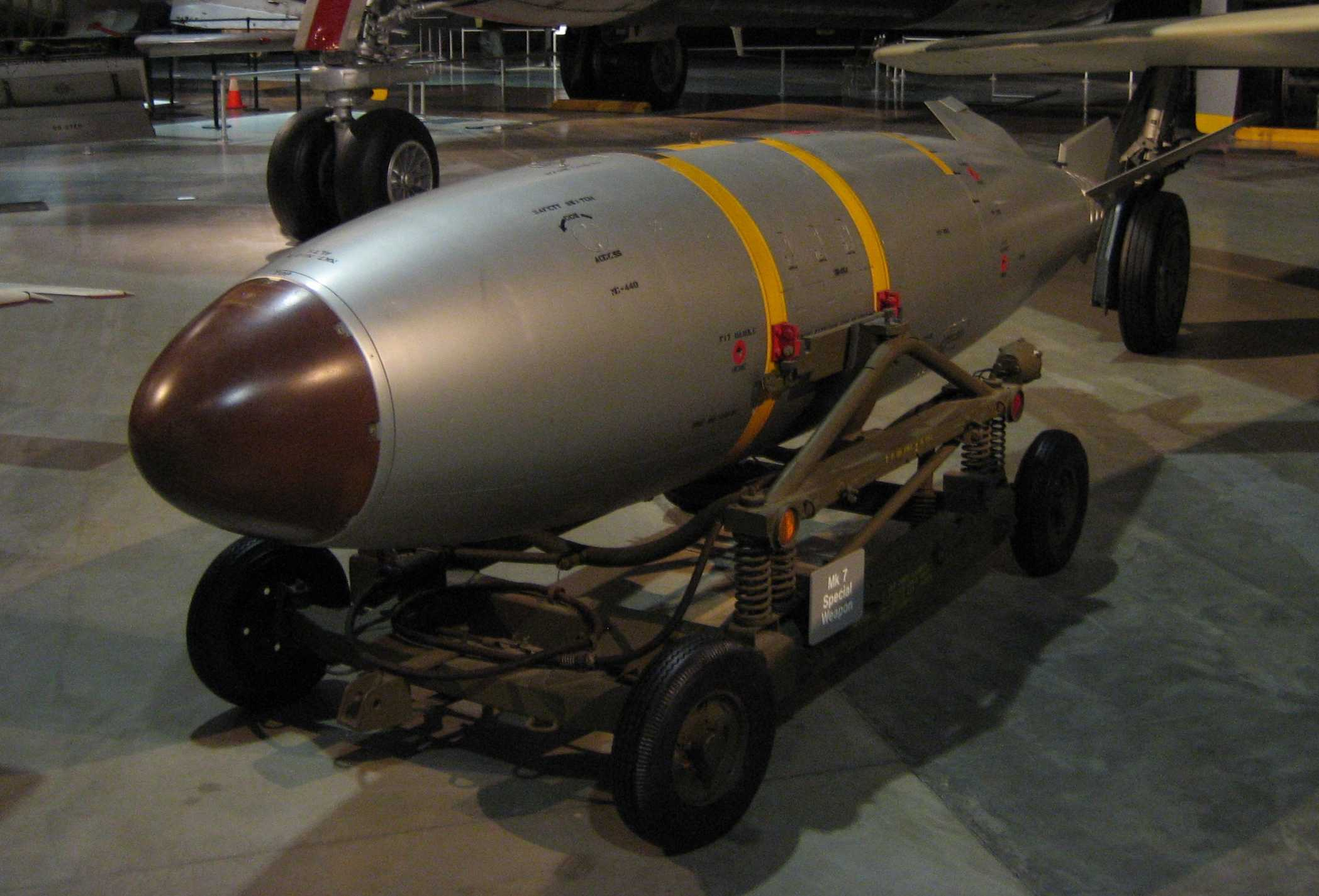
- Mark 7 nuclear bomb at USAF Museum
- Type: Nuclear bomb

Service history
- Used by: United States

Production history
- Produced: July 1952 to February 1963
- No. built: 3,050 to 3,150 weapons produced in all variants.
- Variants: 10

Specifications
- Mass: 1,600 pounds (730 kg)
- Length: 15 feet 2 inches (4.62 m)
- Diameter: 30 inches (76 cm)
- Blast yield: 8, 19, 22, 30, 31, and 61 kt by using different weapon pits.

Mark 7 "Thor" (or Mk-7) was the first tactical fission bomb adopted by US armed forces. It was also the first weapon to be delivered via toss bombing with the help of the low-altitude bombing system (LABS). The weapon was tested in Operation Buster-Jangle. The Mark 7 was fitted with retractable stabilizer fins so it could be carried under fighter-bomber aircraft. The Mark 7 warhead (W7) also formed the basis of the 30.5 inches (775 mm) BOAR rocket, the Mark 90 Betty nuclear depth charge, MGR-1 Honest John rocket, MGM-5 Corporal ballistic missile, and Nike Ajax surface-to-air missile. It was also supplied for delivery by Royal Air Force Canberra aircraft assigned to NATO in Germany under the command of SACEUR. This was done under the auspices of Project E, an agreement between the United States and the UK on the RAF carriage of US nuclear weapons. In UK use it was designated 1,650 lb. H.E. M.C. The Mark 7 was in service from 1952 to 1967(8) with 1,700–1,800 having been built.

== Design ==
Diagram of implosion system like that used in the Mk7

The Mark 7 was a variable-yield fission weapon that used a levitated pit and an implosion design with 92 high-explosive lenses. The weapon had multiple yields of 8, 19, 22, 30, 31, and 61 kt by using various weapon pits. The weapon had airburst and contact fuzing modes. The weapon used an automatic in-flight insertion system for safing and later versions of the weapon used a PAL A type arming and safing system. About 1,700 to 1,800 Mark 7 bombs and 1,350 W7 warheads were produced.

The Mark 7 nuclear weapon weighed about 1,600 pounds (730 kg). It was fitted with one vertical retractable stabilizer fin that allowed it to fit better in or under some planes. This was unique, and made it one of the first nuclear weapons to be streamlined enough to be carried on smaller planes. The bomb’s diameter is 30 inches (760 mm).

== Delivery system ==
There were 10 models of this warhead produced for several delivery systems. Beside the Mark 7 bomb, this included the BOAR air-to-surface rocket, the MGR-1 Honest John and MGM-5 Corporal tactical surface-to-surface missiles, the Betty Mark 90 depth bomb, the MIM-14 Nike Hercules surface-to-air missile, and an atomic demolition munition.

Configured as a Mark 7 gravity bomb and as the BOAR, the weapon was carried by the F-84 Thunderjet, F-100 Super Sabre, and F-101 Voodoo fighter-bombers; and the B-57 Canberra bomber.

== Tests ==
During Operation Teapot MET on 15 April 1955, a test was conducted using a Mk7 warhead using an experimental composite plutonium/uranium-233 pit, producing a 22kt yield, 33% lower than expected. As Shot MET was a military effects test the lower yield ruined many of the experiments being conducted by the DoD during the test. The DoD had not been informed of the substitution by Los Alamos.

== T2 Atomic Demolition Munition ==
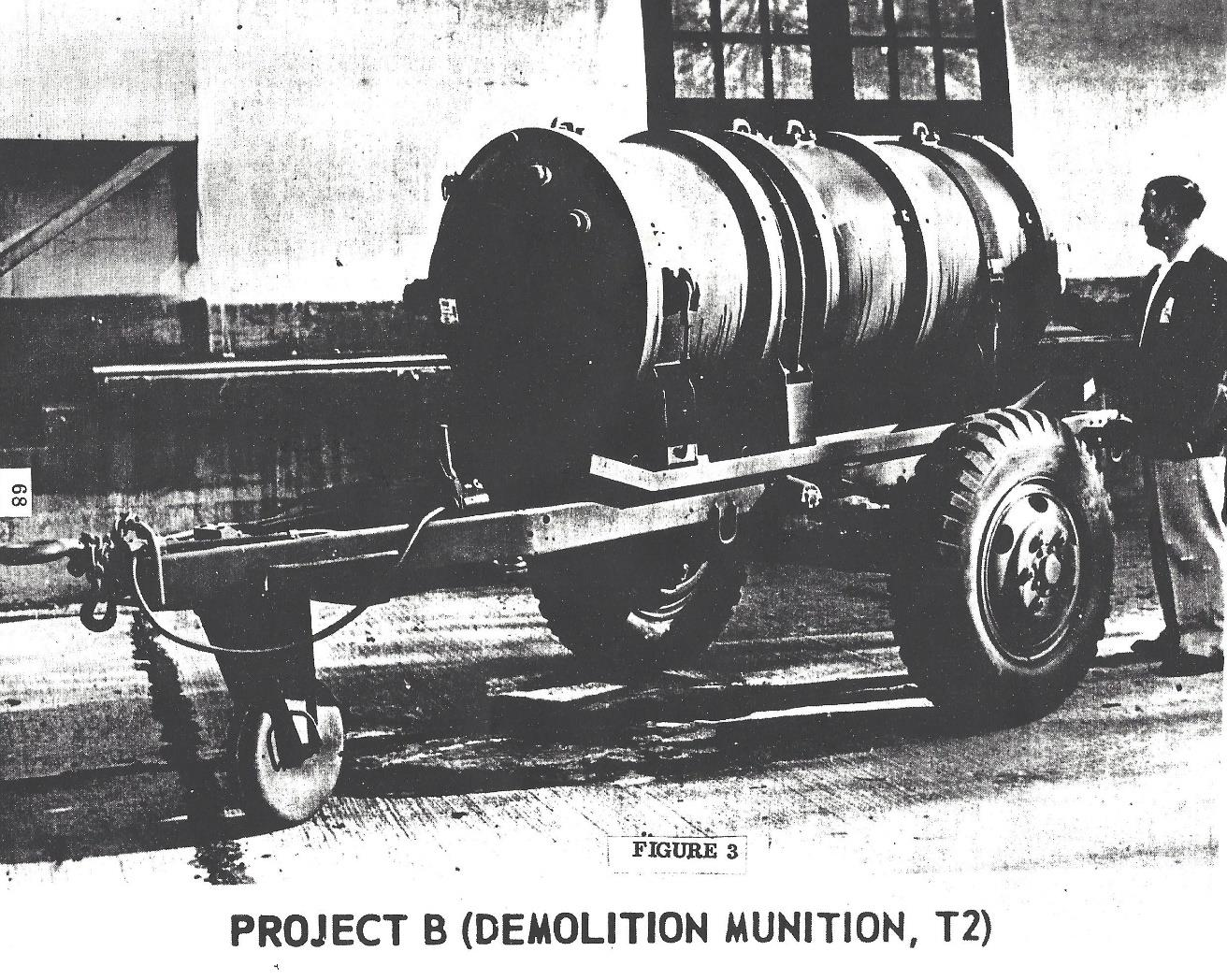
T2 Atomic Demolition Munition

An Atomic Demolition Munition (ADM) called the T2 was considered starting in February 1953. Some work on the project was completed but the device was cancelled before production. The system was to have both command and timer detonation options.

== Survivors ==
A Mark 7 casing is on display in the Cold War hangar at the National Museum of the United States Air Force in Dayton, Ohio, and one is on display at Wings over the Rockies Museum, Denver, Colorado.

== Specifications ==
- Length: 15.2 feet (4.6 m)
- Diameter: 2.5 feet (0.76 m)
- Weight: 1,680 pounds (762 kg)
- Fuzing: airburst or contact
- Yield: Yield could be varied between 8 and 61 kilotonnes of TNT (33 and 255 TJ) by using different weapon pits (cores).
- Implosion nuclear weapon

== Users ==
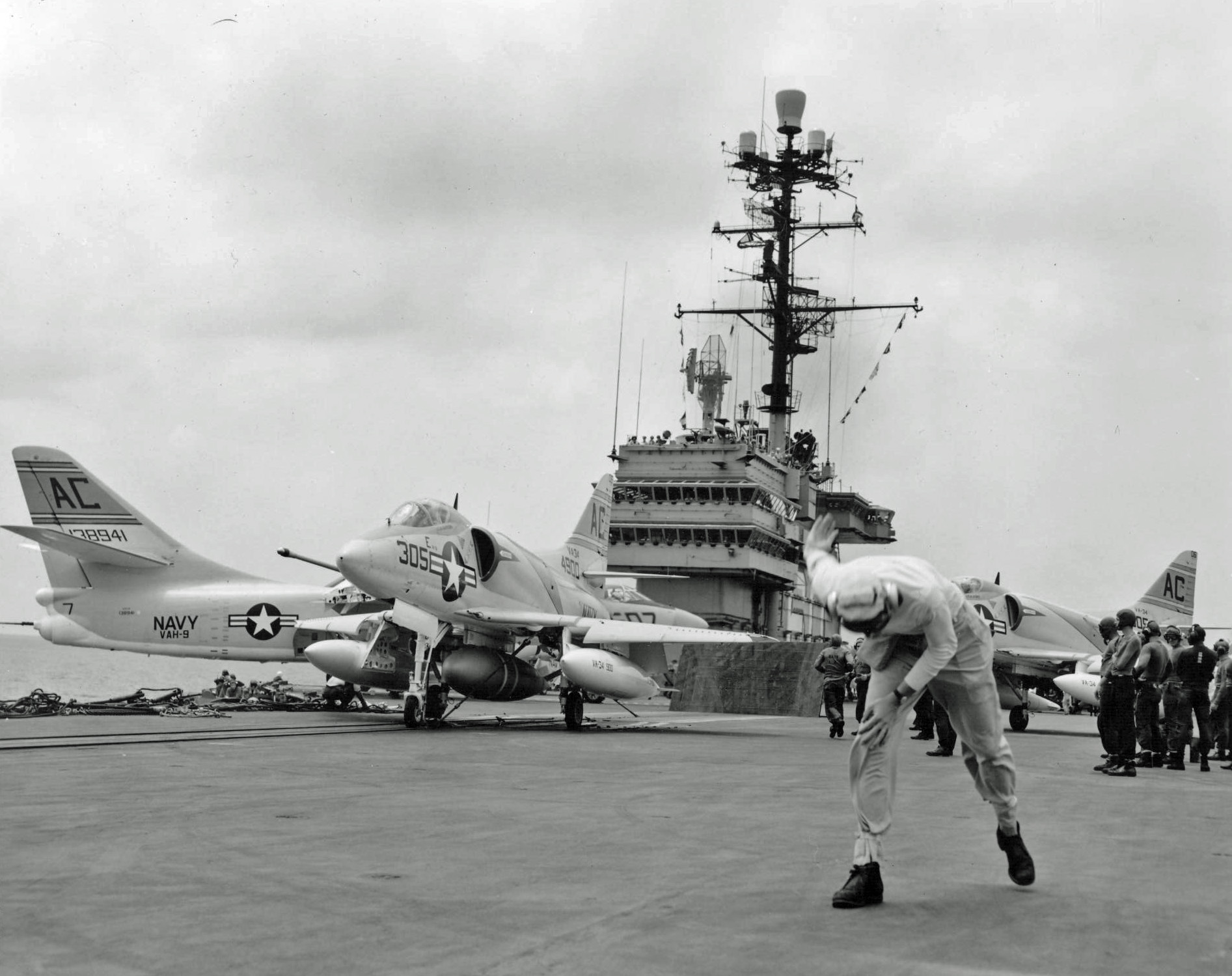
A Douglas A4D-2 carrying a Mk 7 bomb on the USS Saratoga in the early 1960s

- English Electric Canberra (Royal Air Force)
- Douglas F3D-2B Skyknight
- Douglas A-1 Skyraider
- Douglas A-3 Skywarrior
- Douglas A-4 Skyhawk
- Martin B-57 Canberra
- McDonnell F2H Banshee
- McDonnell F3H Demon
- McDonnell F-101 Voodoo
- North American FJ Fury
- North American B-45 Tornado
- North American F-100 Super Sabre
- Republic F-84 Thunderjet

== See also ==
- RDS-4
- List of nuclear weapons
