= Ramos (disambiguation) =

Ramos is a surname of Spanish and Portuguese origin.

Ramos may also refer to:

- Ramos, Tarlac, a municipality in the Philippines
- Ramos Island, an island in the Solomon Islands
- Ramos, Rio de Janeiro, a subdivision in Rio de Janeiro's north side

== See also ==
- Ramo (disambiguation)
