= ASM-N-6 Omar =

XASM-N-6 Omar
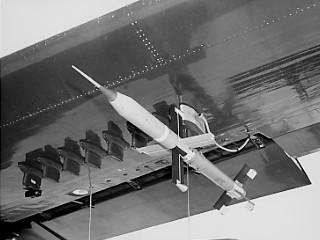
- Type: Air-to-surface missile
- Place of origin: United States

Service history
- Used by: United States Navy

Production history
- Designed: 1951
- Manufacturer: Eastman Kodak

Specifications
- Mass: <100 pounds (45 kg)
- Length: <10 feet (3.0 m)
- Diameter: 5 inches (130 mm)
- Guidance system: Optical beam riding
- References: Ordway and Wakeford

The ASM-N-6 Omar was a short-range air-to-surface missile developed for and evaluated by the United States Navy in the early 1950s. Intended to use existing unguided rockets as a basis and using a novel guidance system involving optical beam-riding, the program was unable to resolve difficulties with the guidance system and was cancelled without entering service.

== Design and development ==
Designed by Eastman Kodak in response to an urgent requirement by the U.S. Navy for a stand-off air-to-ground weapon for use in the Korean War, the Omar, designated XASM-N-6, was authorized for development on 20 August 1951. Based on the airframe of the standard 5 in (130 mm) High Velocity Aircraft Rocket, cruciform fins were mounted at the mid and aft portions of the rocket body to provide stabilization and control. An optical beam riding guidance system was developed for use with Omar; the launching aircraft would project an intense beam of light at the target, and aft-facing sensors on the missile would track the light source, keeping the missile on course to its target. The Omar shared some parts of its control system with the AAM-N-7 Sidewinder air-to-air missile.

== Operational history ==
Test launches of Omar began in late 1951; testing showed that the guidance system failed to prove as effective as had been expected. Issues were found with the beam of light "spreading" as it covered the distance to the target, and the issue of the launching aircraft having to remain on course to the target, a common issue with early guided missiles, could not be solved; in mid-1952 the program was cancelled, funding being redirected to the Sidewinder program. The following year a modification of the seeker head, nicknamed "Ramo" (for 'reverse Omar') was tested, evaluating a frequency modulation system to encode the light beam to refine the guidance. This proved no more effective, and the system was cancelled entirely, although some details of the frequency encoding were used in the development of the SAM-N-7 Terrier program.
