= BOAR =

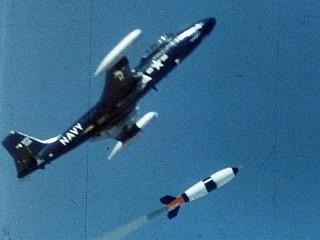
- BOAR rocket launch from a F2H Banshee
- Type: Air-to-surface missile
- Place of origin: United States

Service history
- In service: 1956–1963
- Used by: United States Navy

Production history
- Manufacturer: Naval Ordnance Test Station

Specifications (Mk 1 Mod 0)
- Mass: 2,000 pounds (910 kg)
- Length: 15.3 ft (4.65 m)
- Diameter: 30.5 inches (770 mm)
- Wingspan: 54 inches (1,400 mm)
- Warhead: W7 nuclear
- Blast yield: 20 kilotons of TNT (84 TJ)
- Engine: Solid-fuel rocket 15,000 lb_{f} (67 kN)
- Operational range: 7.5 miles (12.1 km)
- Maximum speed: 480 miles per hour (770 km/h)
- Guidance system: None
- Launch platform: Douglas AD Skyraider; McDonnell F2H Banshee

The Bombardment Aircraft Rocket, also known as BOAR, the Bureau of Ordnance Aircraft Rocket, and officially as the 30.5-Inch Rocket, Mark 1, Mod 0, was an unguided air-to-surface rocket developed by the United States Navy's Naval Ordnance Test Station during the 1950s. Intended to provide a standoff nuclear capability for carrier-based aircraft, the rocket entered operational service in 1956, remaining in service until 1963.

== Design and development ==
Following a specification developed during 1951, the development of the BOAR rocket was started in 1952 at the Naval Ordnance Test Station (NOTS), located at China Lake, California. The project was intended to provide a simple means of extending the stand-off range of nuclear weapons delivered using the toss bombing technique, as some slower aircraft still faced marginal escape conditions when delivering ordinary gravity bombs even with the use of this technique.

The rocket that emerged from the development process used a single, solid-fueled rocket motor mated to the W7 nuclear weapon, which had a yield of 20 kilotons of TNT (84 TJ). This provided a stand-off range of 7.5 miles (12.1 km) when released in a steep climb, the aircraft then completing the toss-bombing pullout to escape the blast; the rocket, lacking guidance, would follow a ballistic trajectory to impact following rocket burnout.

== Operational history ==
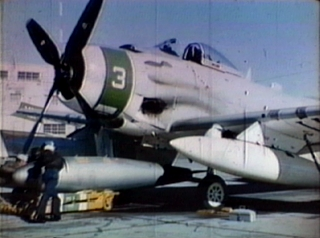
BOAR being loaded on AD-7 Skyraider

Entering flight trials in 1953, BOAR proved satisfactory. Twenty test firings during the course of 1955 were conducted without a single failure, and in 1956 the rocket entered operational service. A variety of aircraft carried BOAR operationally but it was primarily used by the AD Skyraider, the slowest nuclear-armed aircraft in the Navy's inventory.

BOAR was intended to be an interim weapon; a more advanced development, Hopi, entered flight testing during 1958. Hopi, however, failed to enter production, and BOAR remained the only standoff nuclear air-to-surface missile fielded by the Navy.

225 examples of the BOAR rocket were produced by NOTS. In service, the rocket proved unpopular with the pilots of the aircraft assigned to carry it: the loft-bombing maneuver, called an "idiot loop", was considered dangerous. By 1963, maintenance issues with the solid rocket motor were proving acute, and the rocket was removed from the inventory during that year.
