= B46 nuclear bomb =

American high-yield thermonuclear bomb

The B46 nuclear bomb (or Mk-46) was an American high-yield thermonuclear bomb which was designed and tested in the late 1950s. It was never deployed. Though originally intended to be a production design, the B46 ended up being only an intermediate prototype of the B-53 and was test fired several times. These prototypes were known as TX-46 units (Test/Experimental).

The B46 design roughly weighed 8,120 pounds (3,680 kg) and was about 37 inches (94 cm) in diameter. It was intended to have a 9 megaton yield.

The design history of the B46 apparently derives most immediately from the older, larger Mark 21 nuclear bomb design, which was a design derivative of the Shrimp design which was the first US solid fueled thermonuclear bomb test fired in the Castle Bravo test.

The B46 was test fired in Operation Hardtack I in 1958; the fission primary (see Teller-Ulam design) was test fired by itself in Hardtack Butternut with 81 kiloton estimated yield, the full weapon test fired in Hardtack Yellowwood and fizzled with only 330 kiloton yield, and was fired again in Hardtack Oak to full 8.9 megaton yield.

The B46 design concepts were taken forwards into a new weapon design in 1959, the TX-53, which was redesignated the B53 nuclear bomb and W53 warhead. 50 B53 bombs were in US inactive reserves from 1997 to 2011, though none were actively deployed during that period.

Towards the end of 1955, consideration was given to using the physics package of the TX-46 aerial bomb as a warhead for the USAF Snark intercontinental cruise missile. Consideration to use one of the Army's PGM-11 Redstone SRBM was also given. The XW-46/Redstone was canceled in favor of the Titan II/W-53 combination in April 1958.

== See also ==
- B53 nuclear bomb
- Mark 21 nuclear bomb
- Castle Bravo
- Operation Hardtack I tests including Butternut, Yellowwood, and Oak
- List of nuclear weapons
