= Spacefest =

Annual convention on space science and art in Arizona, United States

- Status: Active
- Genre: Space science, art, memorabilia
- Venue: JW Marriott Starr Pass Resort (most years)
- Locations: Tucson, Arizona
- Country: United States
- Inaugurated: 2007
- Founder: Kim Poor
- Organizer: Novaspace Galleries

Spacefest is a semi-annual convention held in Tucson, Arizona, focused on space exploration, spaceflight history, astronomical art, and science communication. Organized by Novaspace Galleries, the event features presentations by astronauts, planetary scientists, engineers, and artists, art exhibitions, and memorabilia sales.

== History ==
Spacefest was first held in 2007 in Mesa, Arizona, organized by Kim Poor and Sally Poor of Novaspace Galleries. It was created to combine space art with astronaut engagement, and has since expanded to include a wide range of science and public outreach activities.

After the inaugural event, Spacefest was relocated to Tucson, where it has been held regularly at the JW Marriott Starr Pass Resort. Kim Poor remained involved with the event until his death in 2017. The convention has continued under the direction of Sally Poor and daughter Kelsey Poor. Following a hiatus during the Covid pandemic, planning is currently underway for future events in 2026 and beyond.

== Program ==
Spacefest has included panel discussions and Q&A sessions with former NASA astronauts and cosmonauts, including crew members from Mercury, X-15 Gemini, Apollo, Space Shuttle, ISS and Soyuz missions. Attendees have appreciated science lectures by mission engineers, planetary scientists, and researchers affiliated with organizations such as NASA, Jet Propulsion Laboratory, The Planetary Society, SETI, and academic institutions. Additionally, artists meet patrons at art exhibitions showcasing astronomical and spaceflight-themed artwork by members of the International Association of Astronomical Artists and other contributors. Autograph sessions, art sales, and merchandise exhibitions focused on historical and contemporary space exploration offer another opportunity to take home memories, and for families and young attendees, the conference offers educational and STEAM activities.

Special events have included musical performances and reunion appearances by astronaut-affiliated groups, such as Max-Q, a band formed by Space Shuttle-era astronauts.

== Attendance and Scope ==
Attendees include a combination of professional scientists, artists, educators, amateur space enthusiasts, collectors, and families. The event has been described as bridging technical, artistic, and historical interests related to human spaceflight and astronomy.

== Notable Guests ==
Past guests have included:

- Buzz Aldrin, Apollo 11
- Michael Collins, Apollo 11
- Fred Haise, Apollo 13, Shuttle ALT Tests
- Charlie Duke, Apollo 16
- Jim Lovell, Gemini 7, Gemini 12, Apollo 8, Apollo 13
- John Young, Gemini 3, Gemini 10, Apollo 10, Apollo 16, STS-1, STS-9
- Jim McDivitt, Gemini 4, Apollo 9
- Scott Carpenter, Mercury-Atlas 7
- Dave Scott, Gemini 8, Apollo 9, Apollo 15
- Rusty Schweickart, Apollo 9
- Thomas P. Stafford, Gemini 6, Gemini 9, Apollo 10, Apollo–Soyuz Test Project
- Gene Cernan, Gemini 9, Apollo 10, Apollo 17
- Alan Bean, Apollo 12, Skylab 3
- Dick Gordon, Gemini 11, Apollo 12
- Walt Cunningham, Apollo 7
- Edgar Mitchell, Apollo 14
- Al Worden, Apollo 15
- Joe Engle, X-15 Flight 138, X-15 Flight 143, X-15 Flight 153, Shuttle ALT Tests, STS-2, STS-51-I
- Jack Lousma, Skylab 3, STS-3
- Bill Pogue, Skylab 4
- Ed Gibson, Skylab 4
- Vance Brand, Apollo–Soyuz Test Project, STS-5, STS-41-B, STS-35
- Hoot Gibson, Shuttle astronaut and commander STS-41-B, STS-61-C, STS-27, STS-47, STS-71
- Eileen Collins, Shuttle Shuttle astronaut and commander, STS-63, STS-84, STS-93, STS-114
- Nicole Stott, STS-128, STS-129, STS-133
- Rhea Seddon, STS-51-D, STS-40, STS-58
- Kathy Sullivan, STS-41-G, STS-31, STS-45
- Anna Fisher, STS-51-A
- Kathryn Thornton, STS-33, STS-49, STS-61, STS-73
- Mario Runco Jr., STS-44, STS-54, STS-77
- Charles D. Walker, STS-41-D, STS-51-D, STS-61-B
- Steven Hawley, STS-41-D, STS-61-C, STS-31, STS-82
- Gennady Padalka, cosmonaut Soyuz TM-28, Soyuz TMA-4 (Expedition 9), Soyuz TMA-14 (Expedition 19/20), Soyuz TMA-04M (Expedition 31/32), Soyuz TMA-16M (Expedition 43/44)
- Brian Cox, CERN
- Carolyn Porco, Space Science Institute
- Phil Plait
- Geoffrey Notkin
- Seth Shostak, SETI Institute
- Richard Hatch
- Andrew L. Chaikin
- LeVar Burton
- Gary Lockwood
- Keir Dullea
- Members of the International Association of Astronomical Artists

== See also ==
- International Association of Astronomical Artists
- List of science fiction conventions
- Space art
