= International Association of Astronomical Artists =

The International Association of Astronomical Artists (IAAA), is a non-profit organization whose members implement and participate in astronomical and space art projects, promote education about space art and foster international cooperation in artistic work inspired by the exploration of the Universe.

Kim Poor and others founded IAAA founded in 1982, and it was formally registered as an association of astronomical artists in 1986. Since its founding, the IAAA has grown to approximately 200 members, representing twenty countries. The organization serves the community of artists creating works inspired by astronomy and outer space, serving as a networking resource on topics specific to the trade as well as issues common to professional artists. Although the early practitioners in the 1930s and 40s, such as Lucien Rudaux and Chesley Bonestell, (see Space Art) were realists, many IAAA artists produce work which is impressionistic, expressionistic, abstract or surreal; however, the majority (unlike science fiction and fantasy artists, who work almost purely from imagination) do have a background in astronomy, physics and mathematics which enables them to interpret accurately the data from observatories and space probes, and convert them into believable images.

They may also be called upon to depict those very probes and satellites (often working with NASA or JPL scientists) – for who is out there to photograph them? They paint in oils, acrylics, gouache and markers, use pens, pastels or coloured pencils, or the latest digital technology. But these artists have an advantage over mere technology, for they can travel where machines cannot; and this includes into the past, the future and faster than light.

A major activity of the IAAA is space art workshops, in most cases at remote locations with geology common to what has been discovered on other worlds. Iceland, Death Valley, Hawaii, The Colorado Plateau including Meteor Crater, and other locations with a sense of the unworldly about them have been visited in workshops. Painting and sketching such scenery outdoors helps in training the artist to know the landscape and the forces shaping it, as well as to reinforce the sensory impressions one is putting into their work of the effects of light and shade in the atmosphere.

IAAA artists participate in the annual Spacefest convention which brings together artists and some of the top names in space exploration.
