= Kim Poor (space artist) =

American artist (1952–2017)

Kim Paul Poor (March 7, 1952 – August 16, 2017) was an American space artist, founder and chef executive officer of Novaspace Galleries, and creator of Spacefest, a widely attended, multiyear event documenting and celebrating American and international endeavors in space exploration.

His vivid airbrushed cosmic scenes appeared in magazines, on television, at planetariums, and international exhibitions sponsored by NASA and other organizations.

== Early life and education ==
Kim Poor was born in Phoenix, Arizona, on March 7, 1952. He studied both fine art and astronomical subjects, cultivating a lifelong interest in scientifically grounded visualizations. He later settled in Tucson, Arizona, with his wife, Sally, and their children, Kelsey and Nathan.

== Career ==
Poor became widely known for his airbrush technique, emphasizing luminous color and dramatic perspective in cosmic landscapes. His artwork appeared in science magazines, including Omni, Discover, Astronomy, Sky & Telescope, Science Digest, Germany’s Kosmos, and Russia’s Ogoniok. Notably, his painting Bajada Chubasco was featured on the back cover of The Planetary Report in January/February 1982.

The visual storytelling of science-fiction television benefited from his set-art for series including Alien Nation, SeaQuest DSV, and Babylon 5. He also collaborated with astronauts on art events, solidifying his reputation within the space community.

=== Novaspace and Spacefest ===
Poor founded Novaspace Galleries in Tucson, which became a hub for space art and astronaut memorabilia. In 2007, he created Spacefest, a space-art and astronaut conference featuring luminaries like astronauts Buzz Aldrin and Alan Bean, and space scientists such as Brian Cox and Carolyn Porco and noted for its extensive exhibition space, professional organization, and platform for bringing together the larger international space exploration community.

=== Exhibitions and commissions ===
His work was commissioned by the National Air & Space Museum and featured in planetariums, textbooks, and exhibitions worldwide, including collections of astronauts and NASA staff.

In 1987, he led a U.S. delegation of space artists to Moscow for a Sputnik 30th-anniversary exhibition, and his work remains in the Yuri Gagarin Museum in Russia's Star City.

=== Organizational leadership ===
In 1986, he co‑founded the International Association of Astronomical Artists (IAAA), becoming its first president. Under his leadership, the group formalized workshops and global art collaborations.

== Selected works ==
Many of Poor's artworks were released as signed, limited-edition lithographs, including Emerald Dawn (also called The Green Piece). His 1990s space-art calendars, especially the 1996 edition, became collectible.

== Death ==
Poor died on August 16, 2017, at his home in Tucson, aged 65, from complications related to Machado-Joseph disease, a neurodegenerative disorder he had been diagnosed with in 2000.

== Legacy ==
Poor is celebrated for raising the profile of space art through institutional commissions, international exhibitions, and event curation. His efforts fostered astronau–artist collaborations and cross-cultural connections between U.S. and Soviet artists during the 20th-century Cold War.

== See also ==
- Astronomical art
- List of American artists
- List of people from Phoenix
- List of people from Tucson, Arizona
- List of space artists
