= Flight 188 =

Flight 188 may refer to:

Listed chronologically

- X-15 Flight 188, a record-setting flight on 3 October 1967
- Northwest Airlines Flight 188, flew off-course due to pilot error on 21 October 2009
