= Robert Michael White =

US Air Force general

Robert M. White
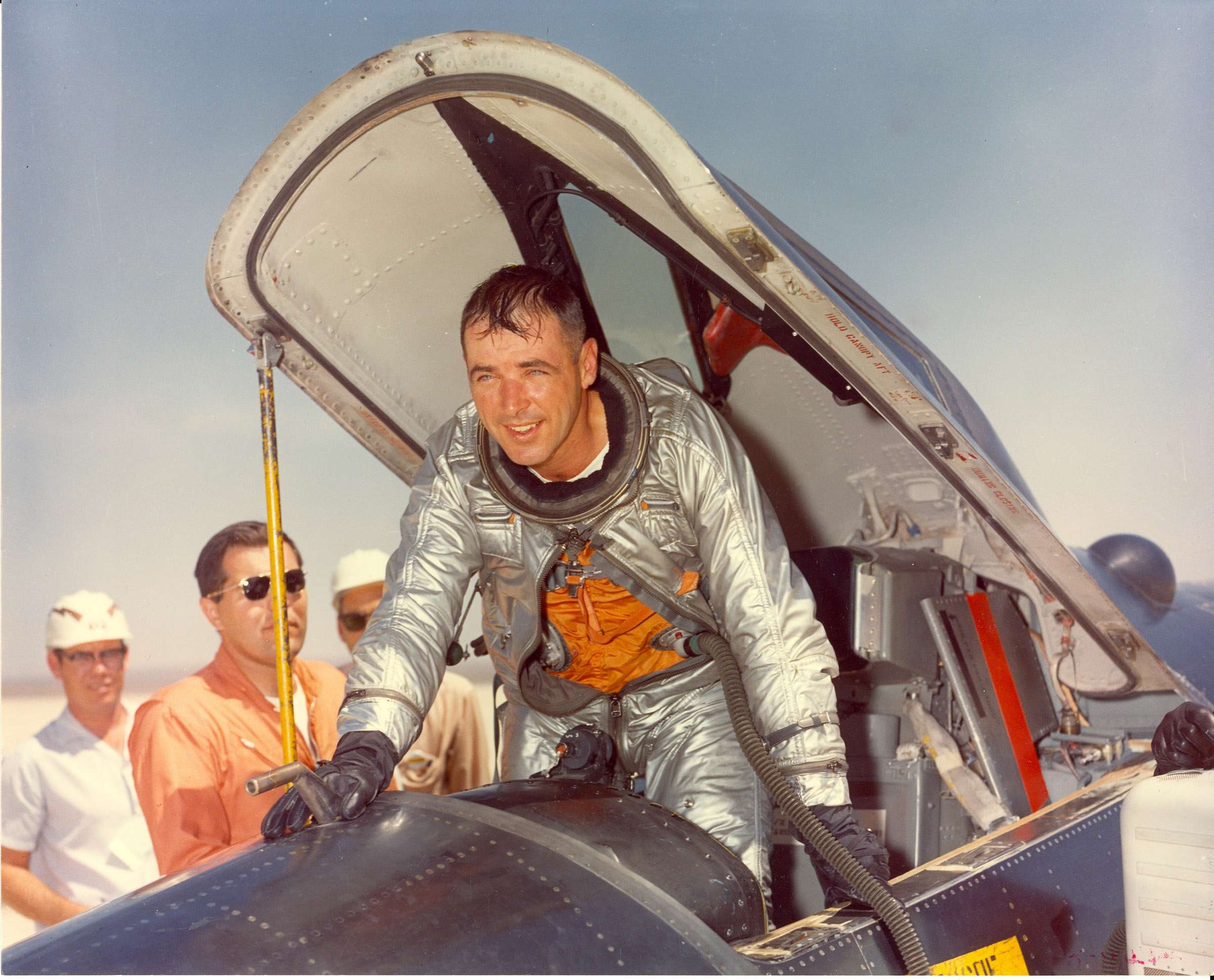
- Born: July 6, 1924; New York City, U.S.
- Died: March 17, 2010 (aged 85); Orlando, Florida, U.S.
- Other name: Robert Michael White
- Education: NYU, B.S. 1951; GWU, MBA 1966
- Occupation: Test pilot
- Space career

USAF astronaut
- Rank: Major General, USAF
- Selection: 1957 MISS Group
- Mission: X-15 Flight 62
- Retired: February 1, 1981
- Military career
- Allegiance: United States of America
- Branch: United States Army Air Forces; United States Air Force
- Service years: 1942–1946; 1951–1981
- Rank: Major General
- Commands: 53rd Tactical Fighter Squadron
- Conflicts: World War II; Korean War; Vietnam War
- Awards: Air Force Cross; Air Force Distinguished Service Medal (2); Army Distinguished Service Medal; Silver Star (4); Legion of Merit; Distinguished Flying Cross (5); Air Medal (17)

Robert Michael White (July 6, 1924 – March 17, 2010) (Maj Gen, USAF) was an American electrical engineer, test pilot, fighter pilot, and astronaut. He was one of twelve pilots who flew the North American X-15, an experimental spaceplane jointly operated by the Air Force and NASA. As an engineer, he supervised the design and development of several modern military aircraft.

On July 17, 1962, he flew the X-15 to an altitude above 50 miles, thereby qualifying as an astronaut according to the United States definition of the boundary of space.

== Background and career ==
White was born in New York City on July 6, 1924. After graduating from high school, he entered active military service in November 1942 as an aviation cadet in the United States Army Air Forces, and received his pilot wings and commission as a second lieutenant in February 1944.

During World War II, he served with the 355th Fighter Group in the European Theater of Operations. He flew P-51 Mustangs from July 1944 until February 1945, when he was shot down over Germany on his 52nd combat mission. He was captured and remained a prisoner of war until his release in April 1945.

He then returned to the United States, left active duty in December 1945, and became a member of the Air Force Reserve at Mitchel Air Force Base, New York, while studying Electrical Engineering at New York University. He earned his Bachelor of Science degree from there in 1951, and a Master of Business Administration degree from the George Washington University in 1966.

White was recalled to active duty in May 1951 for the Korean War, where he served as a pilot and engineering officer with the 514th Troop Carrier Wing at Mitchel Air Force Base. In February 1952, he was assigned as a fighter pilot and flight commander with the 40th Fighter-Interceptor Squadron, based at Johnson Air Base, Japan. In August 1953, he returned from overseas to serve as a systems engineer at Rome Air Development Center, Griffiss Air Force Base, New York.

== Test pilot ==
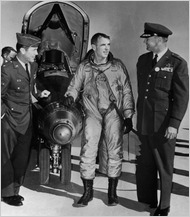
Congratulated after a test flight

White attended the United States Air Force's Experimental Flight Test Pilot School at Edwards Air Force Base, California, and became a test pilot, flying advanced models such as the F-86 Sabre, F-89 Scorpion, the new F-102 Delta Dagger, the F-104 Starfighter and the F-105 Thunderchief. He was promoted to Deputy Chief of the Flight Test Operations Division, later becoming Assistant Chief of the Manned Spacecraft Operations Branch.

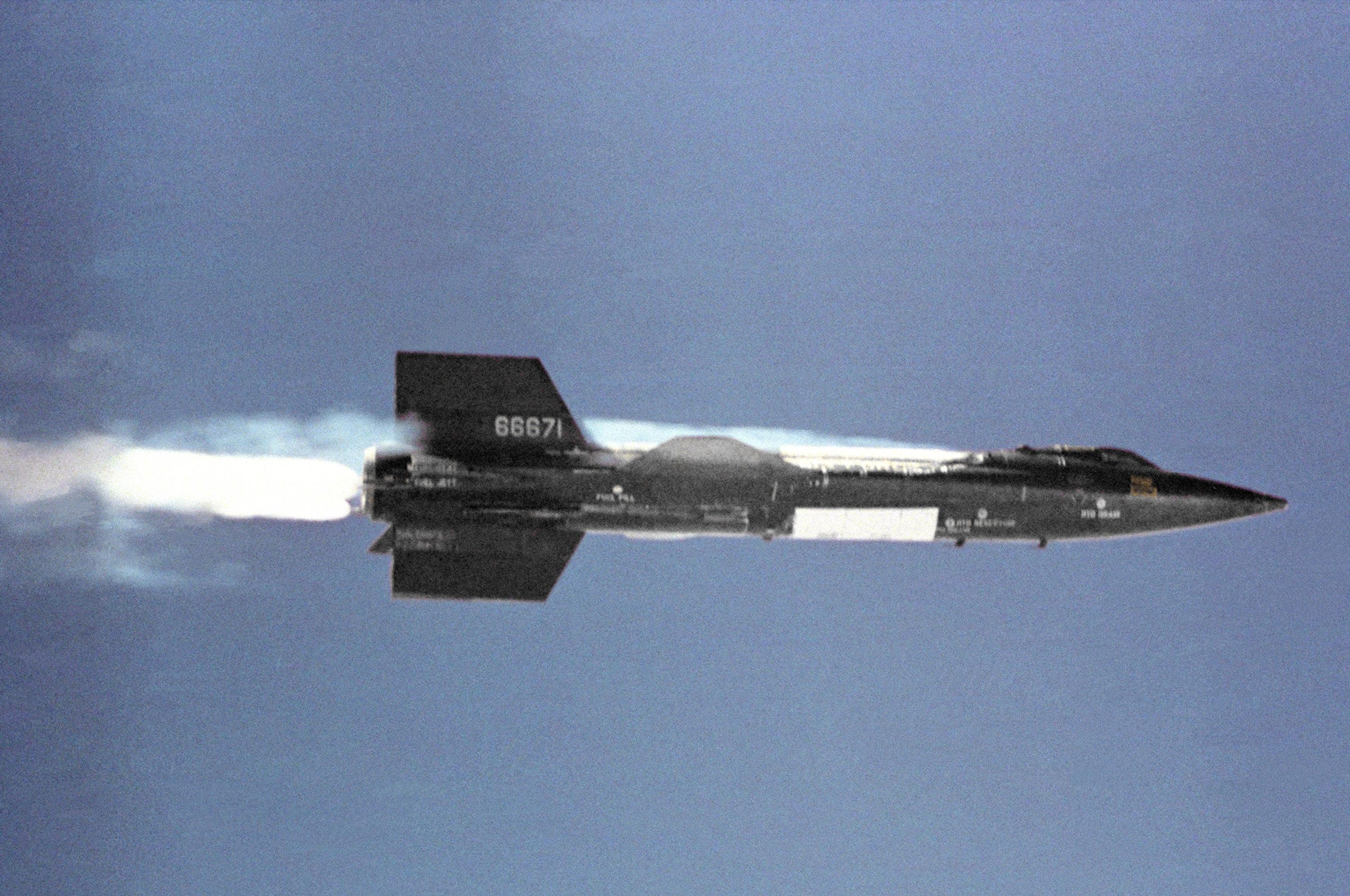
X-15 in flight

White was designated the Air Force's primary pilot for the North American X-15 program in 1958. While the new plane was undergoing its initial tests, he attended the Air Command and Staff College at Maxwell Air Force Base, Alabama, graduating in 1959. He made his first test flight of the X-15 on April 15, 1960, when the aircraft was fitted with two interim, 16,000 lbf (71 kN) XLR-11 thrust rocket engines. Four months later, he flew to an altitude of 136,000 feet (41.5 km) above Rogers Dry Lake. White would have participated in the Air Force's Man In Space Soonest program, had it come to fruition.

In February 1961, White unofficially set a new air speed record when he flew the X-15 at a speed of 2,275 mph (3,661 km/h), following the installation of a 57,000 lbf (250 kN) thrust XLR-99 engine. White was the first human to fly an aircraft at Mach 4 and later Mach 5 over the next eight months. On November 9, 1961, White flew the X-15 at 4,093 mph (6,587 km/h), making him the first pilot to fly a winged craft at six times the speed of sound (Mach 6). President John F. Kennedy used the occasion to confer the most prestigious award in American aviation, the Robert J. Collier Trophy, jointly to White and three of his fellow X-15 pilots: NASA's Joseph A. Walker, Commander Forrest S. Petersen of the U.S. Navy, and North American Aviation test pilot Scott Crossfield. A day later, Air Force Chief of Staff General Curtis E. LeMay awarded White his new rating as a Command Pilot Astronaut.

On July 17, 1962, Major White flew the X-15 to an altitude of 314,750 feet (59 miles, 96 km). This qualified him for USAF astronaut wings, becoming the first "winged" astronaut, and one of a few who have flown into space without a conventional spacecraft. Major Bob White was featured with a cover story in the August 3, 1962, issue of Life magazine, detailing his July 17 flight.

Pilot Robert White commented on his high altitude X-15 flights:

My flights to 217,000 feet [66 km] and 314,750 feet [96 km] were very dramatic in revealing the Earth's curvature ... at my highest altitude I could turn my head through a 180-degree arc and wow!—the Earth is really round. At my peak altitude I was roughly over the Arizona/California border in the area of Las Vegas, and this was how I described it: Looking to my left I felt I could spit into the Gulf of California; looking to my right I felt I could toss a dime into San Francisco Bay.

== Post-test pilot career ==
In October 1963, he returned to Germany, where he served as operations officer for the 22d Tactical Fighter Squadron, 36th Tactical Fighter Wing, flying F-105 Thunderchiefs at Bitburg Air Base, and from July 1964 to August 1965 as commander of the wing's 53d Tactical Fighter Squadron. He returned to the United States in August 1965 to attend the Industrial College of the Armed Forces, Washington, D.C., and graduated a year later. During the same period, he attended George Washington University, receiving his Master of Business Administration degree in 1966. Lieutenant Colonel White then was transferred to Air Force Systems Command at Wright-Patterson Air Force Base, Ohio, as chief of the Tactical Systems Office, F-111 Systems Program Office, where he served from September 1966 to May 1967.

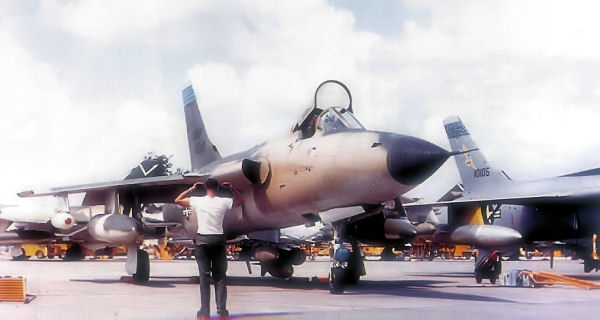
F-105D at Takhli RTAFB

In May 1967, during the Vietnam War, Colonel White was assigned as Deputy Commander for Operations of the 355th Tactical Fighter Wing, an F-105 unit based at Takhli Royal Thai Air Force Base, Thailand. He flew 70 combat missions over North Vietnam, including leading an attack against the Paul Doumer Bridge in Hanoi on August 11, 1967, for which he was awarded the Air Force Cross. He was transferred in October to the Seventh Air Force Headquarters at Tan Son Nhut Air Base, South Vietnam, serving as chief of the Attack Division in the Directorate of Combat Operations.

White returned to the United States and Wright-Patterson Air Force Base in June 1968, where he served as director of the F-15 Eagle Systems Program, responsible for managing development and production planning, in the Aeronautical Systems Division, Air Force Systems Command.

On July 31, 1970, White assumed duties as commander of the Air Force Flight Test Center, Edwards Air Force Base, where he was responsible for research and developmental flight testing of manned and unmanned aerospace vehicles, aircraft systems, deceleration devices and for the Air Force Test Pilot School. During his tenure, testing was begun on such important programs as the F-15 Air Superiority Fighter, the A-X ground attack aircraft, and the Airborne Warning and Control System. In October 1971, he completed the Naval Test Parachutist course and was awarded parachutist's wings.

He served at the Flight Test Center until October 17, 1972. The following month, he assumed the duties of Commandant, Air Force Reserve Officer Training Corps (AFROTC), responsible for the entire AFROTC officer accession program at all colleges and universities across the United States.

White was promoted to the grade of major general effective February 12, 1975, with date of rank July 1, 1972. In March became Chief of Staff of the Fourth Allied Tactical Air Force. He retired from active duty on February 1, 1981.

In 1992, White was inducted into the Aerospace Walk of Honor. General White was inducted into the National Aviation Hall of Fame in Dayton, Ohio, on 15 July 2006. A rumor abounds that in honor of his achievements, the Scaled Composites White Knight spacecraft launch plane was named after White and fellow X-15 pilot Pete Knight. Space Ship One and White Knight pilot/astronaut Brian Binnie reports this is not true.

He died on March 17, 2010, at the age of 85.

== Awards and decorations ==
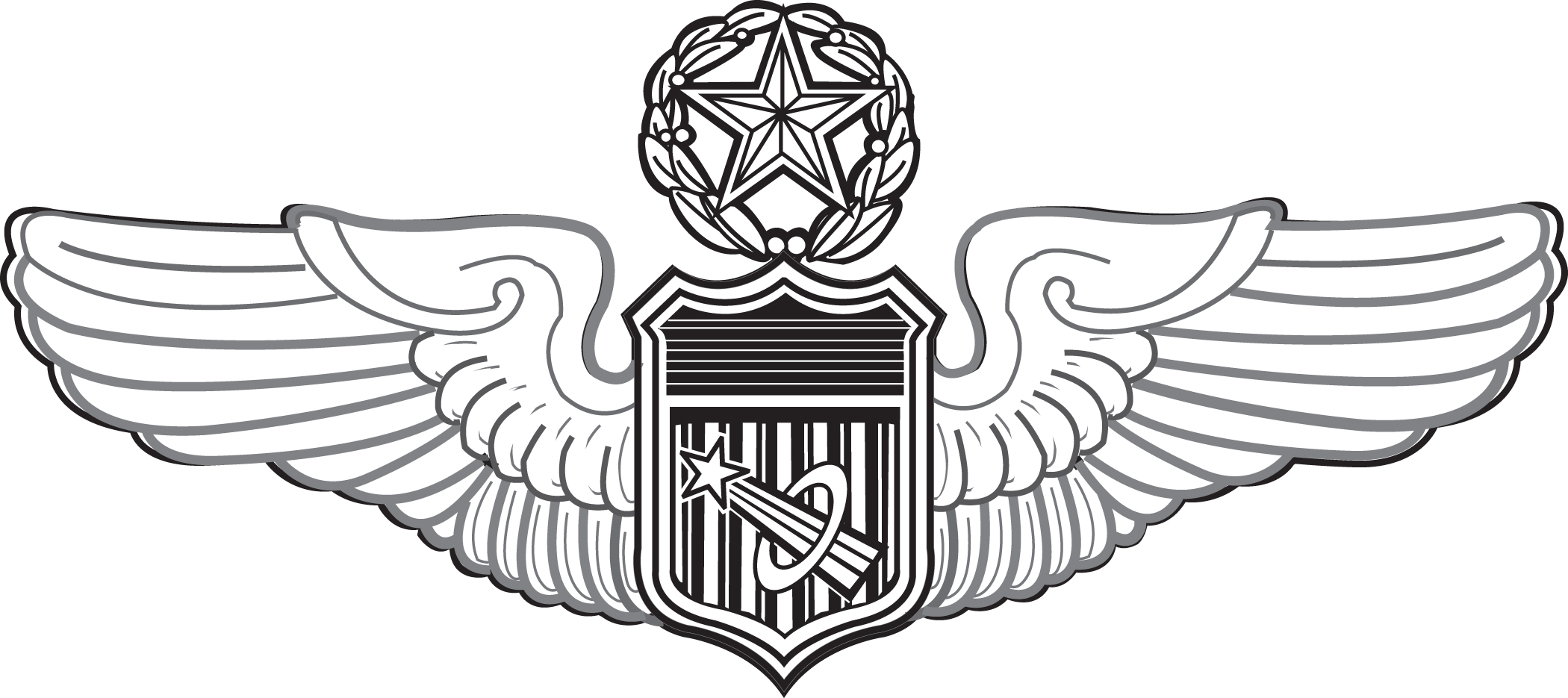

Air Force Command Pilot Badge with Astronaut Device
Air Force Parachutist Badge
Air Force Cross	Air Force Distinguished; Service Medal with cluster	Army Distinguished Service Medal	Silver Star with three clusters
Legion of Merit	Distinguished Flying Cross with four clusters	Bronze Star	Air Medal with sixteen clusters
Presidential Unit Citation	Outstanding Unit Award with cluster and "V" Device	Organizational Excellence Award	NASA Distinguished; Service Medal
Prisoner of War Medal	Army Good Conduct Medal	American Campaign Medal	European-African-Middle Eastern Campaign Medal with three stars
World War II Victory Medal	National Defense Service Medal with one star	Korean Service Medal with one star	Vietnam Service Medal with three stars
Air Force Longevity Service Award with eight clusters	Armed Forces Reserve Medal	Small Arms Expert Marksmanship Ribbon	Armed Forces Honor Medal
Vietnam Gallantry Cross Unit Citation with Palm	United Nations Korea Medal	Vietnam Campaign Medal	Korean War Service Medal

Other achievements

- 1960 Harmon International Aviators Trophy
- 1961 Collier Trophy, for invaluable technological contributions to the advancement of flight, and for great skill and courage as test pilots for the X-15.
- 1962 John J. Montgomery Award
- 1991 Elected to the American Philosophical Society

=== Air Force Cross citation ===
Colonel Robert M. White
U.S. Air Force
Date Of Action: August 11, 1967

The President of the United States of America, authorized by Title 10, Section 8742, United States Code, awards the Air Force Cross to Colonel Robert M. White, for extraordinary heroism in military operations against an opposing armed force as an F-105 Mission Commander near Hanoi, North Vietnam, on 11 August 1967. On that date, Colonel White led the entire combat force against a key railroad and highway bridge in the vicinity of Hanoi. In spite of 14 surface-to-air missile launches, MIG interceptor attacks, and intense antiaircraft artillery fire, he gallantly led the attack. By being the first aircraft to dive through the dark clouds of bursting flak, Colonel White set an example that inspired the remaining attacking force to destroy the bridge without a single aircraft being lost to the hostile gunners. Through his extraordinary heroism, superb airmanship, and aggressiveness in the face of hostile forces, Colonel White reflected the highest credit upon himself and the United States Air Force.

== Bibliography ==
- Thompson, Milton O. (1992). At The Edge Of Space: The X-15 Flight Program, Smithsonian Institution Press, Washington and London. ISBN 1-56098-107-5

Preceded by Iven Carl Kincheloe Jr.	Human altitude record 1960–1961	Succeeded by Joseph A. Walker
