= North American X-15 =

Rocket-powered aircraft and spaceplane operated by NASA and the US Air Force

X-15
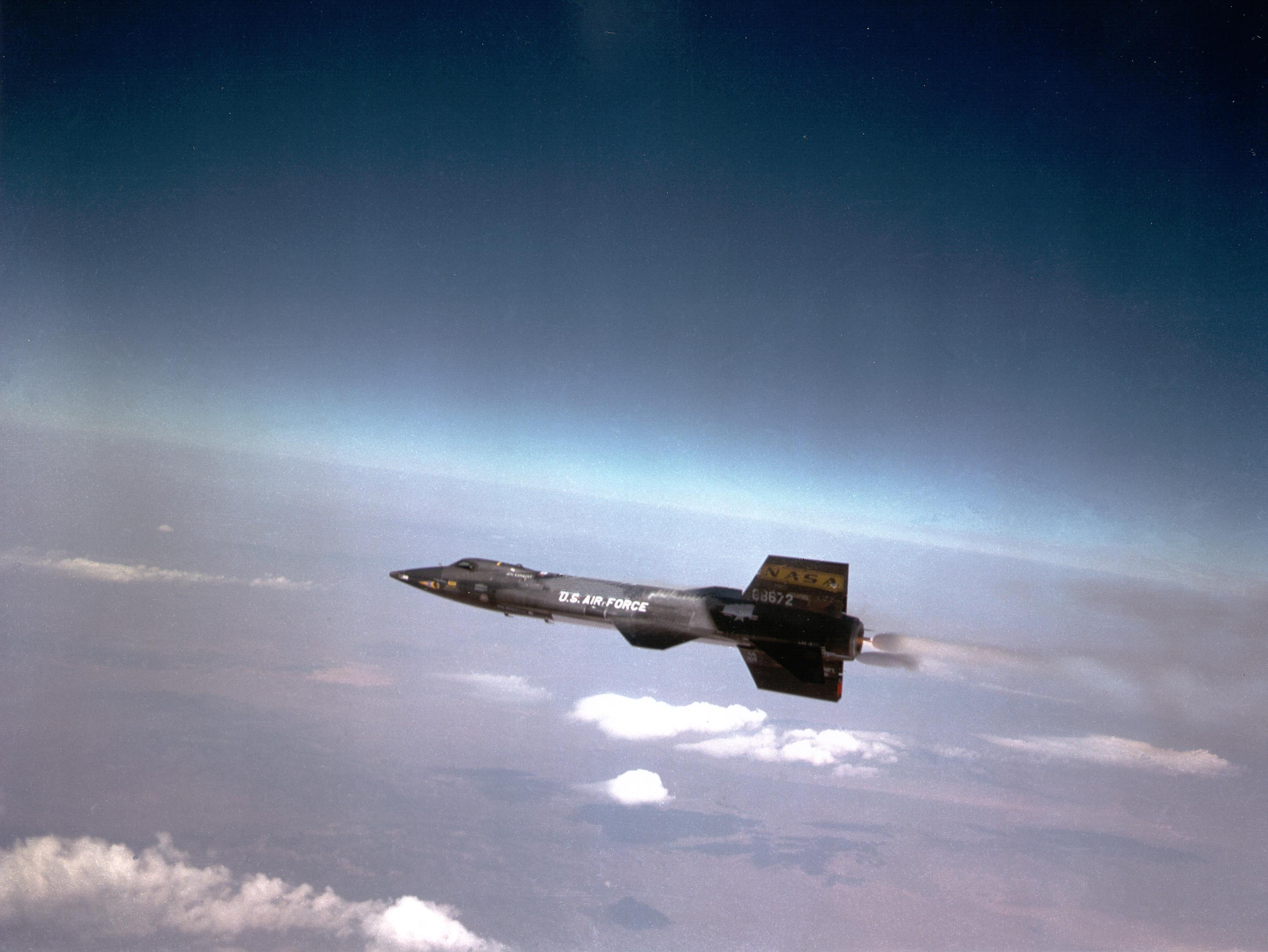
- X-15A-3 pulls away from its drop launch plane over Edwards Air Force Base during a mission in the 1960s.

General information
- Type: Experimental high-speed rocket-powered research aircraft
- Manufacturer: North American Aviation
- Primary users: United States Air Force NASA
- Number built: 3

History
- Introduction date: 17 September 1959
- First flight: 8 June 1959
- Retired: December 1968

The North American X-15 is a hypersonic rocket-powered aircraft built by North American Aviation, formerly operated by the United States Air Force and the National Aeronautics and Space Administration (NASA) as part of the X-plane series of experimental aircraft. The X-15 set speed and altitude records in the 1960s, crossing the edge of outer space and returning with valuable data used in aircraft and spacecraft design. The X-15's highest speed, 4,520 miles per hour (7,274 km/h; 2,021 m/s), was achieved on 3 October 1967, when William J. Knight flew at Mach 6.7 at an altitude of 102,100 feet (31,120 m), or 19.34 miles. This set the official world record for the highest speed ever recorded by a crewed, powered aircraft and remains unbroken.

During the X-15 program, 12 pilots flew a combined 199 flights. Of these, 8 pilots flew a combined 13 flights which met the Air Force spaceflight criterion by exceeding the altitude of 50 miles (80 km), thus qualifying these pilots as being astronauts; of those 13 flights, 2 (flown by the same civilian pilot) met the FAI definition (100 kilometres (62 mi)) of outer space. The 5 Air Force pilots qualified for military astronaut wings immediately, while the 3 civilian pilots were eventually awarded NASA astronaut wings in 2005, 35 years after the last X-15 flight.

== Design and development ==
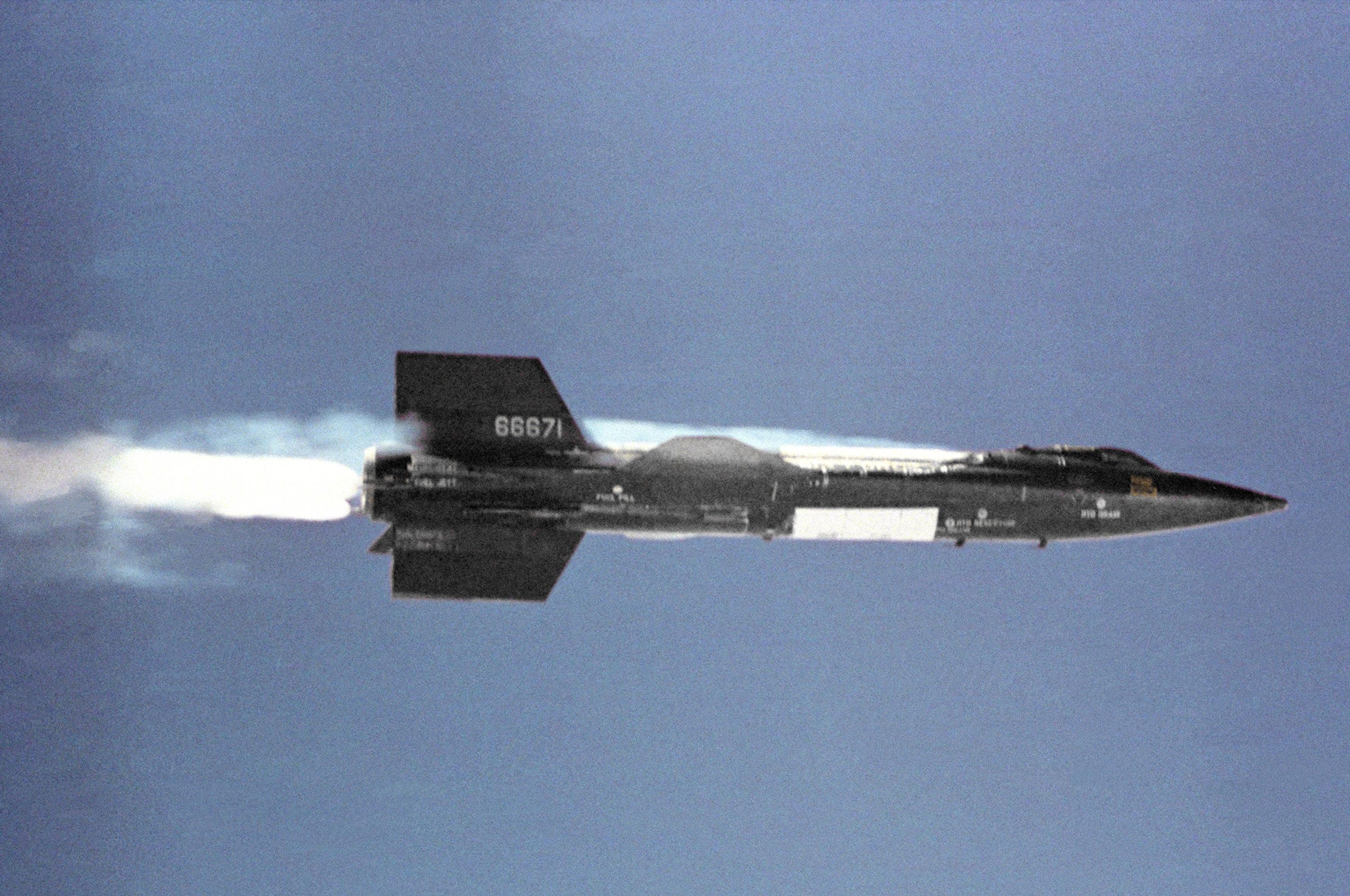
X-15 after igniting rocket engine

The X-15 was based on a concept study from Walter Dornberger for the National Advisory Committee for Aeronautics (NACA) of a hypersonic research aircraft. The requests for proposal (RFPs) were published on 30 December 1954 for the airframe and on 4 February 1955 for the rocket engine. The X-15 was built by two manufacturers: North American Aviation was contracted for the airframe in November 1955, and Reaction Motors was contracted for building the engines in 1956.

Like many X-series aircraft, the X-15 was designed to be carried aloft and drop launched from under the wing of a B-52 mother ship. Air Force NB-52A, "The High and Mighty One" (serial 52-0003), and NB-52B, "The Challenger" (serial 52-0008, also known as Balls 8) served as carrier planes for all X-15 flights. Release of the X-15 from NB-52A took place at an altitude of about 8.5 miles (45,000 ft; 13.7 km) and a speed of about 500 miles per hour (800 km/h). The X-15 fuselage was long and cylindrical, with rear fairings that flattened its appearance, and thick, dorsal and ventral wedge-fin stabilizers. Parts of the fuselage (the outer skin) were heat-resistant nickel alloy (Inconel-X 750). The retractable landing gear comprised a nose-wheel carriage and two rear skids. The skids did not extend beyond the ventral fin, which required the pilot to jettison it just before landing, and it being recovered by parachute.

=== Cockpit and pilot systems ===
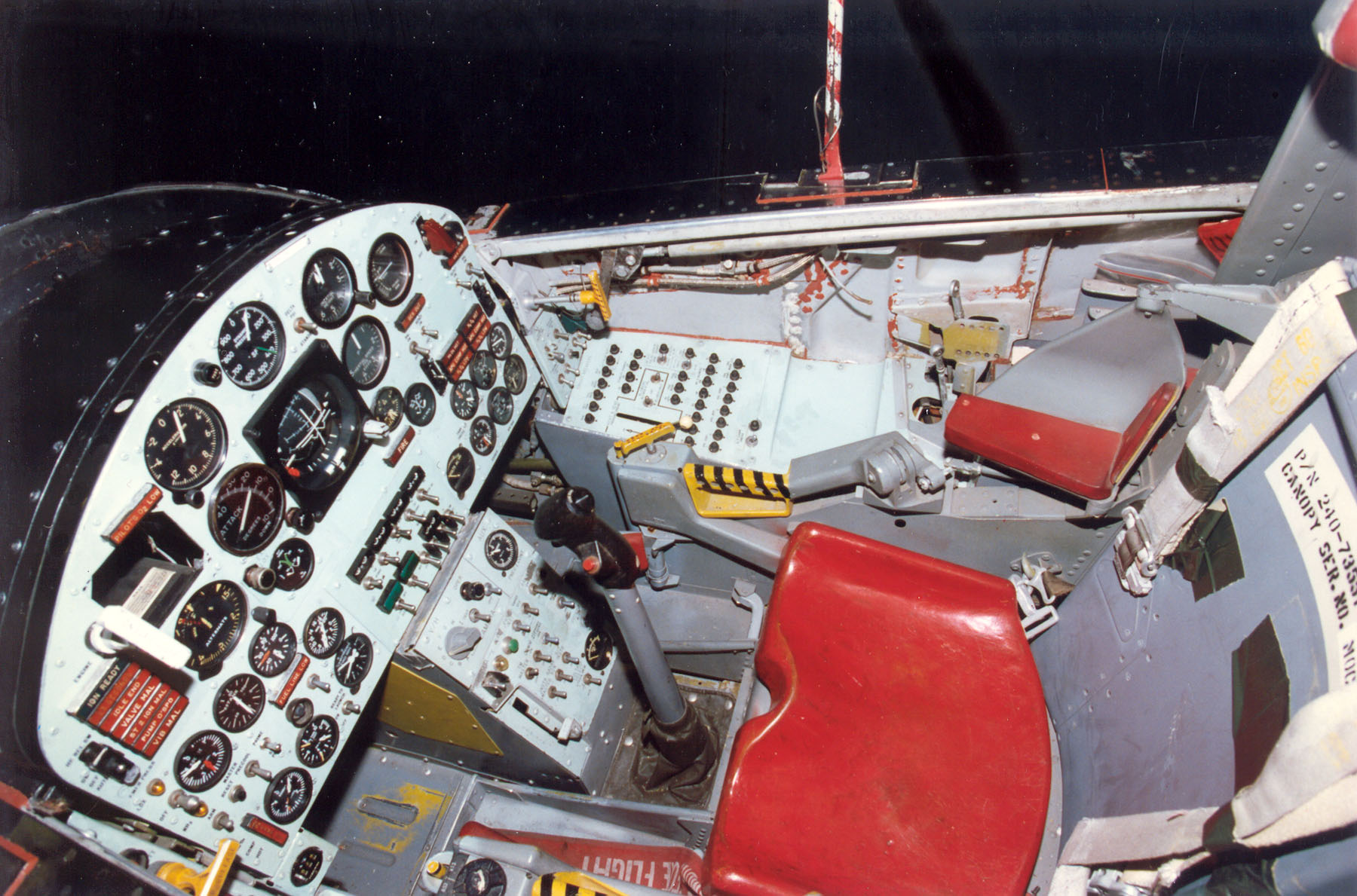
Cockpit of an X-15

The X-15 was the product of developmental research, and changes were made to various systems over the course of the program and between the different models. The X-15 was operated under several different scenarios, including attachment to a launch aircraft, drop, main engine start and acceleration, ballistic flight into thin air/space, re-entry into thicker air, unpowered glide to landing, and direct landing without a main-engine start. The main rocket engine operated only for a relatively short part of the flight but boosted the X-15 to its high speeds and altitudes. Without the main rocket engine thrust, the X-15's instruments and control surfaces remained functional, but the aircraft could not maintain altitude.

As the X-15 also had to be controlled in an environment where there was too little air for aerodynamic flight control surfaces, it had a reaction control system (RCS) that used rocket thrusters. There were two different X-15 pilot control setups: one used three joysticks, the other, one joystick.

The X-15 type with multiple control sticks for the pilot placed a traditional center stick between a left 3-axis joystick that sent commands to the reaction control system, and a third joystick on the right used during high-G maneuvers to augment the center stick. In addition to pilot input, the X-15 stability augmentation system (SAS) sent inputs to the aerodynamic controls to help the pilot maintain attitude control. The reaction control system (RCS) could be operated in two modes – manual and automatic. The automatic mode used a feature called reaction augmentation system (RAS) that helped stabilize the vehicle at high altitude. The RAS was typically used for approximately three minutes of an X-15 flight before automatic power off.

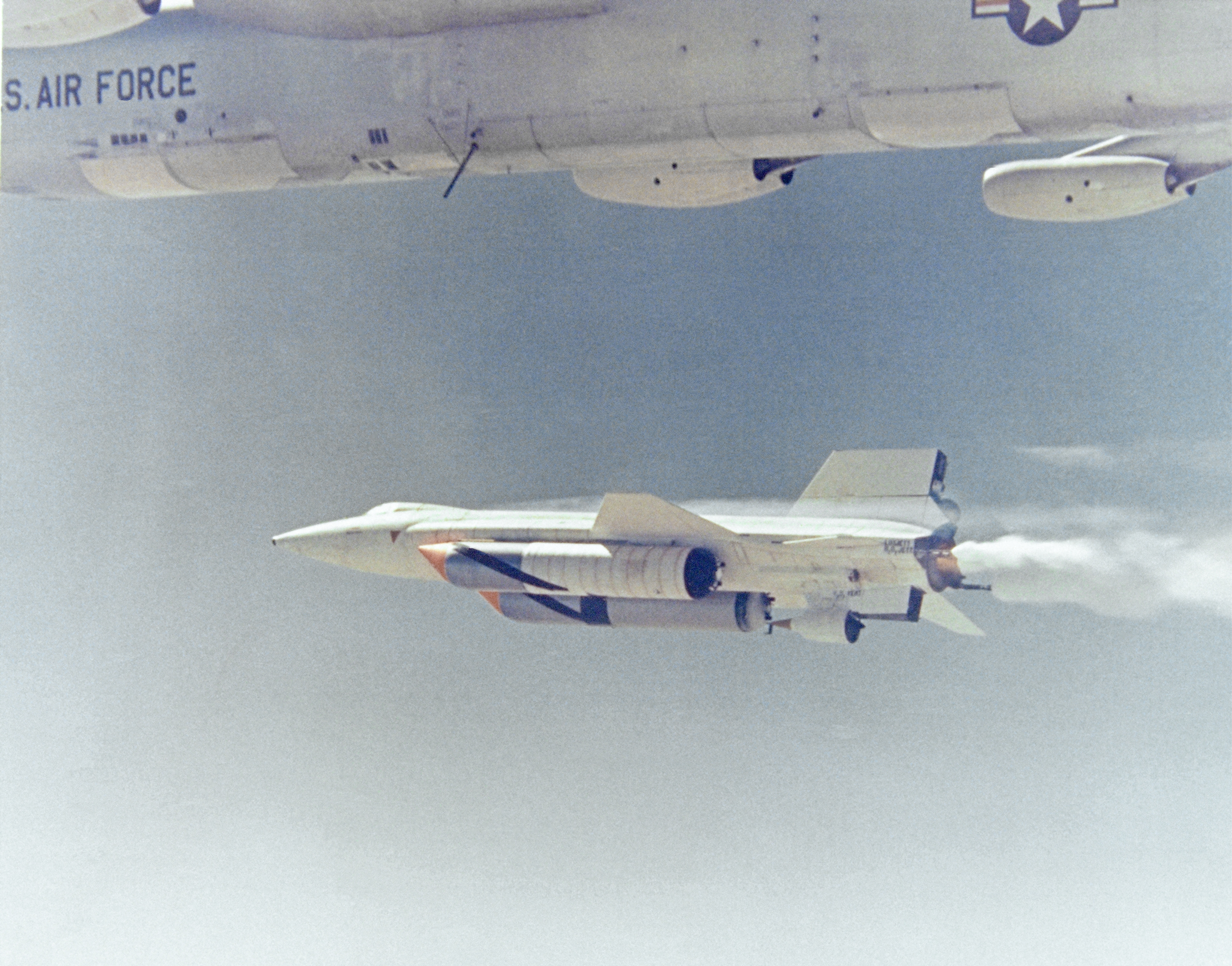
X-15A-2, with sealed ablative coating, external fuel tanks, and ramjet dummy test

The alternative control setup used the MH-96 flight control system, which allowed one joystick in place of three and simplified pilot input. The MH-96 could automatically blend aerodynamic and rocket controls, depending on how effective each system was at controlling the aircraft.

Among the many controls were the rocket engine throttle and a control for jettisoning the ventral tail fin. Other features of the cockpit included heated windows to prevent icing and a forward headrest for periods of high deceleration.

The X-15 had an ejection seat designed to operate at speeds up to Mach 4 (4,500 km/h; 2,800 mph) and 120,000 feet (23 mi; 37 km) altitude, although it was never used during the program. In the event of ejection, the seat was designed to deploy fins, which were used until it reached a safer speed and altitude at which to deploy its main parachute. Pilots wore pressure suits, which could be pressurized with nitrogen gas. Above 35,000 feet (11 km) altitude, the cockpit was pressurized to 3.5 psi (24 kPa; 0.24 atm) with nitrogen gas, while oxygen for breathing was fed separately to the pilot.

=== Propulsion ===
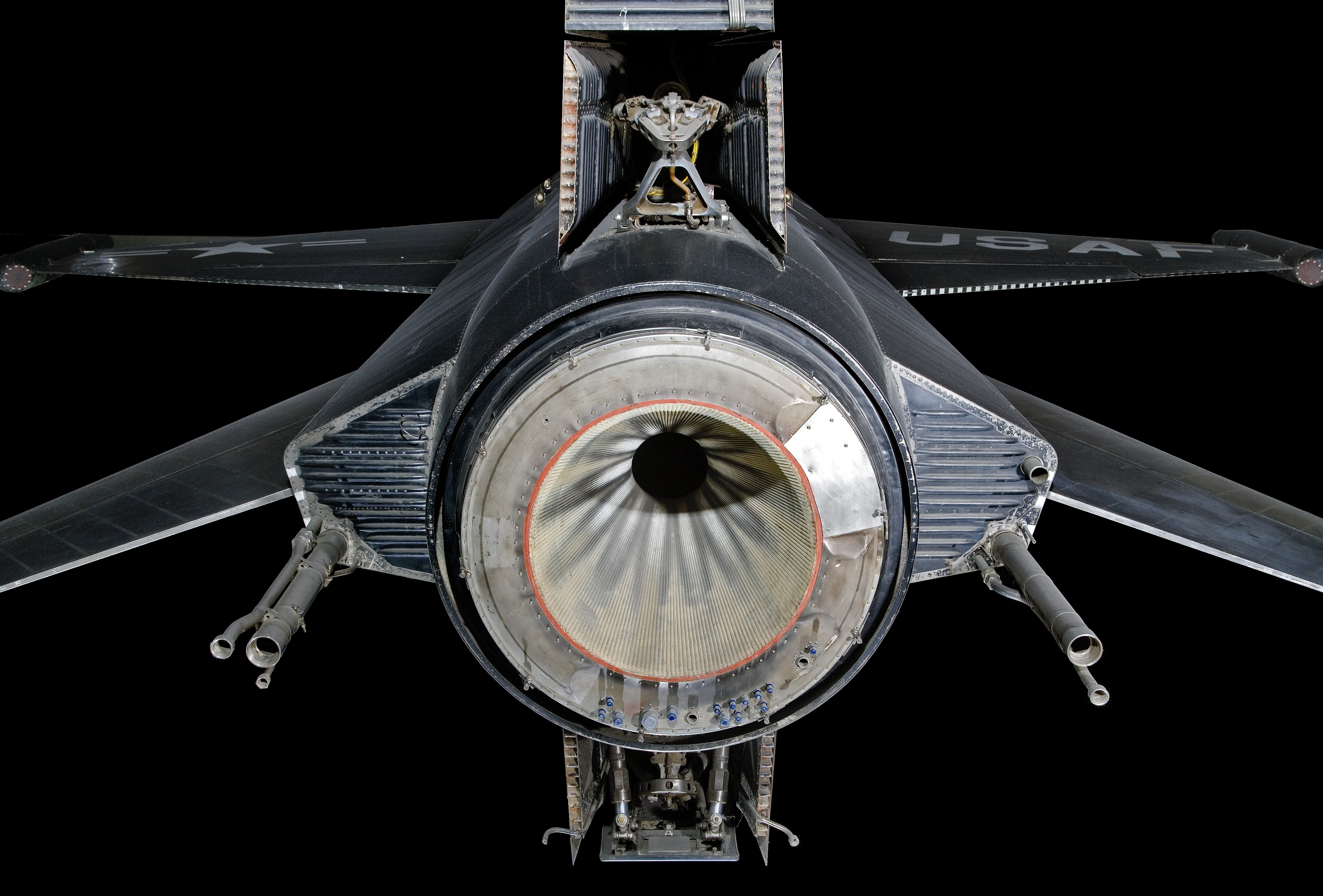
X-15 tail with XLR-99

The initial 24 powered flights used two Reaction Motors XLR11 liquid-propellant rocket engines, enhanced to provide a total of 16,000 pounds-force (71 kN) of thrust as compared to the 6,000 pounds-force (27 kN) that a single XLR11 provided in 1947 to make the Bell X-1 the first aircraft to fly faster than the speed of sound. The XLR11 used ethyl alcohol and liquid oxygen.

By November 1960, Reaction Motors delivered the XLR99 rocket engine, generating 57,000 pounds-force (250 kN) of thrust. The remaining 175 flights of the X-15 used XLR99 engines, in a single engine configuration. The XLR99 used anhydrous ammonia and liquid oxygen as propellant, and hydrogen peroxide to drive the high-speed turbopump that delivered propellants to the engine. It could burn 15,000 pounds (6,800 kg) of propellant in 80 seconds; Jules Bergman titled his book on the program Ninety Seconds to Space to describe the total powered flight time of the aircraft.

The X-15 reaction control system (RCS), for maneuvering in the low-pressure/density environment, used high-test peroxide (HTP), which decomposes into water and oxygen in the presence of a catalyst and could provide a specific impulse of 140 s (1.4 km/s). The HTP also fueled a turbopump for the main engines and auxiliary power units (APUs). Additional tanks for helium and liquid nitrogen performed other functions; the fuselage interior was purged with helium gas, and liquid nitrogen was used as coolant for various systems.

=== Wedge tail and hypersonic stability ===
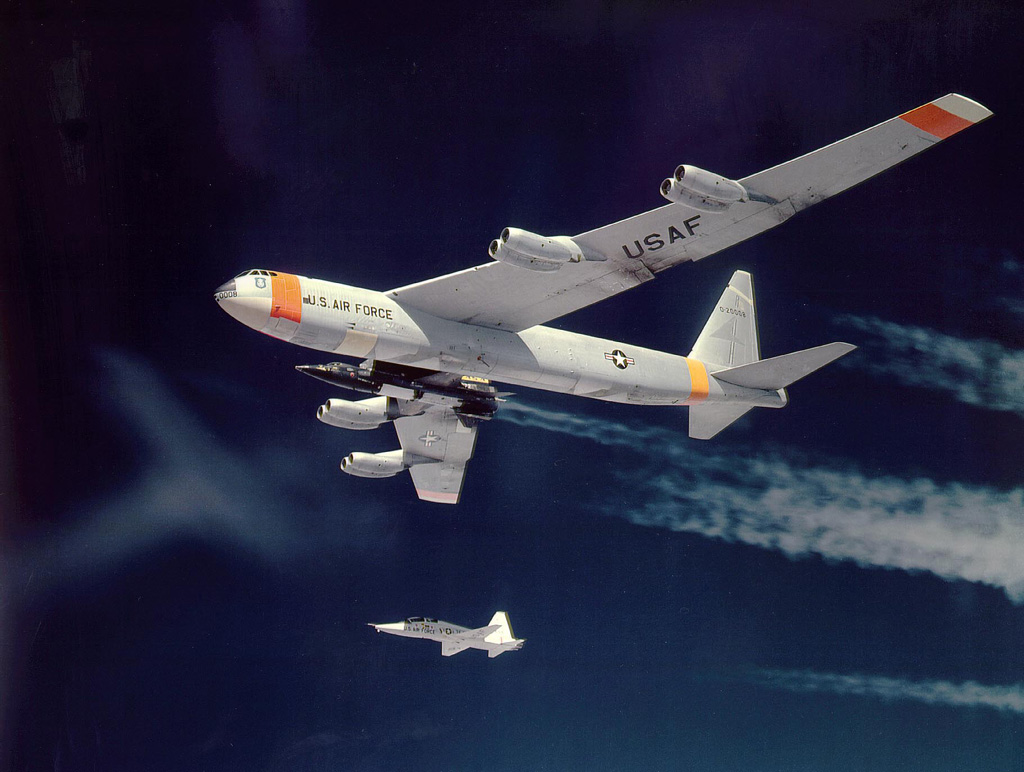
X-15 attached to its B-52 mother ship Balls 8 with a T-38 flying nearby

The X-15 had a thick wedge tail to enable it to fly in a steady manner at hypersonic speeds. This produced a significant amount of base drag at lower speeds; the blunt end at the rear of the X-15 could produce as much drag as an entire F-104 Starfighter.

A wedge shape was used because it is more effective than the conventional tail as a stabilizing surface at hypersonic speeds. A vertical-tail area equal to 60 percent of the wing area was required to give the X-15 adequate directional stability.

— Wendell H. Stillwell, X-15 Research Results (SP-60)

Stability at hypersonic speeds was aided by side panels that could be extended from the tail to increase the overall surface area, and these panels doubled as air brakes.

== Operational history ==
"Inside the X-15: NASA's Revolutionary Rocket Plane" (1959) Official NASA promotional film reel.

Before 1958, United States Air Force (USAF) and NACA officials discussed an orbital X-15 spaceplane, the X-15B that would launch into outer space from atop an SM-64 Navaho missile. This was canceled when the NACA became NASA and adopted Project Mercury instead.

By 1959, the Boeing X-20 Dyna-Soar space-glider program was to become the USAF's preferred means for launching military crewed spacecraft into orbit. This program was canceled in the early 1960s before an operational vehicle could be built. Various configurations of the Navaho were considered, and another proposal involved a Titan I stage.

Three X-15s were built, flying 199 test flights, the last on 24 October 1968.

The first X-15 flight was an unpowered glide flight by Scott Crossfield, on 8 June 1959. Crossfield also piloted the first powered flight on 17 September 1959, and his first flight with the XLR-99 rocket engine on 15 November 1960. Twelve test pilots flew the X-15. Among these were Neil Armstrong, later a NASA astronaut and the first man to set foot on the Moon, and Joe Engle, later a commander of NASA Space Shuttle missions.

In a 1962 proposal, NASA considered using the B-52/X-15 as a launch platform for a Blue Scout rocket to place satellites weighing up to 150 pounds (68 kg) into orbit.

In July and August 1963, pilot Joe Walker exceeded 100 km in altitude, joining NASA astronauts and Soviet cosmonauts as the first human beings to cross that line on their way to outer space. The USAF awarded astronaut wings to anyone achieving an altitude of 50 miles (80 km), while the FAI set the limit of space at 100 kilometers (62.1 mi).

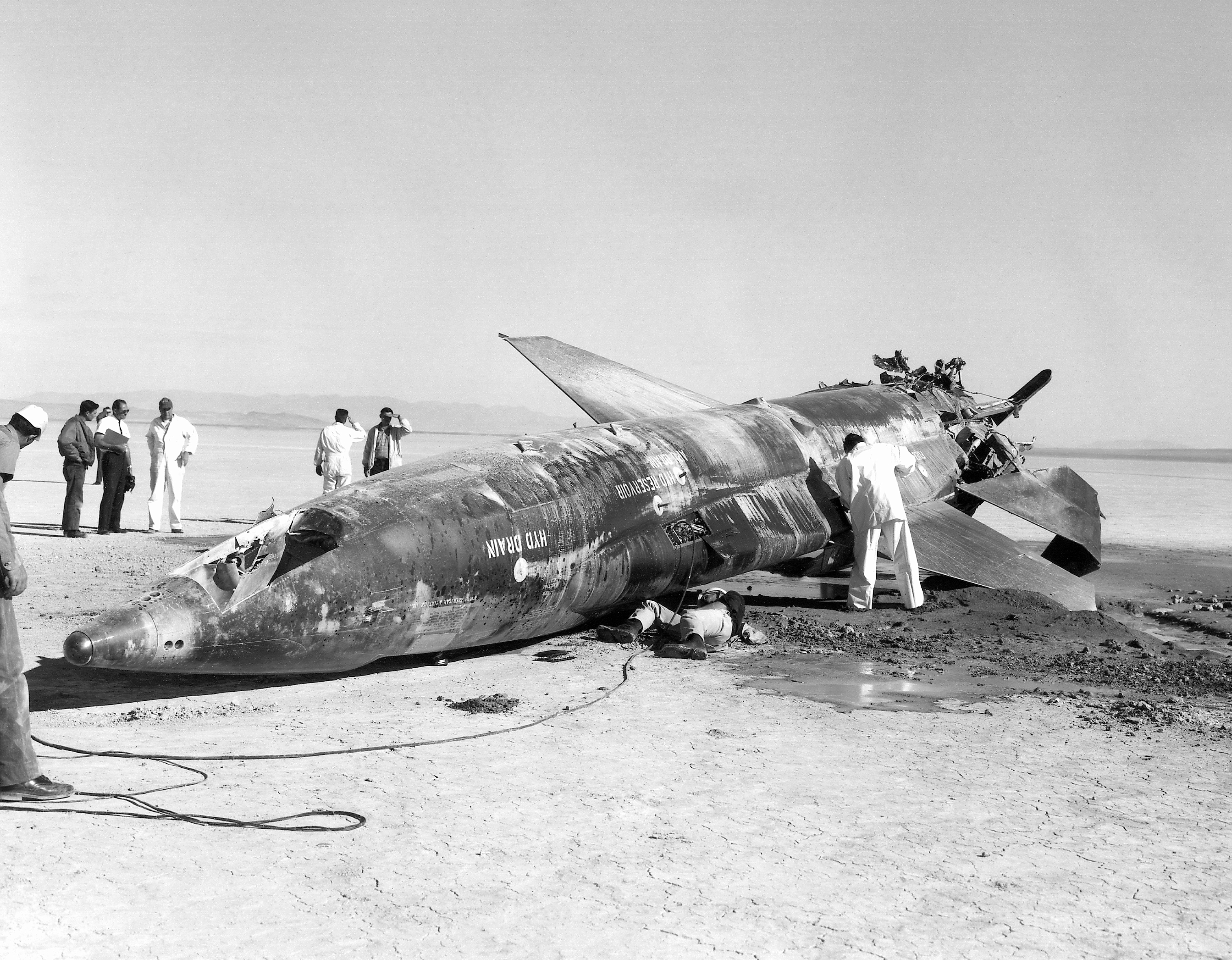
X-15-2 crash at Mud Lake, Nevada

The second plane, X-15-2, was rebuilt after a landing accident on 9 November 1962 which damaged the craft and injured its pilot, John McKay. The new plane renamed X-15A-2, had a new 28 inches (71 cm) fuselage extension to carry liquid hydrogen. It was lengthened by 2.4 feet (73 cm), had a pair of auxiliary fuel tanks attached beneath its fuselage and wings, and a complete heat-resistant ablative coating was added. It took flight for the first time on 25 June 1964. It reached its maximum speed of 4,520 miles per hour (7,274 km/h) in October 1967 with pilot William "Pete" Knight of the U.S. Air Force in control.

Five principal aircraft were used during the X-15 program: three X-15 planes and two modified "nonstandard" NB-52 bombers:

- X-15-1 – 56-6670, 81 free flights
- X-15-2 (later X-15A-2) – 56-6671, 31 free flights as X-15-2, 22 free flights as X-15A-2; 53 in total
- X-15-3 – 56-6672, 65 free flights, including the Flight 191 disaster
- NB-52A – 52-003 nicknamed The High and Mighty One (retired in October 1969)
- NB-52B – 52-008 nicknamed The Challenger, later Balls 8 (retired in November 2004)

Additionally, F-100, F-104 and F5D chase aircraft and C-130 and C-47 transports supported the program.

On 15 November 1967, U.S. Air Force test pilot Major Michael J. Adams was killed during X-15 Flight 191 when X-15-3, AF Ser. No. 56-6672, entered a hypersonic spin while descending, then oscillated violently as aerodynamic forces increased after re-entry. As his aircraft's flight control system operated the control surfaces to their limits, acceleration built to 15 g_{0} (150 m/s^{2}) vertical and 8.0 g_{0} (78 m/s^{2}) lateral. The airframe broke apart at 60,000 feet (18 km) altitude, scattering the X-15's wreckage across 50 square miles (130 km^{2}). On 8 May 2004, a monument was erected at the cockpit's locale, near Johannesburg, California. Major Adams was posthumously awarded Air Force astronaut wings for his final flight in X-15-3, which had reached an altitude of 50.4 miles (81.1 km). In 1991, his name was added to the Astronaut Memorial.

The 200th flight over Nevada was first scheduled for 21 November 1968, to be flown by William "Pete" Knight. Numerous technical problems and outbreaks of bad weather delayed this proposed flight six times, and it was permanently canceled on 20 December 1968. This X-15 (56–6670) was detached from the B-52 and then put into indefinite storage. The aircraft was later donated to the Smithsonian Air & Space Museum for display.

== Aircraft on display ==
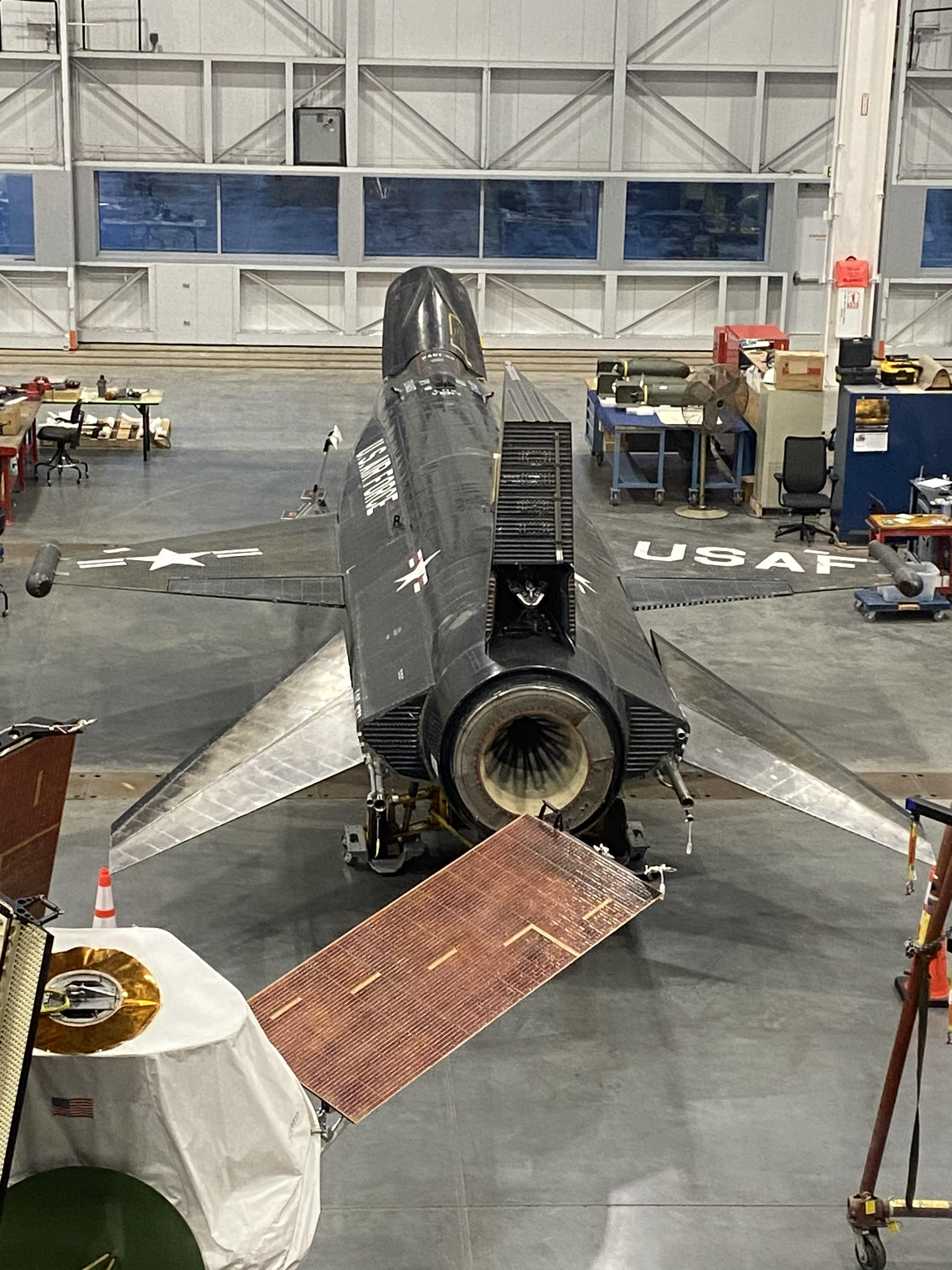
X-15-1 56–6670 in the Mary Baker Engen Restoration Hangar

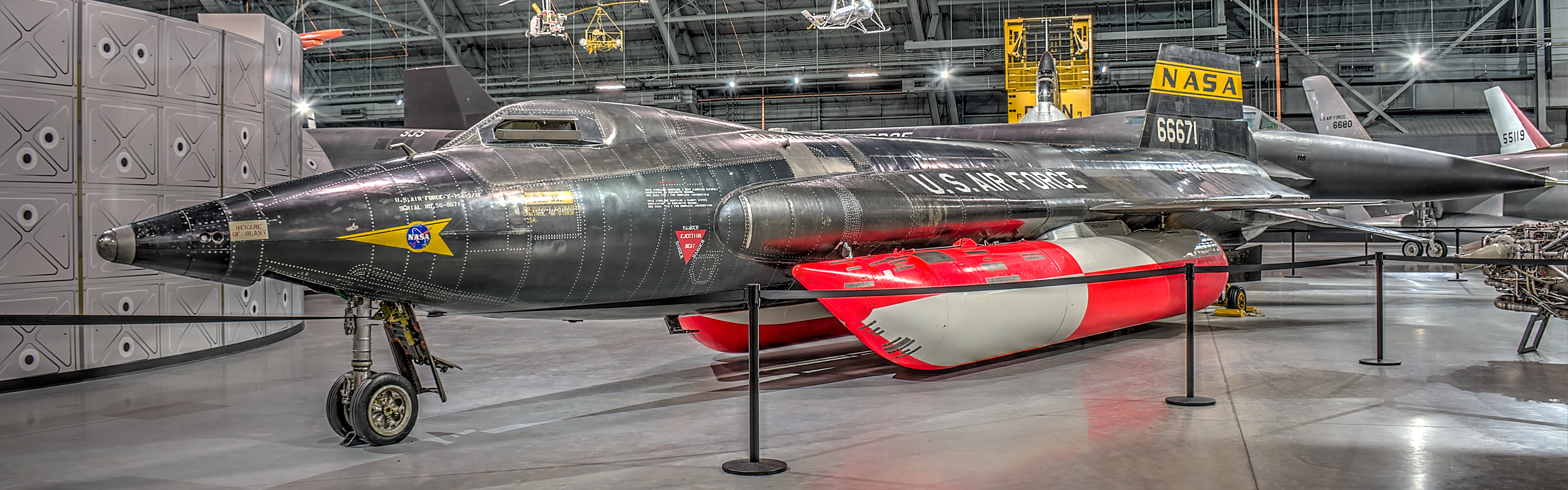
X-15 at the USAF Museum

Both surviving X-15s are currently on display at museums in the United States. In addition, three mockups and both B-52 Stratofortresses used as motherships are on display as well.

- X-15-1 (AF Ser. No. 56-6670) is on display in the National Air and Space Museum "Milestones of Flight" gallery, Washington, D.C.
- X-15A-2 (AF Ser. No. 56-6671) is at the National Museum of the United States Air Force, at Wright-Patterson Air Force Base, near Dayton, Ohio. It was retired to the museum in October 1969. The aircraft is displayed in the museum's Research and Development Gallery alongside other "X-planes", including the Bell X-1B and Douglas X-3 Stiletto.

=== Mockups ===
- Dryden Flight Research Center, Edwards AFB, California, United States (painted with AF Ser. No. 56-6672)
- Pima Air & Space Museum, adjacent to Davis-Monthan AFB, Tucson, Arizona (painted with AF Ser. No. 56-6671)
- Evergreen Aviation & Space Museum, McMinnville, Oregon (painted with AF Ser. No. 56-6672). A full-scale wooden mockup of the X-15, it is displayed along with one of the rocket engines.

=== Stratofortress mother ships ===
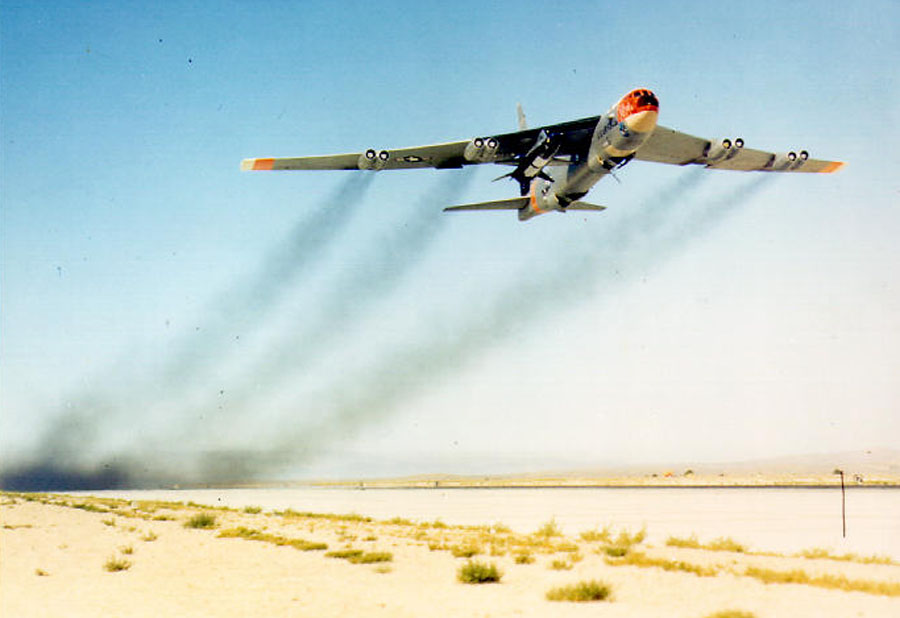
NB-52B Balls 8 takes off with an X-15

- NB-52A (AF Ser. No. 52-003) is displayed at the Pima Air & Space Museum adjacent to Davis–Monthan AFB in Tucson, Arizona. It launched the X-15-1 30 times, the X-15-2, 11 times, and the X-15-3 31 times (as well as the M2-F2 four times, the HL-10 11 times and the X-24A twice).
- NB-52B (AF Ser. No. 52-008) is on permanent display outside the north gate of Edwards AFB, California. It launched the majority of X-15 flights.

== Record flights ==
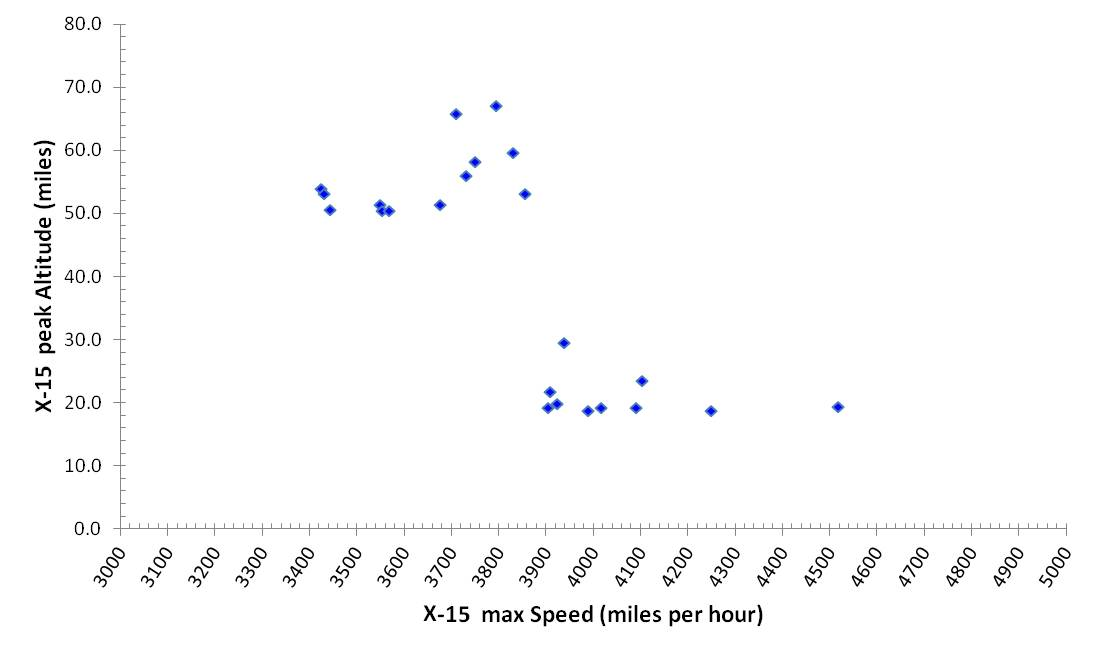
Key speed and altitude benchmarks of the X-15

=== Highest flights ===
During 13 of the 199 total X-15 flights, eight pilots flew above 264,000 feet (50.0 mi; 80 km), thereby qualifying as astronauts according to the US Armed Forces definition of the space border. All five Air Force pilots flew above 50 miles and were awarded military astronaut wings contemporaneously with their achievements, including Adams, who received the distinction posthumously following the flight 191 disaster. However the other three were NASA employees and did not receive a comparable decoration at the time. In 2004, the Federal Aviation Administration conferred its first-ever commercial astronaut wings on Mike Melvill and Brian Binnie, pilots of the commercial SpaceShipOne, another spaceplane with a flight profile comparable to the X-15's. Following this in 2005, NASA retroactively awarded its civilian astronaut wings to Dana (then living), and to McKay and Walker (posthumously). Forrest S. Petersen, the only Navy pilot in the X-15 program, never took the aircraft above the requisite altitude and thus never earned astronaut wings.

Of the thirteen flights, only two – flights 90 and 91, piloted by Walker – exceeded the 100 km (62 mi) altitude used by the FAI to denote the Kármán line.

X-15 flights higher than 50 miles
Flight	Date	Top speed (Note: The speed of sound in the atmosphere varies with altitude, so a comparatively lower airspeed (measured in mph or km/h) can correspond to a higher Mach number.)	Altitude	Pilot
Flight 91	22 August 1963	3,794 mph (6,106 km/h) (Mach 5.58)	67.1 mi (108.0 km)	Joseph A. Walker
Flight 90	19 July 1963	3,710 mph (5,971 km/h) (Mach 5.50)	65.9 mi (106.1 km)	Joseph A. Walker
Flight 62	17 July 1962	3,832 mph (6,167 km/h) (Mach 5.45)	59.6 mi (95.9 km)	Robert M. White
Flight 174	1 November 1966	3,750 mph (6,035 km/h) (Mach 5.46)	58.1 mi (93.5 km)	William H. "Bill" Dana
Flight 150	28 September 1965	3,732 mph (6,006 km/h) (Mach 5.33)	56.0 mi (90.1 km)	John B. McKay
Flight 87	27 June 1963	3,425 mph (5,512 km/h) (Mach 4.89)	54.0 mi (86.9 km)	Robert A. Rushworth
Flight 138	29 June 1965	3,432 mph (5,523 km/h) (Mach 4.94)	53.1 mi (85.5 km)	Joe H. Engle
Flight 190	17 October 1967	3,856 mph (6,206 km/h) (Mach 5.53)	53.1 mi (85.5 km)	William J. "Pete" Knight
Flight 77	17 January 1963	3,677 mph (5,918 km/h) (Mach 5.47)	51.5 mi (82.9 km)	Joseph A. Walker
Flight 143	10 August 1965	3,550 mph (5,713 km/h) (Mach 5.20)	51.3 mi (82.6 km)	Joe H. Engle
Flight 197	21 August 1968	3,443 mph (5,541 km/h) (Mach 5.01)	50.7 mi (81.6 km)	William H. "Bill" Dana
Flight 153	14 October 1965	3,554 mph (5,720 km/h) (Mach 5.08)	50.5 mi (81.3 km)	Joe H. Engle
Flight 191	15 November 1967	3,570 mph (5,745 km/h) (Mach 5.20)	50.4 mi (81.1 km)	Michael J. Adams^{†}

^{†} fatal

=== Fastest recorded flights ===
X-15 ten fastest flights
Flight	Date	Top speed	Altitude	Pilot
Flight 188	3 October 1967	4,520 mph (7,274 km/h) (Mach 6.70)	19.3 mi (31.1 km)	William J. "Pete" Knight
Flight 175	18 November 1966	4,250 mph (6,840 km/h) (Mach 6.33)	18.7 mi (30.1 km)	William J. "Pete" Knight
Flight 59	27 June 1962	4,104 mph (6,605 km/h) (Mach 5.92)	23.4 mi (37.7 km)	Joseph A. Walker
Flight 45	9 November 1961	4,093 mph (6,587 km/h) (Mach 6.04)	19.2 mi (30.9 km)	Robert M. White
Flight 97	5 December 1963	4,018 mph (6,466 km/h) (Mach 6.06)	19.1 mi (30.7 km)	Robert A. Rushworth
Flight 64	26 July 1962	3,989 mph (6,420 km/h) (Mach 5.74)	18.7 mi (30.1 km)	Neil A. Armstrong
Flight 137	22 June 1965	3,938 mph (6,338 km/h) (Mach 5.64)	29.5 mi (47.5 km)	John B. McKay
Flight 89	18 July 1963	3,925 mph (6,317 km/h) (Mach 5.63)	19.8 mi (31.9 km)	Robert A. Rushworth
Flight 86	25 June 1963	3,911 mph (6,294 km/h) (Mach 5.51)	21.2 mi (34.1 km)	Joseph A. Walker
Flight 105	29 April 1964	3,906 mph (6,286 km/h) (Mach 5.72)	19.2 mi (30.9 km)	Robert A. Rushworth

== Pilots ==
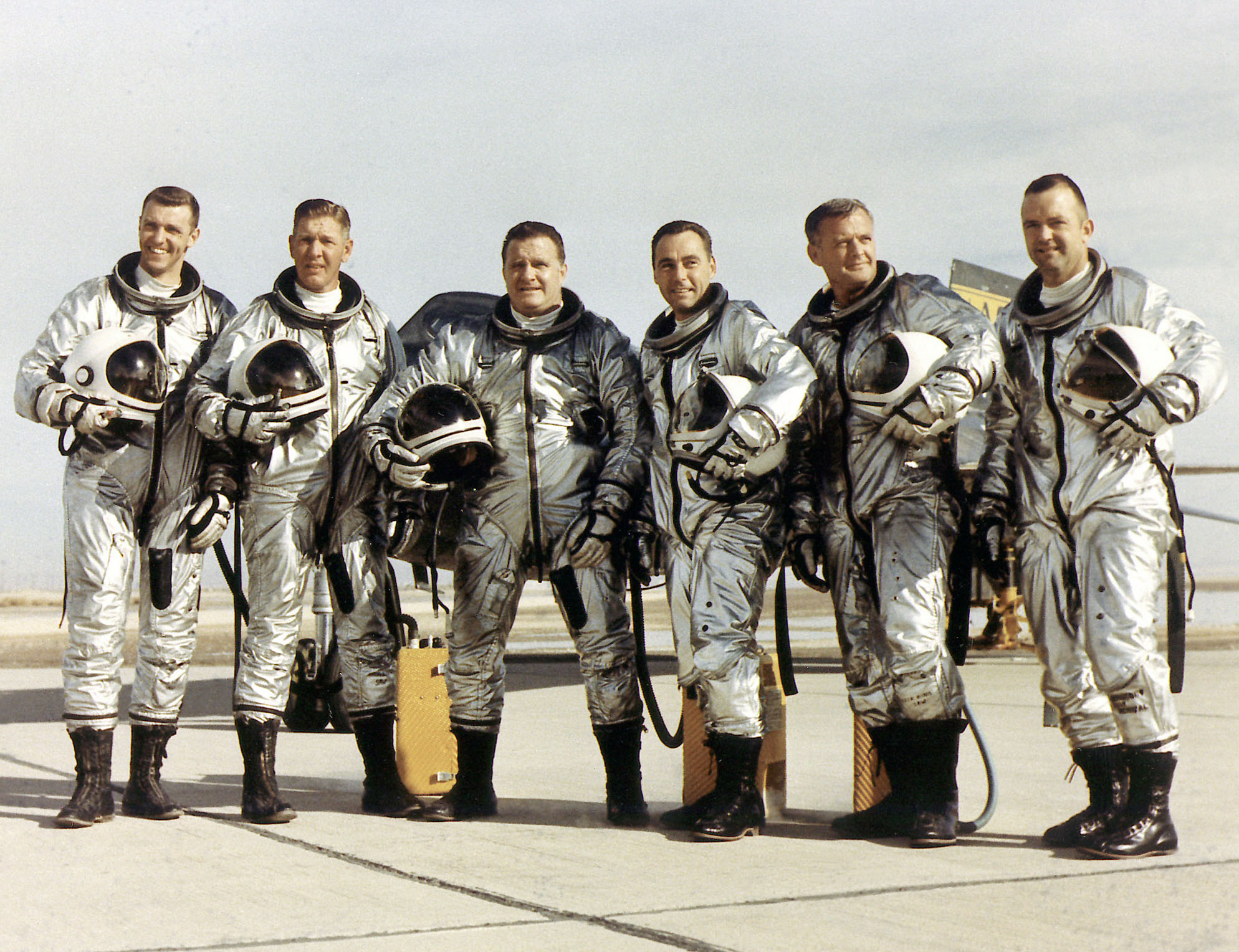
The X-15 flight crew, left to right: Air Force Captain Joseph H. Engle, Air Force Major Robert A. Rushworth, NASA pilot John B. "Jack" McKay, Air Force Major William J. "Pete" Knight, NASA pilot Milton O. Thompson, and NASA pilot William H. Dana.

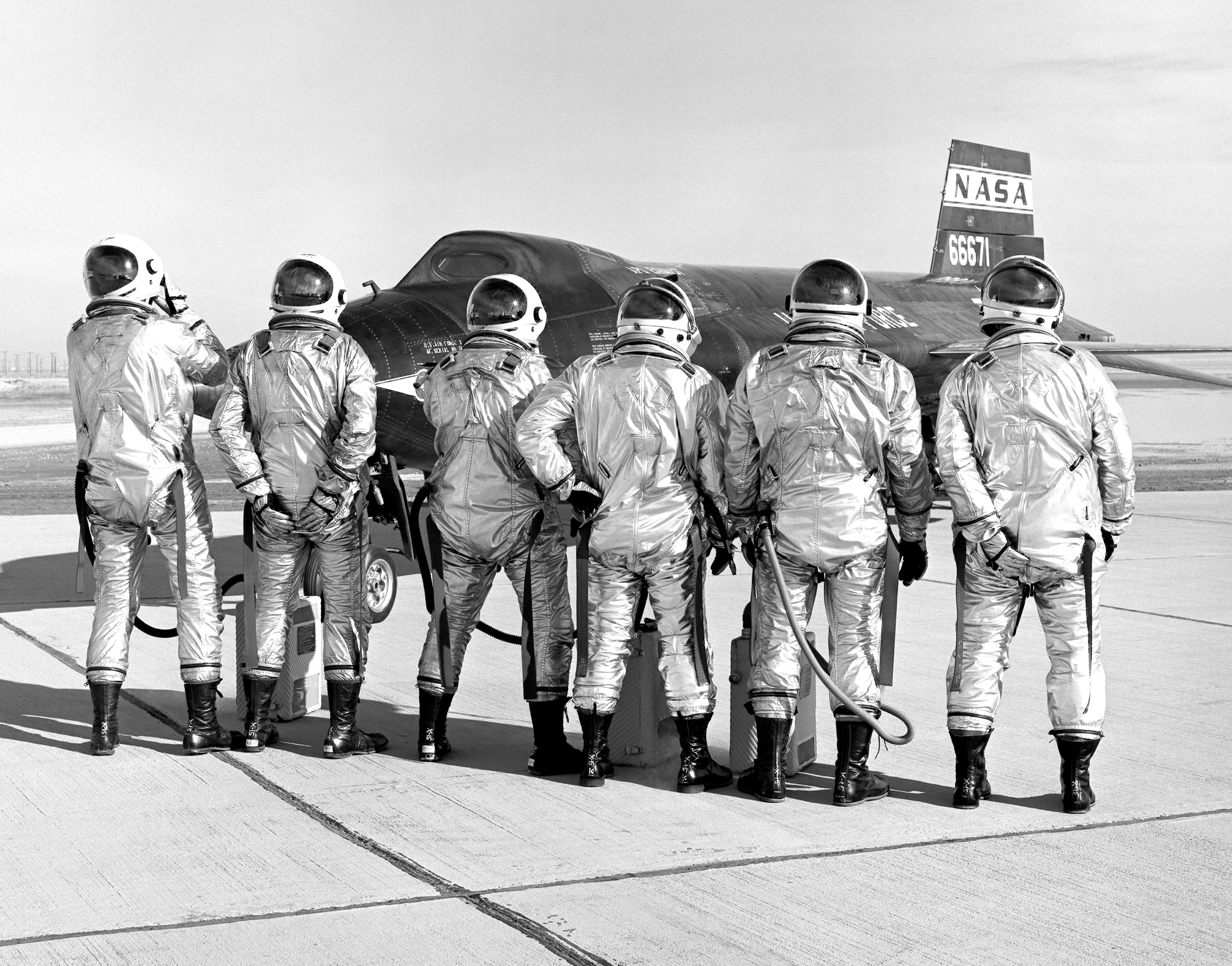
The X-15 pilots clown around in front of the #2 aircraft. From left to right: Joseph Engle, Robert Rushworth, John McKay, William Knight, Milton Thompson, and William Dana.

X-15 pilots and their achievements during the program
Pilot	Organization	Year assigned to X-15	Total flights	USAF space flights	FAI space flights	Max Mach	Max speed (mph)	Max altitude (miles)
Michael J. Adams^{†}	U.S. Air Force	1966	7	1	0	5.59	3,822	50.3
Neil A. Armstrong	NASA	1960	7	0	0	5.74	3,989	39.2
Scott Crossfield	North American Aviation	1959	14	0	0	2.97	1,959	15.3
William H. Dana	NASA	1965	16	2	0	5.53	3,897	58.1
Joe H. Engle	U.S. Air Force	1963	16	3	0	5.71	3,887	53.1
William J. Knight	U.S. Air Force	1964	16	1	0	6.7	4,519	53.1
John B. McKay	NASA	1960	29	1	0	5.65	3,863	55.9
Forrest S. Petersen	U.S. Navy	1958	5	0	0	5.3	3,600	19.2
Robert A. Rushworth	U.S. Air Force	1958	34	1	0	6.06	4,017	53.9
Milton O. Thompson	NASA	1963	14	0	0	5.48	3,723	40.5
Joseph A. Walker^{††}	NASA	1960	25	3	2	5.92	4,104	67.0
Robert M. White	U.S. Air Force	1957	16	1	0	6.04	4,092	59.6

^{†} Killed in the crash of X-15-3
^{††} Died in a group formation accident on 8 June 1966.

== Gallery ==
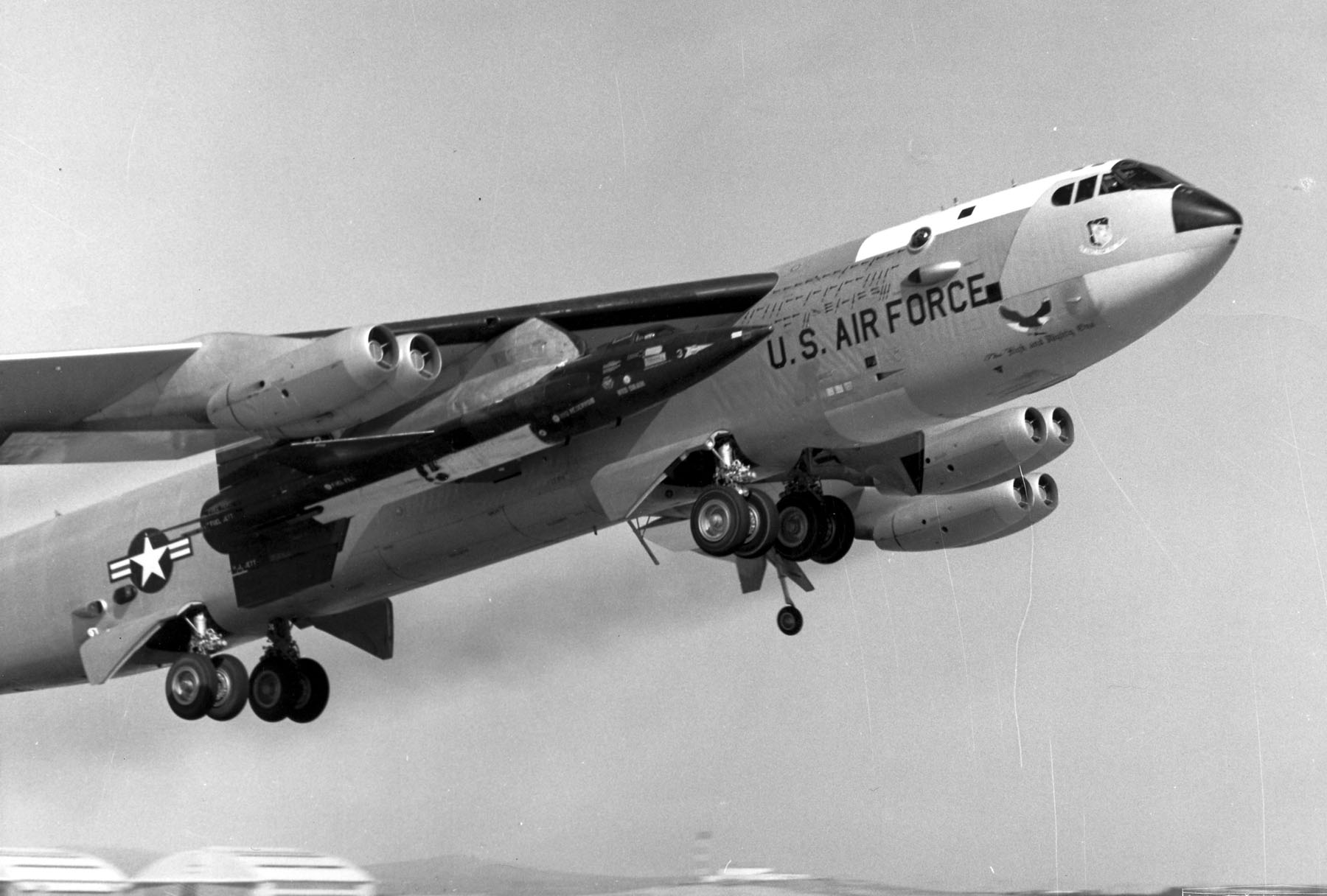
NB-52A (s/n 52-003), permanent test variant, carrying an X-15, with mission markings; horizontal X-15 silhouettes denote glide flights, diagonal silhouettes denote powered flights.

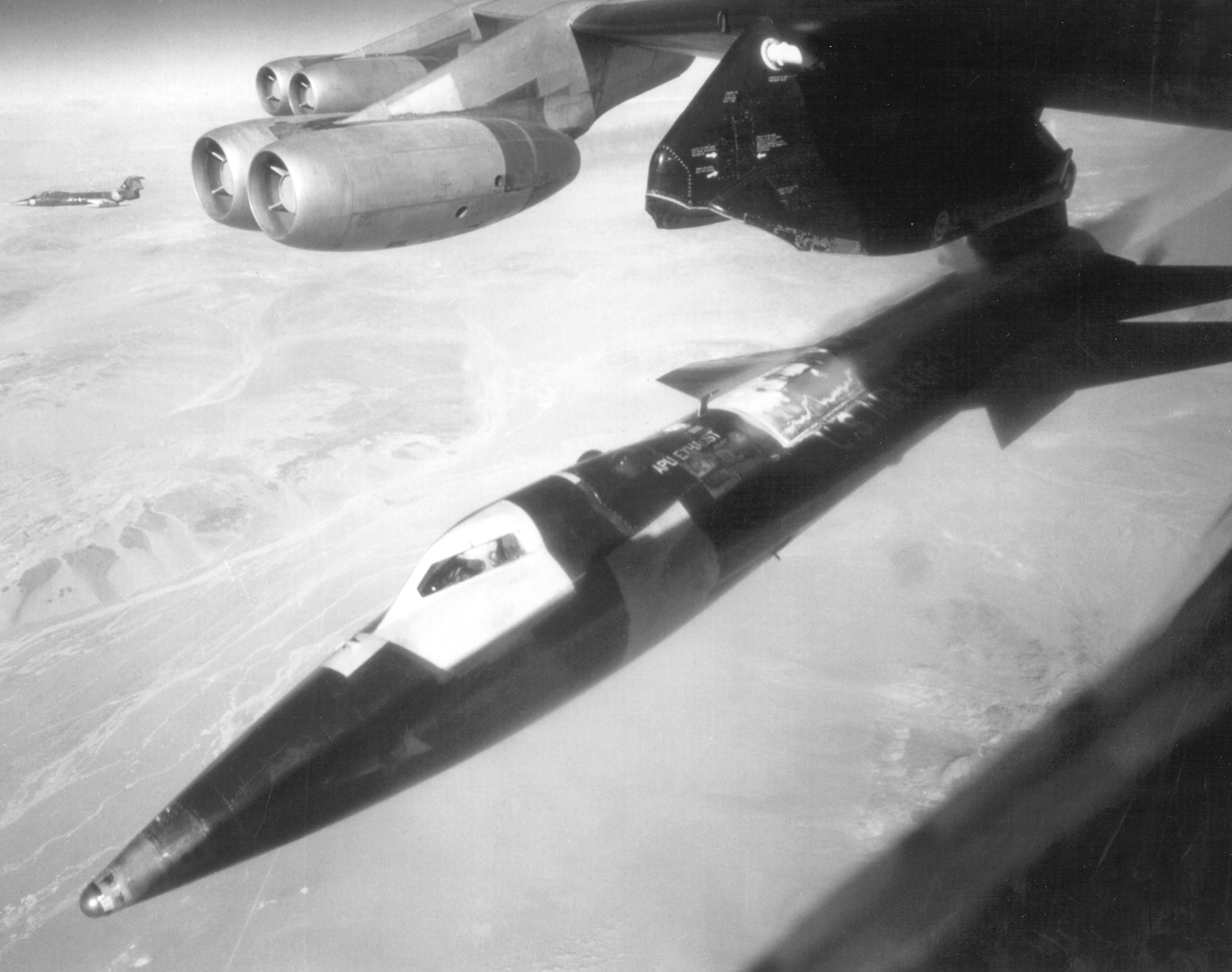
X-15 just after release

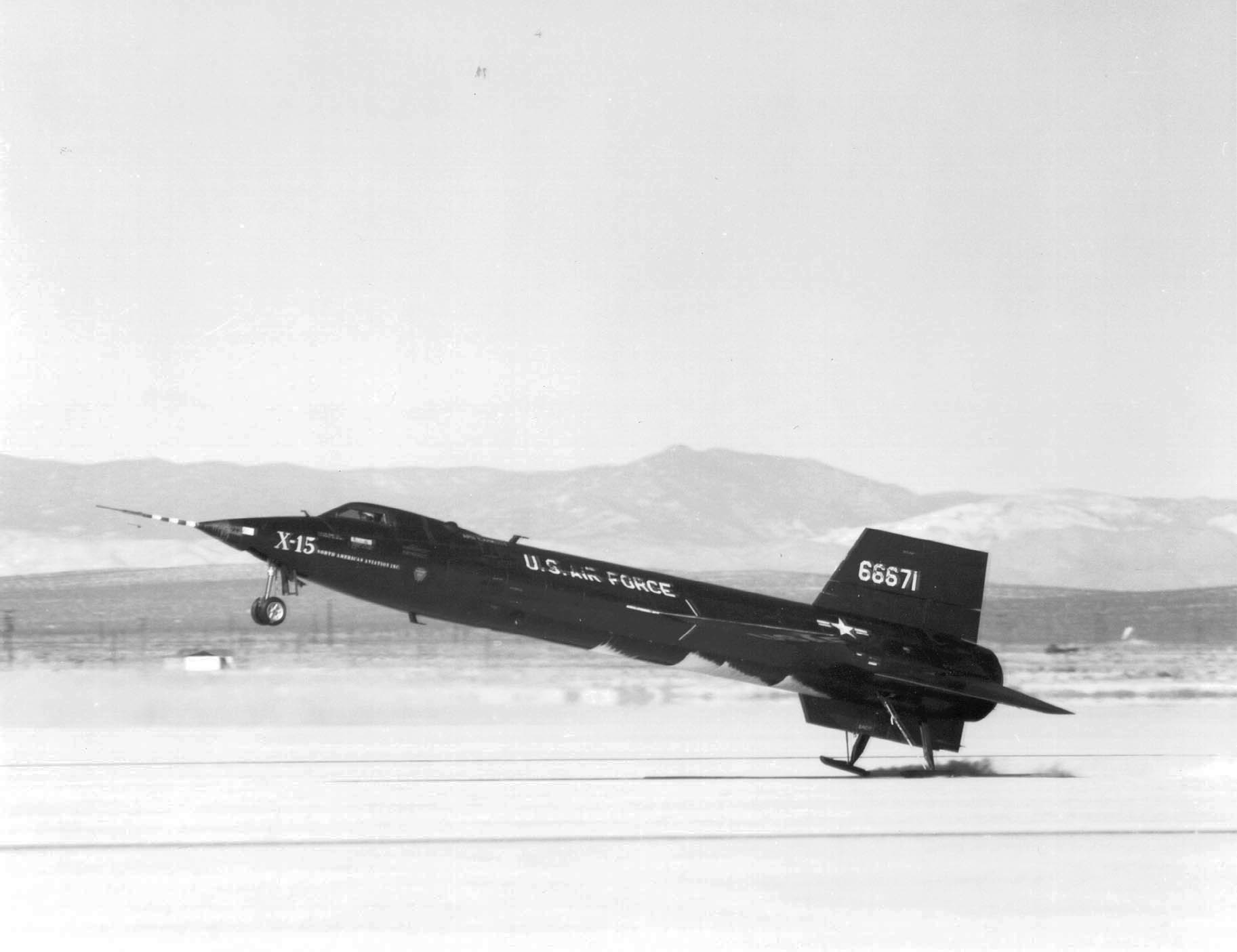
X-15 touching down on its skids, with the lower ventral fin jettisoned.

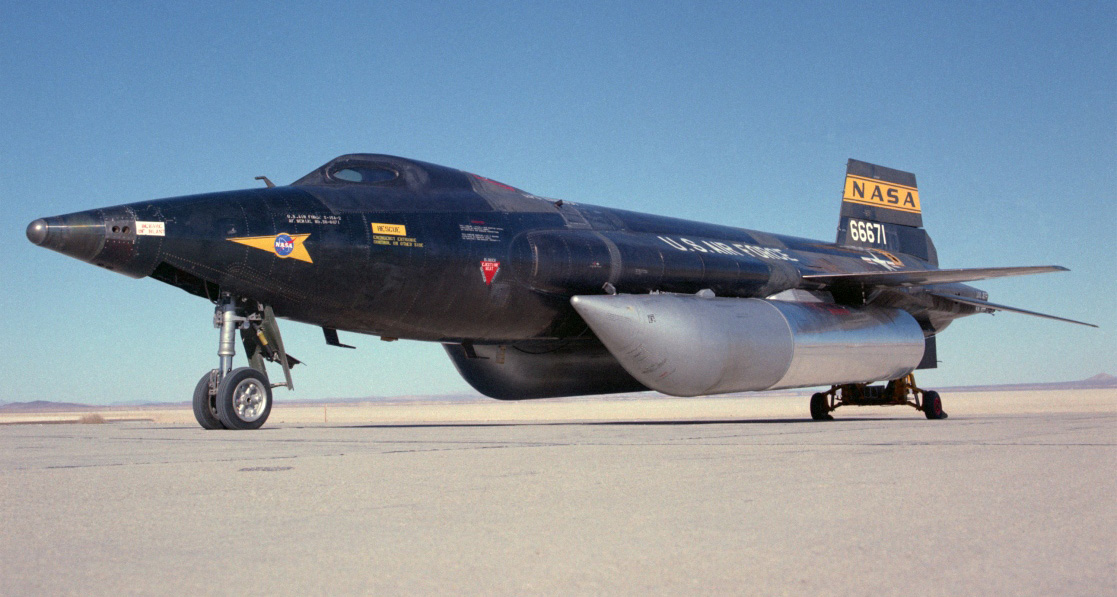
X-15A-2 (56–6671) with external fuel tanks

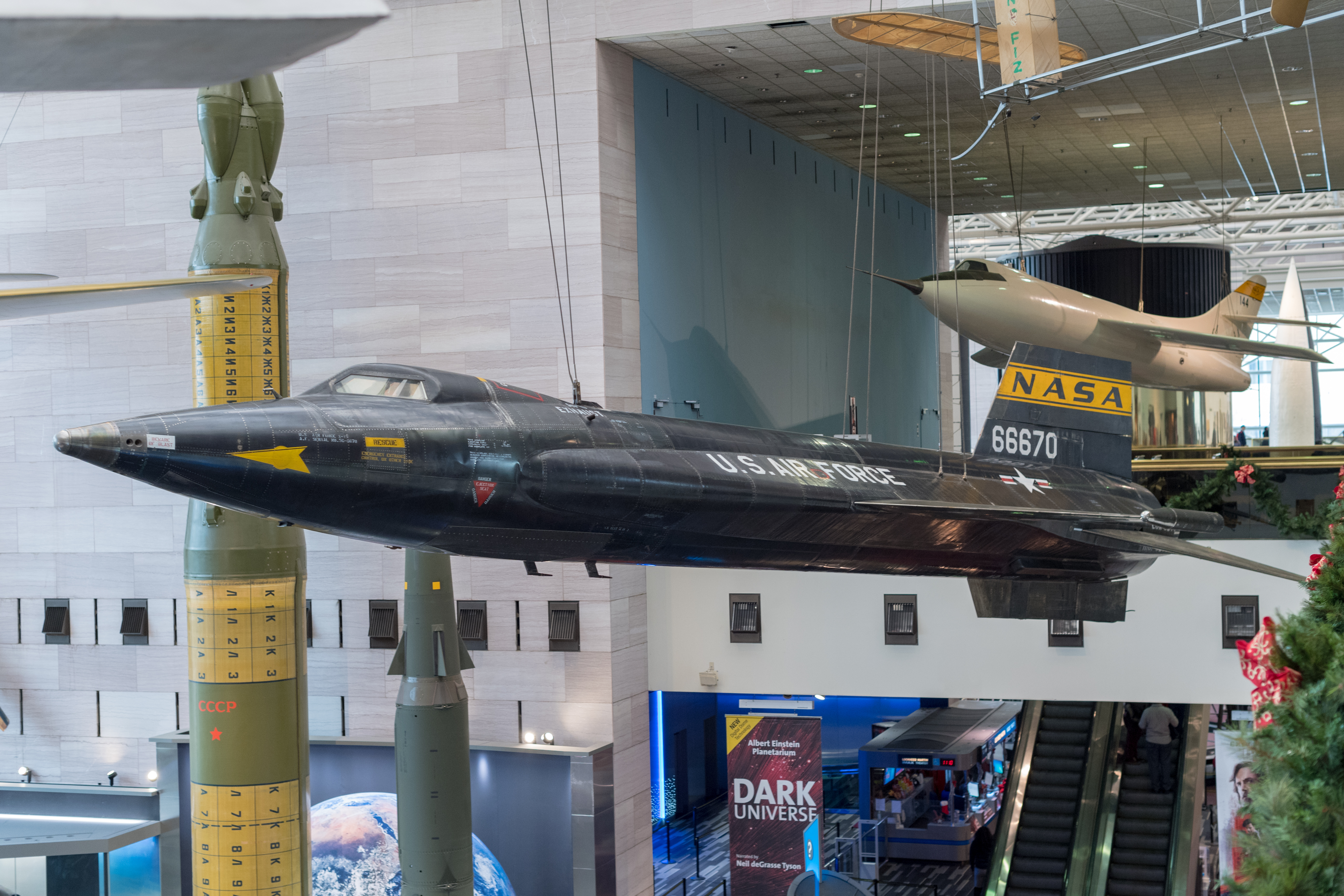
X-15-1 on display at the National Air and Space Museum

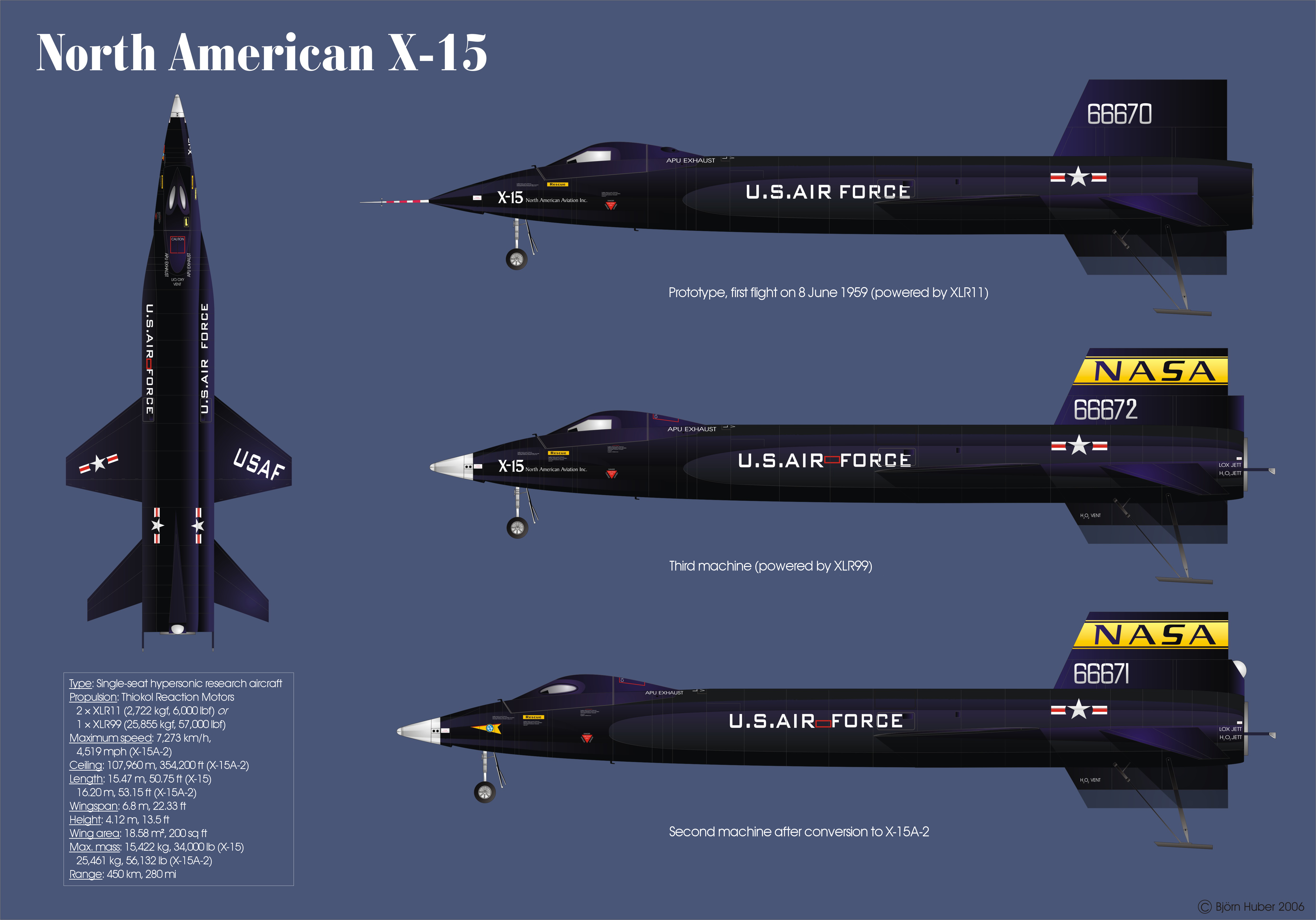
X-15 profiles

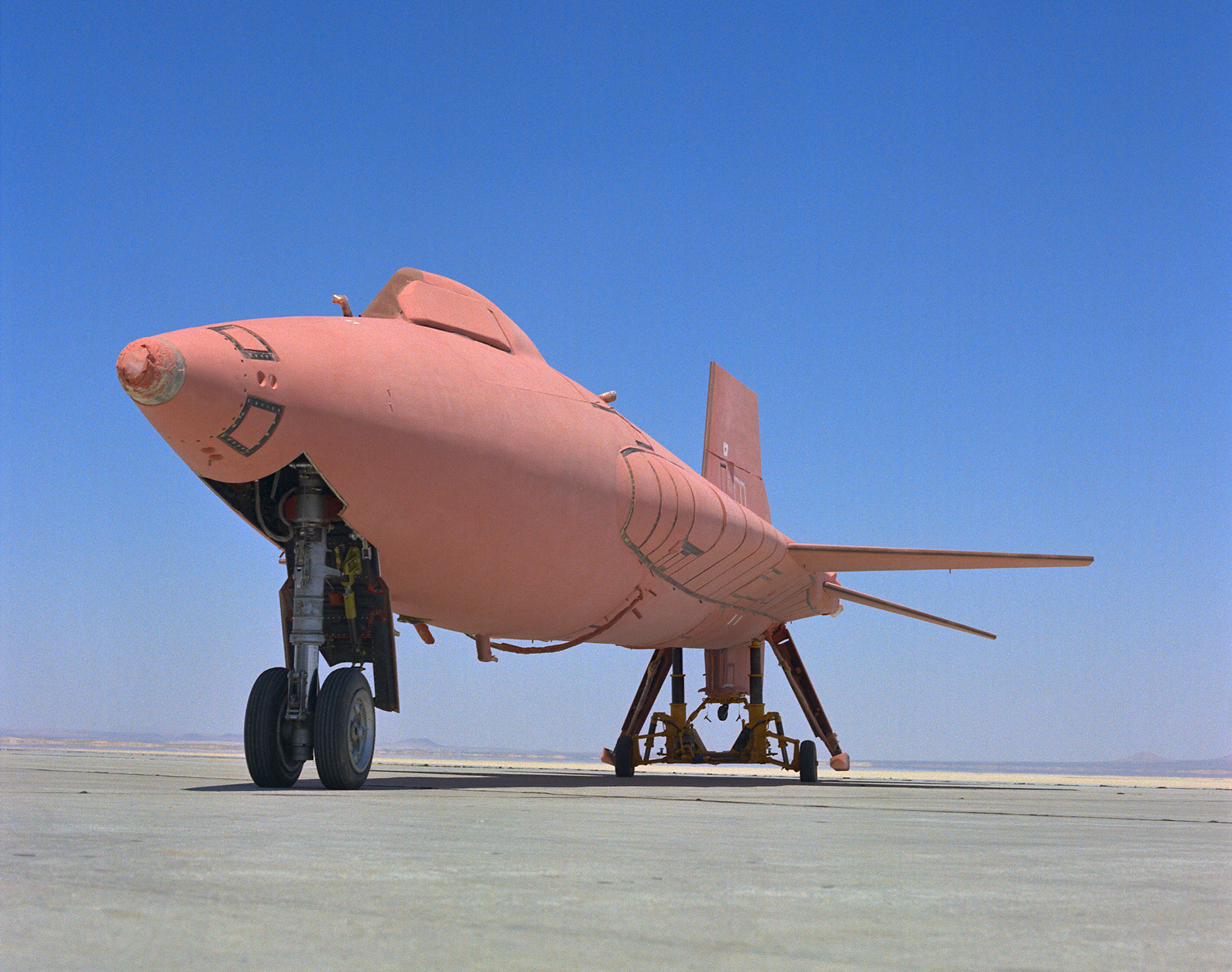
X-15A-2 with pink ablative coating before being covered with white sealant

== Specifications ==
Three view drawing

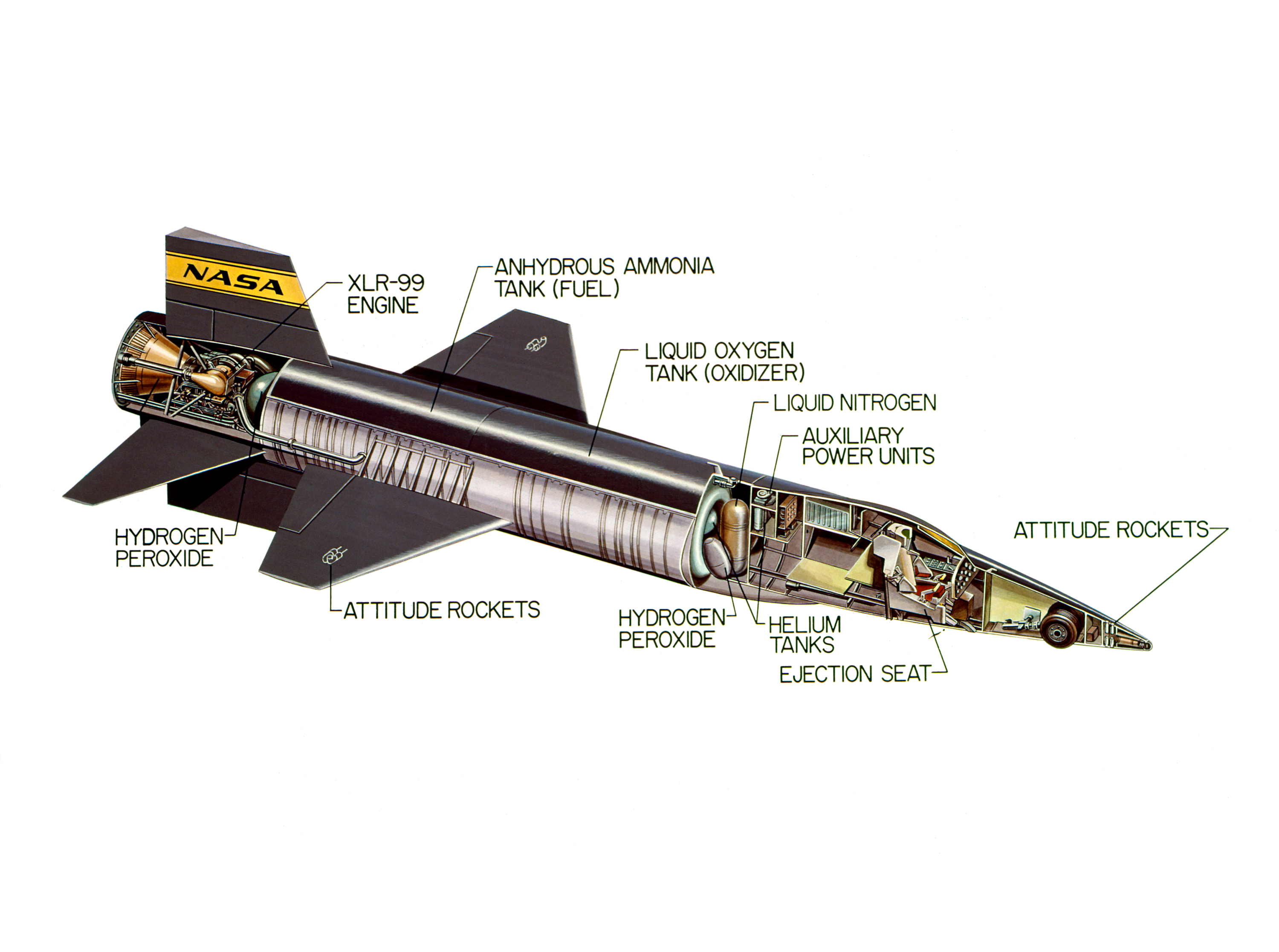
X-15 cutdrawing

Other configurations include the Reaction Motors XLR11 equipped X-15, and the long version.

Data from

General characteristics

- Crew: One
- Length: 49 ft 2 in (14.99 m) (Note: 56’ 1.5” With nose boom and XLR-11 rocket engine; 55’ 2.5” With nose boom and XLR-99 rocket engine; 50’ 1” With Q-Ball nose and XLR-11 rocket engine; 49’ 2” With Q-Ball nose and XLR-99 rocket engine; 51’ 11” Modified 66671 aircraft (X-15A-2))
- Wingspan: 22 ft 4 in (6.81 m) (Note: 22’ 4” Standard aircraft; 23’ 8” With wing tip pods)
- Height: 13 ft 1 in (3.99 m) (Note: 13’ 1” Standard aircraft; 11’ 6” Without lower ventral fin and with landing gear extended)
- Wing area: 200 sq ft (19 m^{2})
- Empty weight: 14,600 lb (6,622 kg) (Note: Burn-out weight: 14,500 lb Standard aircraft; Landing weight: 13,800 lb Standard aircraft)
- Gross weight: 33,500 lb (15,195 kg)
- Powerplant: 1 × Reaction Motors XLR99-RM-2 liquid-fuelled rocket engine, 70,400 lbf (313 kN) thrust

Performance

- Maximum speed: 4,520 mph (7,270 km/h, 3,930 kn)
- Range: 280 mi (450 km, 240 nmi)
- Service ceiling: 354,330 ft (108,000 m)
- Rate of climb: 60,000 ft/min (300 m/s)
- Thrust/weight: 2.07

== See also ==
- SpaceShipOne
- SpaceShipTwo

Aircraft of comparable role, configuration, and era

- Bell X-2
- Douglas D-558-2 Skyrocket

Related lists

- List of rocket aircraft
- List of X-15 flights
- List of spaceflight-related accidents and incidents

== Bibliography ==
- Davies, Mark, ed. (2003). The Standard Handbook for Aeronautical and Astronautical Engineers. New York: McGraw-Hill. pp. 8–28. ISBN 978-0-07-136229-0.
- Evans, Michelle (2013a). The X-15 Rocket Plane, Flying the First Wings into Space. Lincoln, Nebraska: University of Nebraska Press. ISBN 978-0-8032-2840-5.
- Evans, Michelle (2013b). "The X-15 Rocket Plane: Flying the First Wings Into Space - Flight Log" (PDF). Mach 25 Media.
- Godwin, Robert, ed. (2001). X-15: The NASA Mission Reports. Burlington, Ontario: Apogee Books. ISBN 1-896522-65-3.
- Hallion, Richard P. (1978). "Saga of the Rocket Ships". In Green, William; Swanborough, Gordon (eds.). Air Enthusiast Six. Bromley, Kent, UK: Pilot Press.
- Jenkins, Dennis R. (2001). Space Shuttle: The History of the National Space Transportation System: The First 100 Missions (3rd ed.). Stillwater, Minnesota: Voyageur Press. ISBN 0-9633974-5-1.
- Jenkins, Dennis R.; Landis, Tony; Miller, Jay (June 2003). American X-Vehicles: An Inventory – X-1 to X-50 (PDF). Monographs in Aerospace History No. 31. NASA. OCLC 68623213. SP-2003-4531. Archived from the original (PDF) on 25 April 2020.
- Jenkins, Dennis R.; Dana, William H. (2010). X-15: Extending the Frontiers of Flight. NASA. ISBN 978-0-16-079285-4. SP-2007-562.
- Käsmann, Ferdinand C. W. (1999). Die schnellsten Jets der Welt: Weltrekord-Flugzeuge [The Fastest Jets in the World: World Record Aircraft] (in German). Kolpingring, Germany: Aviatic Verlag. ISBN 3-925505-26-1.
- Price, A. B. (12 January 1968). Design Report – Thermal Protection System, X-15A-2. Denver, Colorado: Martin Marietta Corporation. NASA CR-82003.
- Proceedings of the X-15 First Flight 30th Anniversary Celebration (PDF). NASA. January 1991. NASA CP-3105.
- Thompson, Milton O. (1992). At the Edge of Space: The X-15 Flight Program. Washington, D.C.: Smithsonian Institution Press. ISBN 1-56098-107-5.
- Tregaskis, Richard (2000). X-15 Diary: The Story of America's First Space Ship. Lincoln, Nebraska: iUniverse. ISBN 0-595-00250-1.
- United States Air Force Museum Guidebook. Wright-Patterson AFB, Ohio: Air Force Museum Foundation. 1975.
- Watts, Joe D. (October 1968). Flight Experience With Shock Impingement and Interference Heating on the X-15-2 Research Airplane (PDF). NASA. NASA-TM-X-1669.
