= X-15 Flight 62 =

1962 American crewed sub-orbital spaceflight

Flight 62
- Mission type: Test flight
- Operator: USAF/NASA
- Apogee: 95.9 kilometers (59.6 mi)

Spacecraft properties
- Spacecraft: X-15
- Manufacturer: North American

Crew
- Crew size: 1
- Members: Robert Michael White

Start of mission
- Launch date: July 17, 1962 UTC

End of mission
- Landing date: July 17, 1962 UTC
- Landing site: Rogers Dry Lake, Edwards

Flight 62 of the North American X-15 was a sub-orbital spaceflight conducted by NASA and the US Air Force on 17 July 1962. The X-15 was piloted by astronaut Robert Michael White to an altitude of 95.9 km (59.6 mi) surpassing the U.S. definition of space. Thus it became the first spaceflight of a spaceplane and a reusable spacecraft. The X-15 was also NASA's first space vehicle (the Mercury capsule flew into space first, but the X-15 was airborne before Big Joe 1). The Flight landed at Edwards Air Force Base. With this White was the first test pilot qualifying for his astronaut wings.

Position	Astronaut
Pilot	(United States) Robert Michael White; First spaceflight
