= William J. Knight =

American test pilot and politician (1929–2004)

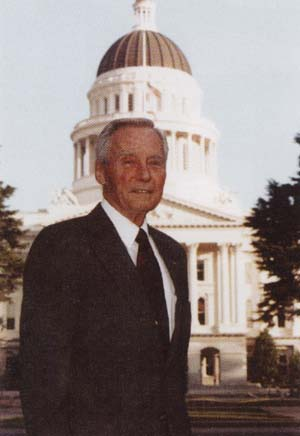

Member of the California Senate from the 17th district
- In office December 2, 1996 – May 7, 2004
- Preceded by: Don Rogers
- Succeeded by: George Runner

Member of the California State Assembly from the 36th district
- In office December 7, 1992 - December 2, 1996
- Preceded by: Tom McClintock
- Succeeded by: George Runner

Personal details
- Born: William J Knight; November 18, 1929 Noblesville, Indiana, U.S.
- Died: May 7, 2004 (aged 74) Los Angeles, California, U.S.
- Party: Republican
- Children: Steve Knight, 2 other
- Other name: Pete Knight
- Education: Butler University; Purdue University; Air Force Institute of Technology, B.S. 1958
- Occupation: Test pilot
- Space career

USAF astronaut
- Rank: Colonel, USAF
- Selection: 1960 Dyna-Soar Group 1
- Missions: X-15 Flight 190; X-15 Flight 188

William John "Pete" Knight (November 18, 1929 – May 7, 2004) (Col, USAF) was an American aeronautical engineer, politician, Vietnam War combat pilot, test pilot, and astronaut. He was one of twelve pilots who flew the North American X-15, an experimental spaceplane jointly operated by the U.S. Air Force and NASA. He was also selected for participation in the X-20 Dyna-Soar program.

On October 3, 1967, Knight piloted X-15 Flight 188, the program's fastest flight. Flying at a maximum Mach of 6.7 and a maximum speed of 4,520 mph (7,274 km/h), he set a speed record for flight in a winged, powered aircraft. The flight was made in the X-15A-2, the second of three planes in the X-15 fleet.

Two weeks later on October 17, Knight flew X-15 Flight 190, reaching a maximum altitude above 50 miles. This qualified him as an astronaut according to the United States definition of the boundary of space. However, this altitude did not surpass the Kármán line, the internationally accepted boundary of 100 kilometers (62 miles).

Knight went on to have a political career in both Palmdale city politics as well as California state level politics. He served four years in the California State Assembly followed by seven and a half years in the California State Senate, dying in office. In spite of having both a brother and a son who are LGBT, Knight's political career is most remembered for his anti-LGBT work, having authored the ballot proposition that became known as the Knight initiative.

== Early life and education ==
Knight was born November 18, 1929, in Noblesville, Indiana, to parents William T. Knight (1906–1968) and Mary Emma Knight (1909–1959). Following high school, Knight attended Butler University and Purdue University. He graduated with a Bachelor of Science degree in Aeronautical Engineering from the U.S. Air Force Institute of Technology in 1958.

== Personal ==
Knight was married to Helena Stone and they had three sons, Steve, Peter, and David. Helena predeceased Knight. Knight remarried and at his death in 2004 he was survived by his widow Gail, a brother, three sons, four stepchildren and 15 grandchildren.

== Air Force career ==
Knight joined the United States Air Force in 1951. While only a second lieutenant, he flew an F-89 at the National Air Show in 1954 and won the Allison Jet Trophy.

Starting in 1958, following his graduation from both U.S. Air Force Institute of Technology and the Air Force Experimental Flight Test Pilot School (Class 58C), Knight served as a test pilot at Edwards Air Force Base, California. He was a project test pilot for the F-100 Super Sabre, F-101 Voodoo, F-104 Starfighter and later, T-38 Talon and F-5 Freedom Fighter test programs. In 1960, he was one of six test pilots selected to fly the X-20 Dyna-Soar, which was slated to become the first winged orbital space vehicle capable of lifting reentries and conventional landings. After the X-20 program was canceled in 1963, he completed the astronaut training curriculum through the Aerospace Research Pilot School (Class 63A) at Edwards AFB and was selected to fly the North American X-15.

He had more than his share of eventful flights in the X-15. While climbing through 107,000 feet (33,000 m) at Mach 4.17 on June 29, 1967, he suffered a total electrical failure and all onboard systems shut down. After reaching a maximum altitude of 173,000 feet (53,000 m), he calmly set up a visual approach and, resorting to old-fashioned "seat-of-the-pants" flying, he glided down to a safe emergency landing at Mud Lake, Nevada. For his remarkable feat of airmanship that day, he earned a Distinguished Flying Cross.

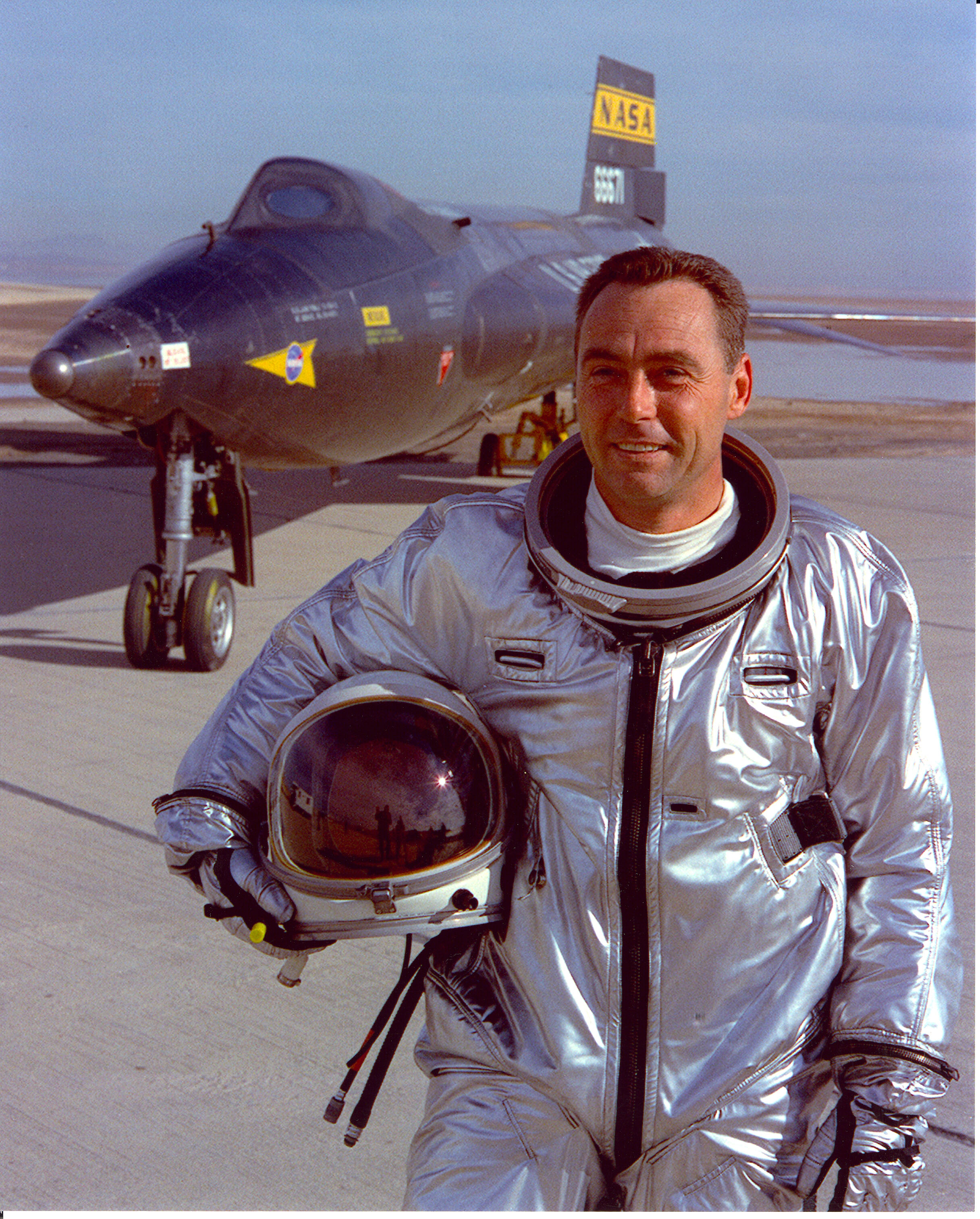
Maj. William "Pete" Knight with the X-15

On October 3, 1967, Knight set a world aircraft speed record for manned aircraft by piloting the X-15A-2 to 4,520 miles per hour (7,274 km/h) (Mach 6.70), a record that still stands today. During 16 flights in the aircraft, Knight also became one of only five pilots to earn their Astronaut Wings by flying an airplane in space, reaching an altitude of 280,500 feet (85,500 m).

After nearly ten years of test flying at Edwards AFB, he went to Southeast Asia in 1968, where he completed a total of 253 combat missions in the F-100 during the Vietnam War. Following his combat tour, he served as test director during development of the F-15 Eagle at Wright Patterson Air Force Base in Dayton, Ohio. He also was the program director for the International Fighter (F-5) Program at Wright-Patterson. In 1979, he returned to Edwards AFB, and served as a test pilot for the F-16 Fighting Falcon.

After 32 years of service and more than 6,000 hours in the cockpits of more than 100 different aircraft, he retired from the U.S. Air Force as a colonel in 1982.

== Political career ==
In 1984, he was elected to the city council of Palmdale, California, and four years later became the city's first elected mayor. In 1992, he was elected to serve in the California State Assembly representing the 36th District. He served in the State Senate representing the 17th District from 1996 until his death on May 7, 2004. Knight's youngest son, Steve Knight served as assemblyman for the 36th Assembly District from 2008 to 2012, the seat previously held by his father.

=== Proposition 22 ===
Knight's brother and son came out as gay, and Knight pursued anti-LGBT legislation in his political work. During his term in the Senate, Knight gained statewide attention in 2000 as the author of Proposition 22, a.k.a. the "Knight Initiative", the purpose of which was to ban same-sex marriage: "Only marriage between a man and a woman is valid or recognized in California." The proposition passed with 61.4% approval and 38.6% against. On March 9, 2004, Knight's son, David Knight, who is gay, married his partner during the period when San Francisco registered same-sex marriages in defiance of state law. These marriages were nullified by the California Supreme Court in 2004. The Court later found Proposition 22 to be unconstitutional in In re Marriage Cases (2008).

Knight's younger brother died of AIDS-related complications in 1995 at age 60. Of his younger brother's homosexuality, Knight said "We never talked about it."

== Awards and honors ==
- Legion of Merit
- Distinguished Flying Cross
- Air Medal
- Harmon Trophy, 1967
- AIAA Octave Chanute Award, 1968
- Enshrined in the National Aviation Hall of Fame in 1988.
- Inducted into the Aerospace Walk of Honor in 1990.
- Inducted into the International Space Hall of Fame in 1998.

In the city of Palmdale, Pete Knight High School was opened in his memory. The school began its first year in the school year of 2003–2004 and celebrated its first graduating class in 2007.

== Bibliography ==
- Thompson, Milton O. (1992) At The Edge Of Space: The X-15 Flight Program, Smithsonian Institution Press, Washington and London. ISBN 1-56098-107-5
- Dr. James Young. "Maj. William "Pete" Knight".

Political offices
| Preceded by Cathie Wright | California State Assemblyman; 36th District; December 7, 1992 – November 30, 1996 | Succeeded by George Runner |
| Preceded by Don Rogers | California State Senator; 17th District; December 2, 1996 – May 7, 2004 | Succeeded by George Runner |
