= X-15 Flight 188 =

1967 flight operated by the US Air Force and NASA

Flight 188
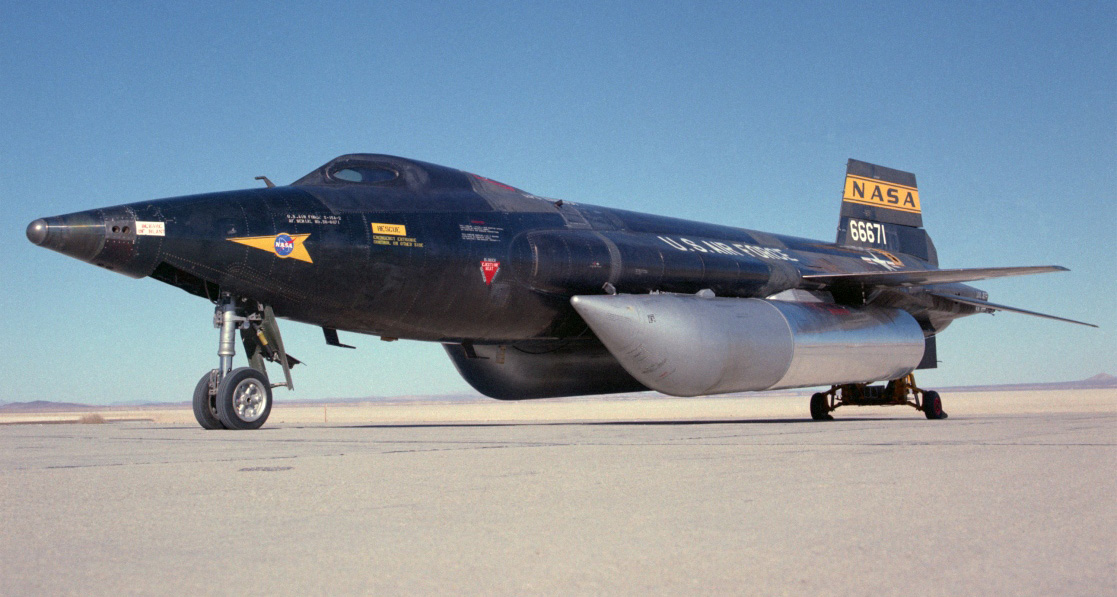
- North American X-15A-2 with external tanks, before heat shield paint
- Mission type: Test flight, airspeed record attempt
- Operator: USAF/NASA
- Range: 342.79 km (213 miles)
- Apogee: 58.4 kilometers (36.3 mi)

Spacecraft properties
- Spacecraft: X-15-A2
- Manufacturer: North American

Crew
- Crew size: 1
- Members: William J. Knight

Start of mission
- Launch date: October 3, 1967 UTC

End of mission
- Landing date: October 3, 1967 UTC
- Landing site: Rogers Dry Lake, Edwards
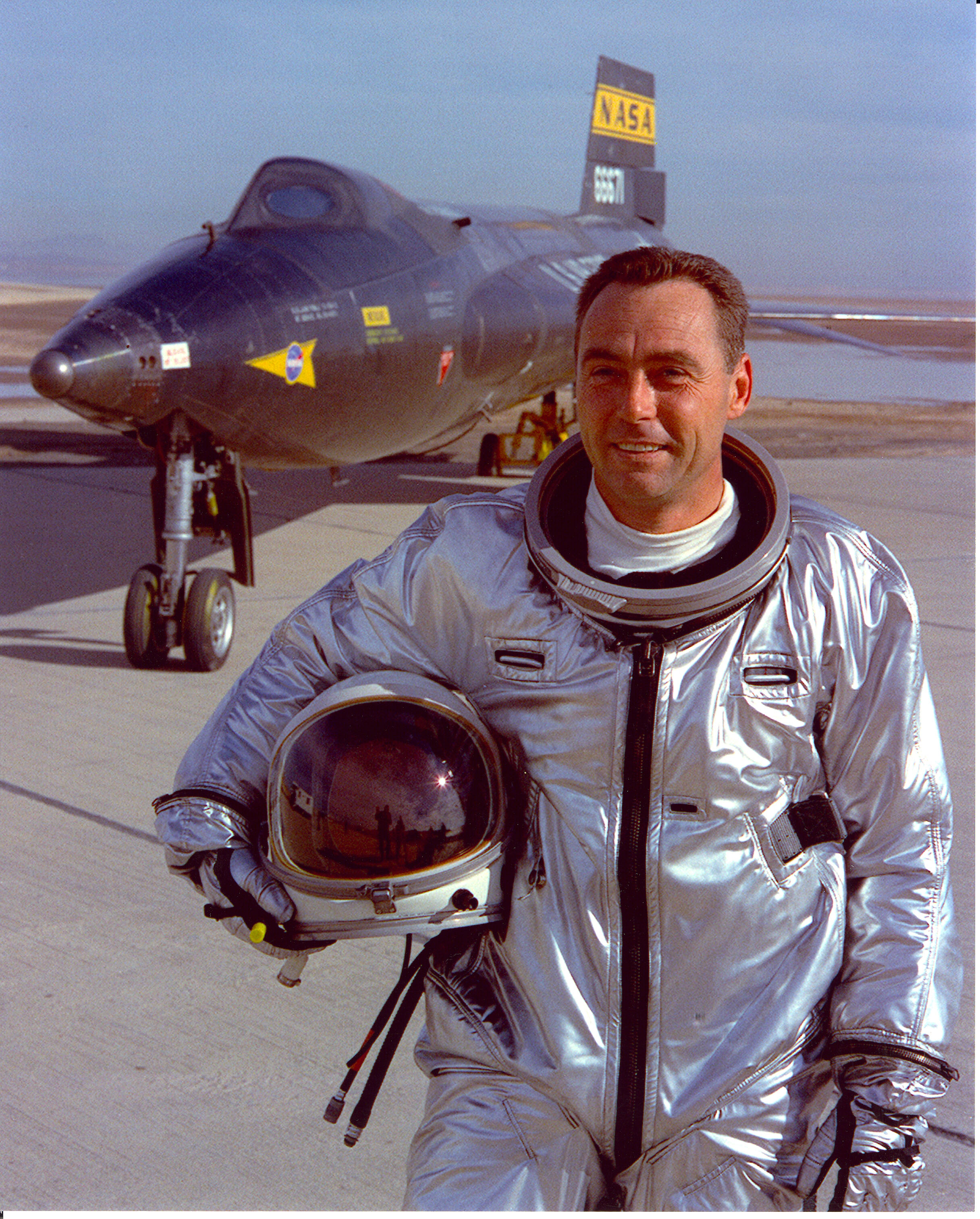
- William J. Knight with an X-15

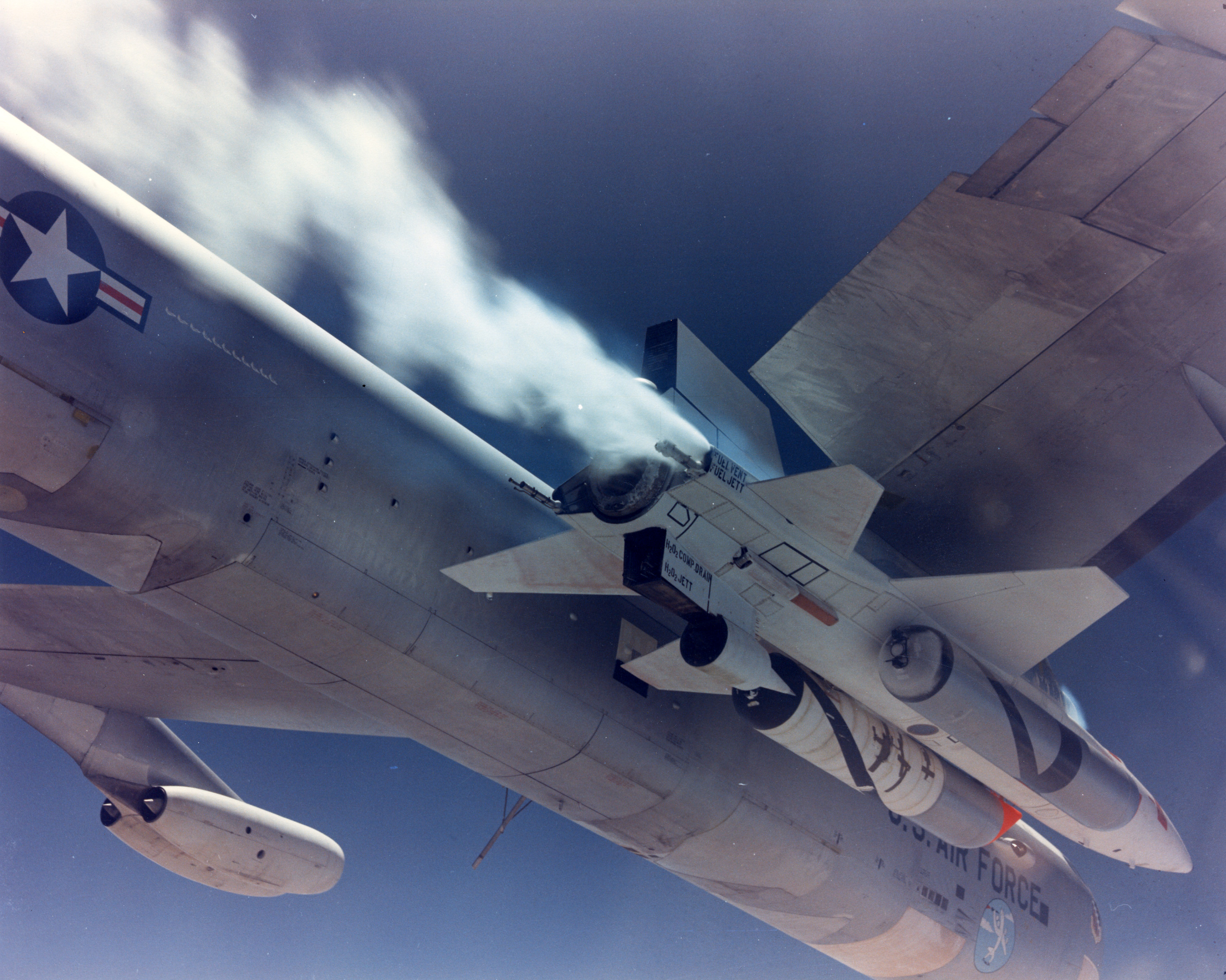
North American X-15A-2 with external tanks on Balls 8 on October 3, 1967

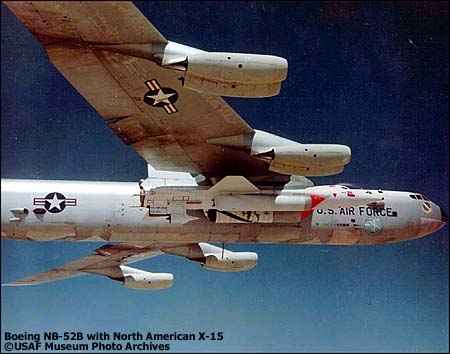
North American X-15A-2 on Balls 8 on October 3, 1967

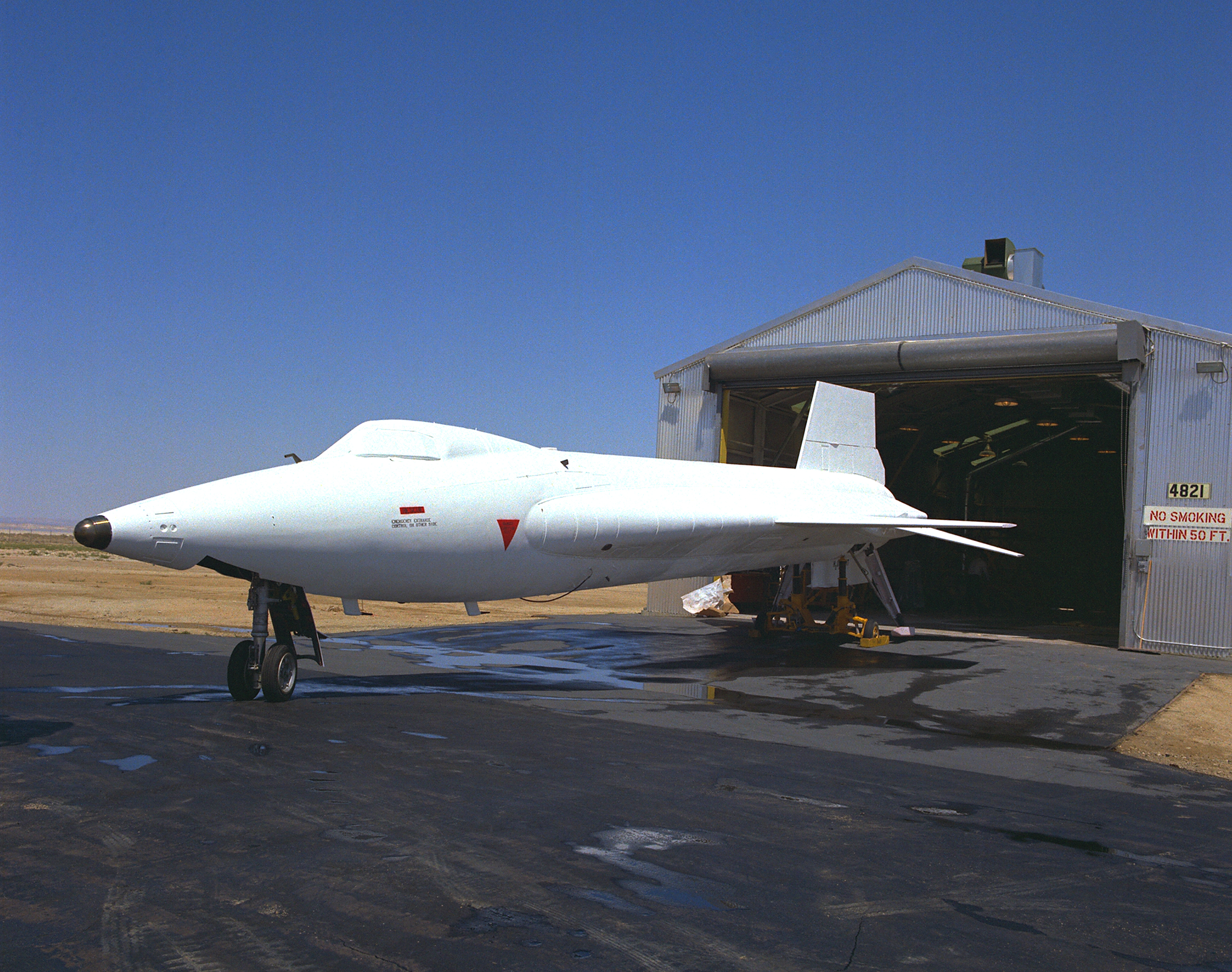
North American X-15A-2 just after white sealer painting on June 26, 1967

X-15 Flight 188 was a record-setting test flight of the North American X-15 rocket plane on October 3, 1967. USAF test pilot William J. Knight piloted the X-15A-2 hypersonic aircraft to 102,100 feet (31,100 meters) over Mud Lake, Nevada, reaching a top speed of 4,520 mph (7,270 km/h), or Mach 6.7. This remains the highest speed ever recorded by a crewed, powered aircraft.

== Background ==
The aircraft used for Flight 188 was the X-15A-2 (AF Ser No. 56-6671). This X-15 was heavily modified compared to the original X-15 specification. Originally designated X-15-2, it was damaged during landing on November 9, 1962 (Flight 74); after extensive repairs and updates, it was redesignated X-15A-2. The fuselage was lengthened by 28 inches (0.71 meters) to accommodate a liquid hydrogen fuel tank for an experimental ramjet engine mounted on the aircraft's ventral fin, which was flown but never used. Two external drop tanks containing anhydrous ammonia and liquid oxygen were fitted to increase the XLR99 main engine's fuel supply by 75%, providing an additional 60 seconds of burn time. To handle the heat of atmospheric entry at hypersonic speed, the entire surface of the airframe was covered with the Martin MA-25S ablative thermal coating; this coating was designed to char and slowly break off as the aircraft experienced aerodynamic heating, carrying away heat in the process. The thermal coating was pink in color, and a white topcoat of sealer was applied over it, giving the aircraft a notably different appearance than the other black painted X-15 airframes.

The X-15A-2 was the only X-15 airframe ever fitted with the drop tanks and ablative thermal coating. Flight 188 was the 53rd flight of X-15 No. 56-6671, and the fifth flight as the modified X-15A-2 configuration.

== Events of the flight ==
Flight 188 took place on October 3, 1967. After minor problems delayed the take-off briefly, the NASA NB-52B mothership Balls 8 took off from the NASA Flight Research Center at Edwards Air Force Base, carrying the X-15A-2 under its right wing up to the planned release altitude of 45,000 ft (14 km). Balls 8 was accompanied by several F-100, F-104, and F5D chase planes, which tailed the X-15A-2 as long as possible after its release and during its landing.

Once the release altitude was reached, the X-15 was released at 14:31:50 local time. X-15 pilot William J. Knight lit the XLR99 rocket engine and pulled up into a climb as the aircraft accelerated rapidly. 60 seconds after release, Knight jettisoned the drop tanks as the X-15 exceeded Mach 2 at an altitude of 70,000 ft (21 km). Now using the internal fuel supply, the engine continued to burn for a total of 140.7 seconds. Knight shut down the engine at an altitude of 102,000 ft (31 km), reaching a maximum speed of 4,520 mph (7,270 km/h), or Mach 6.7.

The experimental ramjet mounted on the ventral fin disrupted airflow during high-speed flight, heating some parts of the fuselage to 2,700 °F (1,480 °C); it eventually broke away from the aircraft and was later recovered on the Edwards Air Force Base bombing range.

As the X-15A-2 decelerated through Mach 5.5, an engine over-temperature warning sounded in the cockpit; Knight attempted to jettison remaining fuel from the internal tanks, but the fuel jettison system had been disabled by heat damage, meaning the aircraft's landing weight (and thus also its landing speed) would be higher than anticipated. Knight jettisoned the detachable lower fin, then safely landed the aircraft on Rogers Dry Lake at 14:40:07 local time after a flight time of 8 minutes and 17 seconds.

== Aftermath ==
The X-15A-2 was found to have sustained extensive thermal damage during the flight. Repairs were not completed before the end of the X-15 program in December 1968, making flight 188 the final flight of X-15 No. 56-6671. The aircraft was ultimately relocated to the National Museum of the United States Air Force in Dayton, Ohio, where it was refurbished and placed on permanent display.

Eleven more X-15 flights were made before the end of the program; Knight would fly three of them, flights 194, 196, and 198. In 1969, Knight was awarded the Harmon Trophy by President Lyndon Johnson for his participation in the X-15 program.

Flight 188 holds the airspeed record for a crewed, powered flight of a non-orbital aircraft.

== Technical information ==
- Total flight time: 8 minutes, 17 seconds
  - Burn time: 140.7 seconds
  - Glide time: 5 minutes, 56 seconds
  - Total distance: 342.79 km (213.00 mi)
  - Maximum speed: 4,520 mph (7,270 km/h); Mach 6.7
- Aircraft: X-15A-2 (AF Ser No. 56-6671)
  - Total mass: 16,069 kg (35,426 lb)
  - Dry mass: 7,766 kg (17,121 lb)
  - Length: 15.97 m (52.4 ft)
  - Height: 15.47 m (50.8 ft)
  - Diameter: 1.42 m (4.7 ft)
  - Wingspan: 6.80 m (22.3 ft)
  - Total fuel: 8,303 kg (18,305 lb)
- Propulsion: Reaction Motors XLR99-RM-2 liquid-propellant rocket engine
  - Fuel: Liquid oxygen and anhydrous ammonia
  - Specific impulse: 276 seconds
  - Burn time: 85 seconds on internal fuel
  - Thrust: 262.445 kN (59,000 lb_{f})
- External drop tanks
  - Total mass: 7,026 kg (15,490 lb)
  - Dry mass: 902 kg (1,989 lb)
  - Volume: 6,814 liters (1,800 U.S. gal)
  - Length: 6.86 m (22.5 ft)
  - Diameter: 0.98 m (3.2 ft)
  - Additional burn time: 60 seconds on external fuel

== Other X-15A-2 flights with external tanks ==
- Flight 155 – November 3, 1965, with empty external tanks, pilot Robert A. Rushworth, Mach 2.31, 5 minutes, 2 seconds
- Flight 159 – July 1, 1966, pilot Rushworth (last flight), Mach 1.70, 4 minutes, 29 seconds
- Flight 175 – November 18, 1966, pilot Knight, Mach 6.33, 8 minutes, 27 seconds, second fastest flight
- Flight 186 – August 21, 1967, with full ablative coating. pilot Knight, Mach 4.94, 7 minutes, 39 seconds

== See also ==
- List of X-15 flights
- Reaction Motors XLR11
