= Frants =

Frants is a given name and a surname. Notable people with the name include:

- Frants Banner (died 1575), Danish landowner and lensmann
- Frants Berg (1504–1591), Danish clergyman, Bishop of Oslo
- Frants Beyer (1851–1918), Norwegian average adjuster, tax inspector and composer
- Frants Diderik Bøe, (1820–1891), Norwegian painter,
- Anna Frants (born 1965), American multimedia artist, curator, and art collector
- Karl-August Frants (1895–1942), Estonian politician
- Frants Frisenfeldt (1889–1976), Danish wrestler
- Frants Gufler (born 1957), Danish curler and curling coach
- Frants Johannes Hansen (1810–1852), Danish author and amateur musician
- Frants Henningsen (1850–1908), Danish painter, illustrator and professor
- Frants Philip Hopstock (1746–1824), Norwegian priest
- Frants Hvass (1896–1982), Danish diplomat
- Frants Kostyukevich (born 1963), race walker, represented the USSR and later Belarus
- Yuriy-Frants Kulchytsky (1640–1694), Polish nobleman, diplomat, and spy during the Great Turkish War
- Frants Levinson-Lessing (1861–1939), Russian geologist
- Frants Nielsen (1874–1961), Danish Olympic sports shooter

== See also ==
- Fran (disambiguation)
- Frant
- Frantz (disambiguation)
