= Alf Boe =

Alf Boe may refer to:

- Alf Bøe (1927–2010), Norwegian art historian
- Alfie Boe (born 1973), English tenor

== See also ==
- Boe (disambiguation)
