= Boe =

Boe, BOE or BoE may refer to:

== Arts, media and entertainment ==
- Bastards of Evil, a comic book supervillain team
- Blades of Exile, a computer role-playing game
- Boletín Oficial del Estado, official gazette of the Spanish government

== Organisations ==
- Bank of England, the central bank of the United Kingdom
- Board of education
- Board of elections
- Board of Equalization (disambiguation)
- BOE Technology, a Chinese electronic components manufacturer
- Boeing (ICAO airline code: BOE), an American company
- Bureau of Energy, an administrative agency of Taiwan
- Bureau of Ocean Energy Management, Regulation and Enforcement, an agency of the US Department of the Interior

== Science and technology ==
- Blue Ocean Event, a hypothetical future ice-free season in the Arctic
- Barrel of oil equivalent, a unit of energy
- Buffered oxide etch, a mixture of ammonia and hydrofluoric acid used in microfabrication

== Places ==
- Boé, a town in south-western France
- Boe Constituency, Nauru
- Boe District, Nauru
- Boe, Guinea-Bissau, a settlement
- Boundji Airport (IATA code: BOE), Congo

== Other uses ==
- Boe (surname)
- Boô or boe, a Saxon cattle shed
- Bank of English, a representative subset of the 4.5 billion words COBUILD corpus
- Basis of estimate, in project management
- Bill of exchange, in business law
- Back-of-the-envelope calculation, a rough estimation

== See also ==
- Bøe, a Norwegian surname
- The Face of Boe, a recurring character in the TV series Doctor Who
