= Boes (surname) =

Boes is a surname. Notable people with the surname include:

- Helge Boes (1970–2003), American intelligence officer
- Jules Boes (1927–2016), Belgian basketball player
- Mirja Boes (born 1971), German comedian, actress, and singer

== See also ==
- Boe (surname)
- Boss (surname)
