= Boe (surname) =

Boe is a surname. Notable people with the surname include:

- Alfie Boe (born 1973), English tenor
- Alisha Boe (born 1997), Norwegian actress
- Archie R. Boe (1921–1989), former president of Sears, Roebuck and Co. and Allstate Insurance Co.
- Christoffer Boe (born 1974), Danish film director and screenwriter
- David Boe (1936–2020), American organist and pedagogue
- Eric Boe (born 1964), United States Air Force fighter pilot Colonel, test pilot and a NASA astronaut
- Jason Boe (1929–1990), American optometrist from Oregon
- John Boe (born 1955), New Zealand former rugby union footballer and a current coach
- Mathias Boe (born 1980), Danish badminton player
- Morten Boe (born 1971), Norwegian athlete who competes in compound archery
- Nils Boe (1913–1992), American politician who served as the 23rd Governor of South Dakota from 1965 to 1969
- Randall Boe (born 1962), was General Counsel for AOL
- Roy Boe (1929–2009), owner of the New Jersey Nets, New York Islanders, and several other professional sports teams
- Tracy Boe, North Dakota Democratic-NPL Party member of the North Dakota House of Representatives

== See also ==
- Bøe
