= Johannes Bøe (archaeologist) =

Norwegian archaeologist

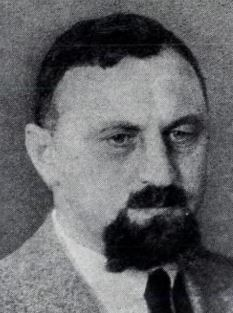
- Born: January 17, 1891; Ringsaker, Norway
- Died: February 1, 1971 (aged 80); Lillehammer, Norway
- Occupation: Archaeologist
- Children: Alf Bøe

Johannes Bøe (January 17, 1891 – February 1, 1971) was a Norwegian archaeologist.

== Biography ==
Johannes Bøe was born in Ringsaker Municipality in Hedmark county, Norway. He was the son of John O. Bøe (1851–1910) and Marie Nilsdatter Bjerke (1859–1953). His father was a farmer at the Ottersrud farm.

He studied at the University of Kristiania (now University of Oslo). In 1921, Bøe received his candidatus philologiæ degree with the thesis Norske guldfund fra folkevandringstiden (Norwegian Gold Finds from the Migration Period). In 1931 he received his doctorate with the dissertation Jernalderens keramikk i Norge (Iron Age Ceramics in Norway). In 1921 he was appointed a researcher at the University Museum of Bergen, and he was later a research professor at the same institution. In 1946, he became a faculty dean at the University of Bergen.

Bøe was distinguished by his exceptionally rich scholarly production, ranging from the early Stone Age to the Iron Age. His best-known work, alongside his doctoral dissertation, is Le Finmarkien: Les origines de la civilisation dans l'extreme-nord de l'Europe (Finnmark: The Origins of Civilization in the Far North of Europe), which he coauthored with Anders Nummedal and in which they established the Komsa culture as having its own status in the Norwegian Stone Age.

== Personal life ==
Bøe married Dagny Godager (1896–1982) in 1920 and was the father of the art historian Alf Bøe (1927–2010).

== Awards and recognitions ==
- Fridtjof Nansen Prize for Outstanding Research, 1932, for his work on Iron Age pottery in Norway
- Bøe was appointed a knight of the Order of St. Olav in 1947, and a commander in 1961.
