= STS-126 =

2008 American crewed spaceflight to the ISS

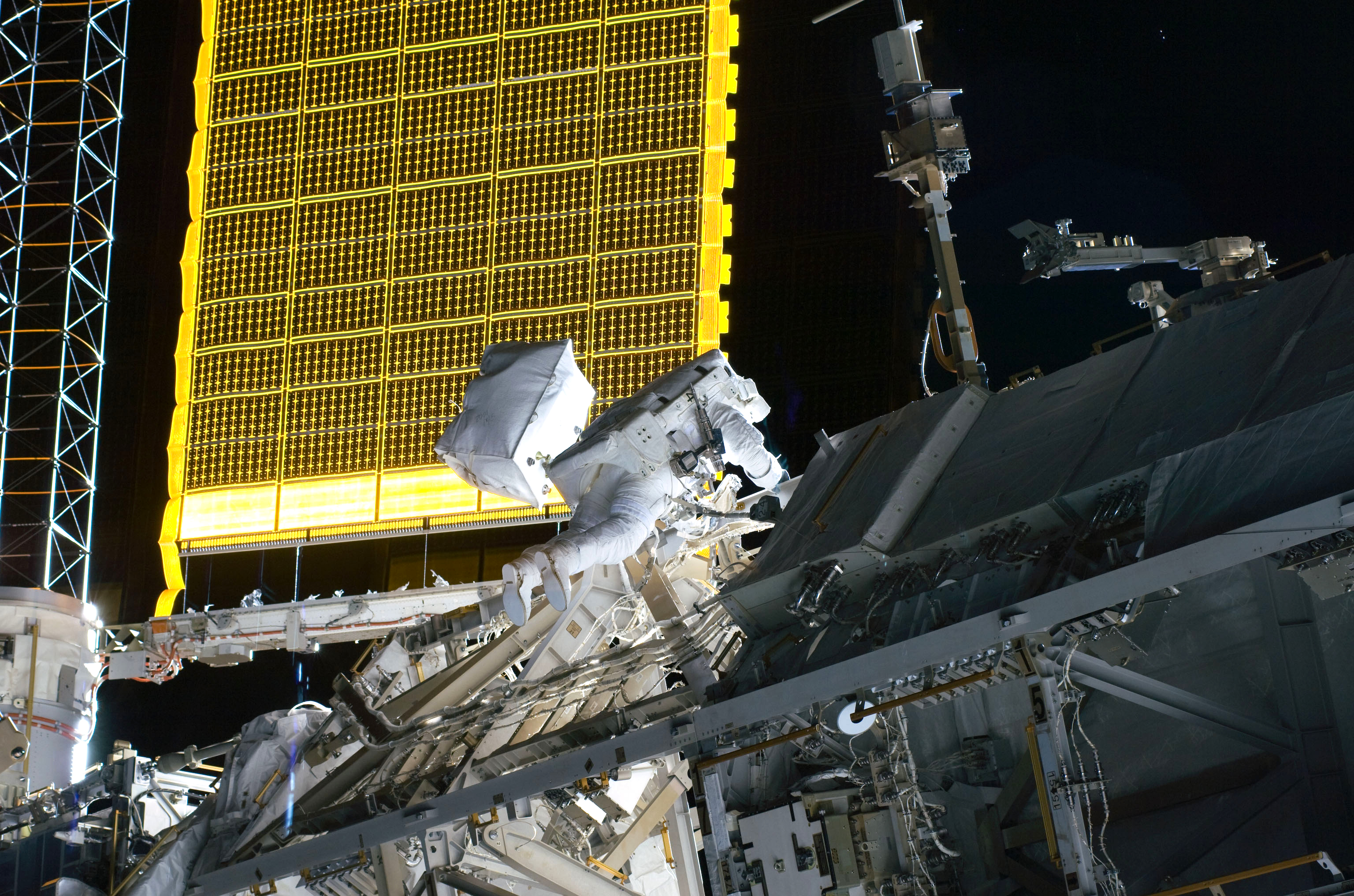
- Bowen atop the S1 truss, en route to repair a faulty Solar Alpha Rotary Joints (SARJ) joints during the mission's first Extravehicular activity (EVA).
- Names: Space Transportation System-126
- Mission type: ISS assembly
- Operator: NASA
- COSPAR ID: 2008-059A
- SATCAT no.: 33441
- Mission duration: 15 days, 20 hours, 30 minutes, 30 seconds (achieved)
- Distance travelled: 10,645,986 km (6,615,109 mi)
- Orbits completed: 251

Spacecraft properties
- Spacecraft: Space Shuttle Endeavour
- Launch mass: 121,061 kg (266,894 lb)
- Landing mass: 101,343 kg (223,423 lb)
- Payload mass: 14,698 kg (32,404 lb)

Crew
- Crew size: 7
- Members: Christopher J. Ferguson; Eric A. Boe; Donald R. Pettit; Stephen G. Bowen; Heidemarie M. Stefanyshyn-Piper; Robert S. Kimbrough
- Launching: Sandra H. Magnus
- Landing: Gregory E. Chamitoff

Start of mission
- Launch date: 15 November 2008, 00:55:39 UTC
- Launch site: Kennedy, LC-39A

End of mission
- Landing date: 30 November 2008, 21:25:09 UTC
- Landing site: Edwards, Runway 4L

Orbital parameters
- Reference system: Geocentric orbit
- Regime: Low Earth orbit
- Perigee altitude: 343 km (213 mi)
- Apogee altitude: 352 km (219 mi)
- Inclination: 51.60°
- Period: 91.60 minutes

Docking with International Space Station
- Docking port: PMA-2 (Harmony forward)
- Docking date: 16 November 2008, 22:01 UTC
- Undocking date: 28 November 2008, 14:47 UTC
- Time docked: 11 days, 16 hours, 46 minutes
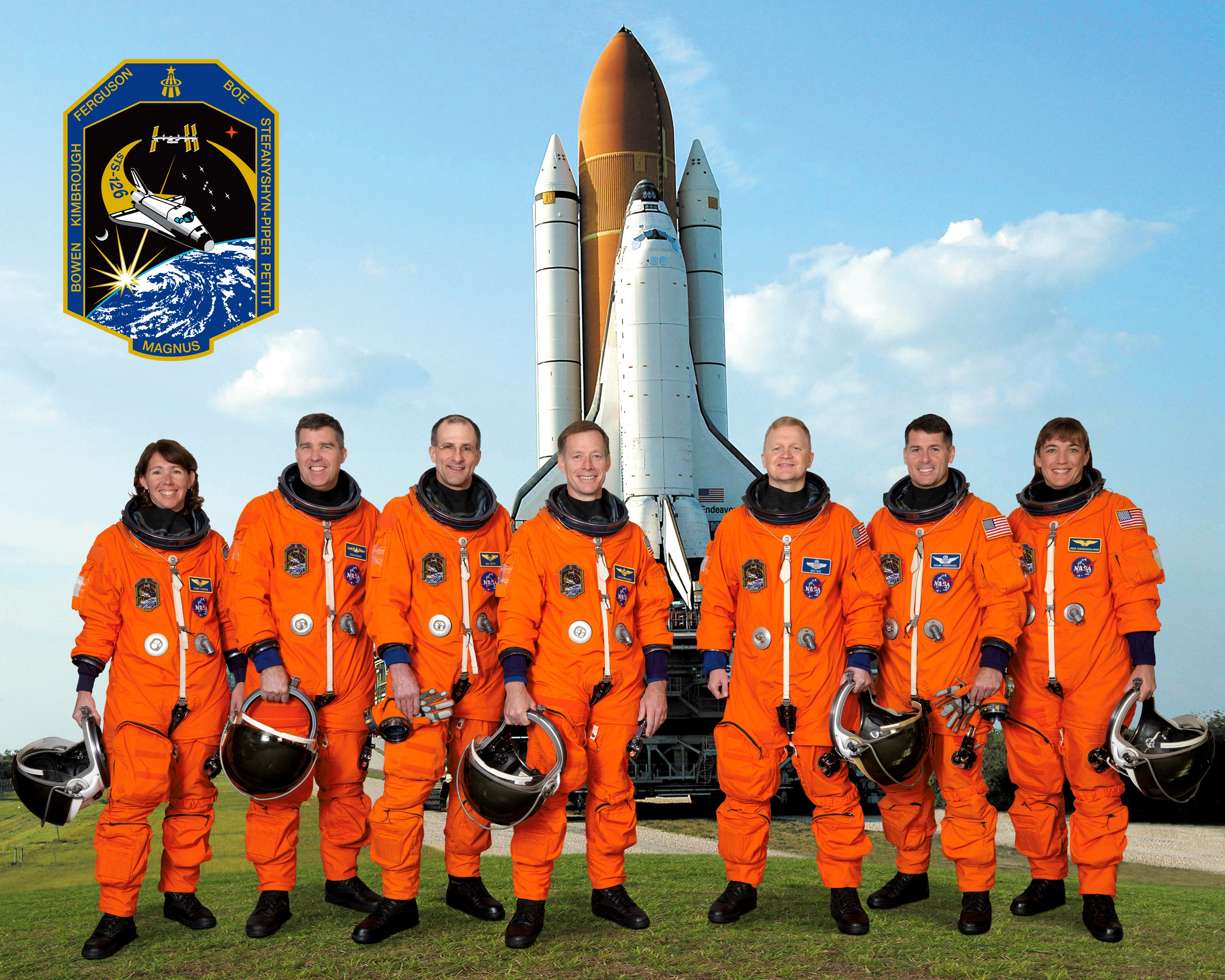
- STS-126 mission patch Sandra H. Magnus, Stephen G. Bowen, Donald R. Pettit, Christopher J. Ferguson, Eric A. Boe, Robert S. Kimbrough, Heidemarie M. Stefanyshyn-Piper Space Shuttle program

STS-126 was the one hundred and twenty-fourth NASA Space Shuttle mission, and twenty-second orbital flight of the Space Shuttle Endeavour (OV-105) to the International Space Station (ISS). The purpose of the mission, referred to as ULF2 by the ISS program, was to deliver equipment and supplies to the station, to service the Solar Alpha Rotary Joints (SARJ), and repair the problem in the starboard SARJ that had limited its use since STS-120. STS-126 launched on 15 November 2008 at 00:55:39 UTC from Launch Pad 39A (LC-39A) at NASA's Kennedy Space Center (KSC) with no delays or issues. Endeavour successfully docked with the station on 16 November 2008. After spending 15 days, 20 hours, 30 minutes, and 30 seconds docked to the station, during which the crew performed four spacewalks, and transferred cargo, the orbiter undocked on 28 November 2008. Due to poor weather at Kennedy Space Center, Endeavour landed at Edwards Air Force Base on 30 November 2008 at 21:25:09 UTC.

== Crew ==
Position	Launching Astronaut	Landing Astronaut
Commander	Christopher J. Ferguson; Second spaceflight	
Pilot	Eric A. Boe; First spaceflight	
Mission Specialist 1	Donald R. Pettit; Second spaceflight	
Mission Specialist 2 Flight Engineer	Stephen G. Bowen; First spaceflight	
Mission Specialist 3	Heidemarie M. Stefanyshyn-Piper; Second and last spaceflight	
Mission Specialist 4	Robert S. Kimbrough; First spaceflight	
Mission Specialist 5	Sandra H. Magnus; Second spaceflight ISS Flight Engineer	Gregory E. Chamitoff; First spaceflight ISS Flight Engineer

=== Crew notes ===
Joan E. Higginbotham was originally scheduled to fly on STS-126, she was previously mission specialist 4 on STS-116. On 21 November 2007, NASA announced a change in the crew manifest due to Higginbotham's decision to leave NASA to take a job in the private sector. Stephen G. Bowen was originally assigned to STS-124 but was moved to STS-126 to allow Discovery to rotate Greg Chamitoff with Garrett E. Reisman.

== Mission payloads ==
STS-126 was scheduled to be a sixteen-day mission with four spacewalks (EVA), largely dedicated to servicing and repair of the Solar Alpha Rotary Joints (SARJ). An additional docked day was added to the flight plan to give the crew more time to complete their tasks. The starboard SARJ had shown anomalous behavior since August 2007, and its use has been minimized pending diagnosis and repair. Both the port and starboard SARJs were serviced. In addition to lubricating both bearings, the remaining 11 trundle bearings in the starboard SARJ were replaced. Trundle bearing assembly No. 5, one of the 12 assemblies, was removed during an Expedition 16 EVA for further examination in December 2007.

STS-126 included the Leonardo Multi-Purpose Logistics Module (MPLM) on its fifth spaceflight. Leonardo held over 6,400 kg (14,100 lb) of supplies and equipment. Among the items packed into the MPLM were two new crew quarters racks, a second galley (kitchen) for the Destiny laboratory, a second Waste and Hygiene Compartment (WHC) rack (lavatory), the advanced Resistive Exercise Device (aRED), two water reclamation racks, spare hardware, and new experiments. Also included in Leonardo was the General Laboratory Active Cryogenic ISS Experiment Refrigerator, or GLACIER, a double locker cryogenic freezer for transporting and preserving science experiments. The shuttle also carried irradiated turkey, candied yams, stuffing and dessert for a special Thanksgiving meal at the station, as well as an Official Flight Kit with mementos for those who supported the astronauts and helped them complete their mission successfully. Also carried was a Lightweight MPESS Carrier (LMC) carrying a Flex Hose Rotary Coupler (FHRC) and returning a Nitrogen Assembly Tank from Quest for refurbishment.

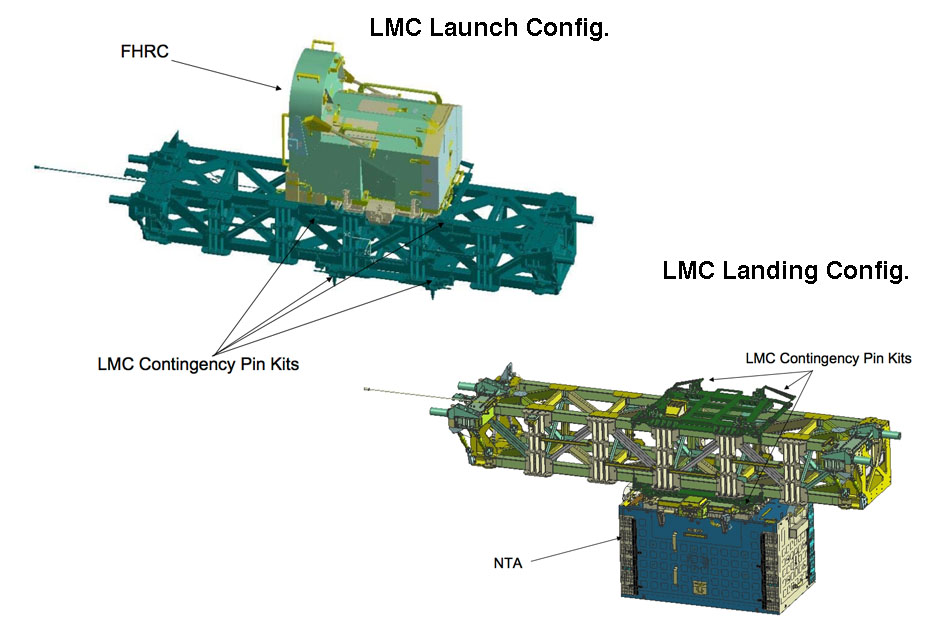
LMC with FHRC and NTA STS-126

Location	Cargo	Mass
Bays 1–2	Orbiter Docking System; EMU 3005 / EMU 3011	1,800 kg (4,000 lb); ~260 kg (570 lb)
Bay 3P	Shuttle Power; Distribution Unit (SPDU)	~17 kg (37 lb)
Bay 3S	APC/SSPL Picosat launcher PSSC Picosats	50 kg (110 lb); 7 kg (15 lb)
Bay 7S	ROEU umbilical	~79 kg (174 lb)
Bay 7–12	Leonardo (MPLM FM-1)	12,748 kg (28,105 lb)
Bays 13	Lightweight MPESS Carrier (LMC)	1,495 kg (3,296 lb)
Starboard Sill	Orbiter Boom Sensor System	~382 kg (842 lb)
Port Sill	Canadarm 201	410 kg (900 lb)
	Total:	17,370 kg (38,290 lb)

=== Educational outreach ===
STS-126 carried the signatures of over 500,000 students that participated in the 2008 Student Signatures in Space program, jointly sponsored by NASA and Lockheed Martin. In celebration of Space Day last May 2008, students from over 500 schools signed giant posters, their signatures were scanned onto a disk, and the disk was flown on the STS-126 mission. The Student Signatures in Space project has been active since 1997, and has flown student signatures on seven other shuttle flights, starting with STS-86.

=== Agricultural camera (AgCam) ===
Also aboard STS-126 was the Agricultural Camera (AgCam) which was installed in the Destiny module and is used to assist farmers and provide educational opportunities for students around the country. Students and faculty at the University of North Dakota built the Agricultural Camera (AgCam), that was to be delivered and installed on the International Space Station. The students will operate the camera from their campus and work with NASA engineers and station astronauts to take visible and infrared light images of growing crops, grasslands, forests and wetlands in the Great Plains and Rocky Mountains regions.

The information from AgCam provided data to agricultural producers in North Dakota and neighboring states, benefiting farmers and ranchers and providing ways for them to protect the environment. AgCam imagery also may assist in disaster management, such as flood monitoring and wild fire mapping.

=== Cow embryos and pig cells in space ===
STS-126 also flew the first bovine embryos as well as porcine embryonic stem cells on an American spacecraft for an experiment to evaluate effects of the environment of space on embryonic development. The project was a joint project of ZeroGravity Inc., University of Florida and USDA ARS.

=== Crew seat assignments ===
Seat	Launch	Landing	Seats 1–4 are on the flight deck. Seats 5–7 are on the mid-deck.
1	Ferguson		Seats 1–4 are on the flight deck. Seats 5–7 are on the mid-deck.
2	Boe		Seats 1–4 are on the flight deck. Seats 5–7 are on the mid-deck.
3	Pettit	Kimbrough	Seats 1–4 are on the flight deck. Seats 5–7 are on the mid-deck.
4	Bowen		Seats 1–4 are on the flight deck. Seats 5–7 are on the mid-deck.
5	Stefanyshyn-Piper		Seats 1–4 are on the flight deck. Seats 5–7 are on the mid-deck.
6	Kimbrough	Pettit	Seats 1–4 are on the flight deck. Seats 5–7 are on the mid-deck.
7	Magnus	Chamitoff	Seats 1–4 are on the flight deck. Seats 5–7 are on the mid-deck.

== Mission background ==
The mission marks:

- 155th NASA crewed space flight
- 124th Space Shuttle mission since STS-1
- 99th post-Challenger mission
- 11th post-Columbia mission
- 22nd flight of Endeavour
- 27th shuttle mission to the ISS
- 31st night launch

== Shuttle processing ==
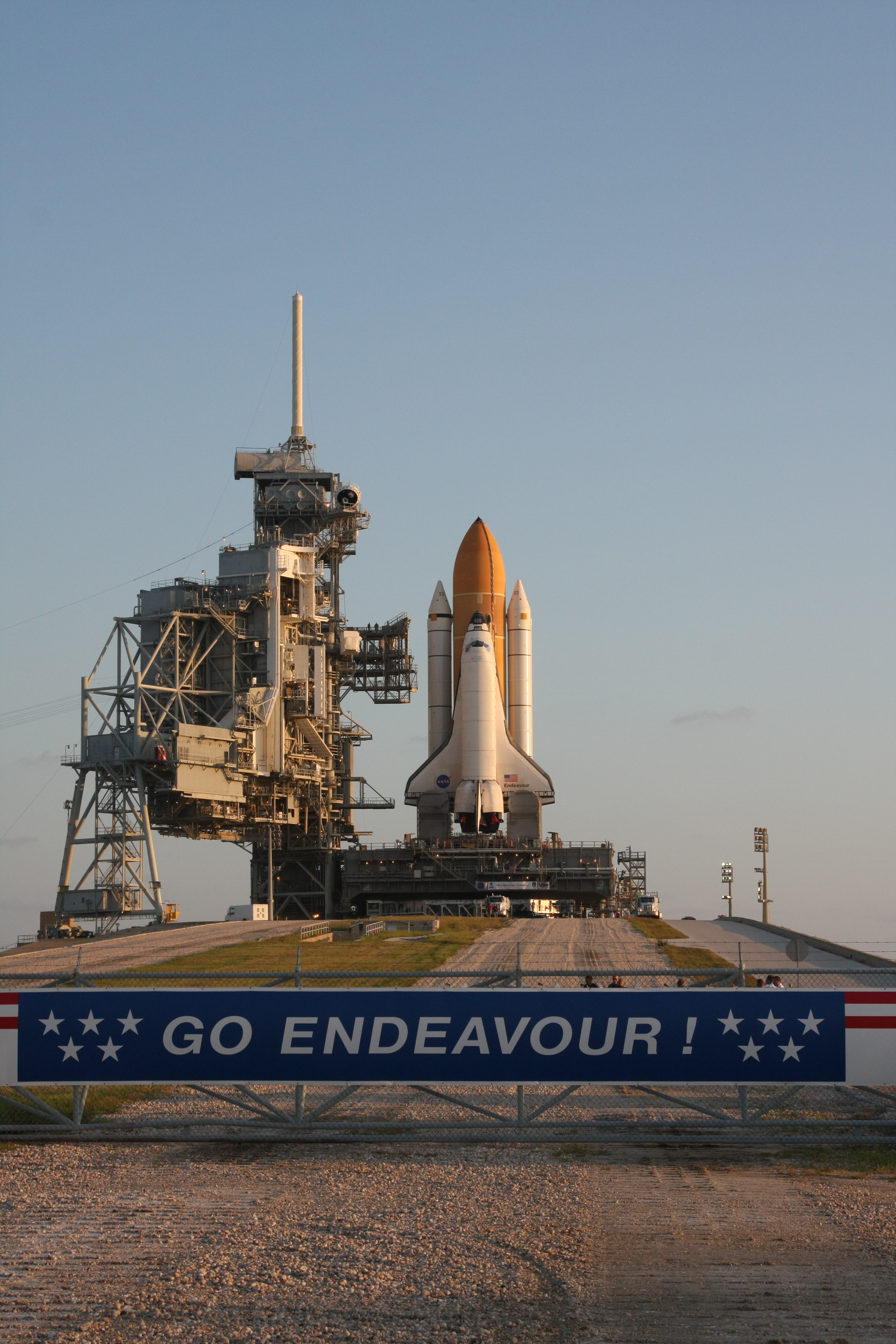
Endeavour at launch pad 39B prior to moving to pad 39A.

Space Shuttle Endeavour was moved from the Orbiter Processing Facility (OPF-2) at Kennedy Space Center to the Vehicle Assembly Building (VAB) on 11 September 2008. Rollout to launch pad 39B took place overnight on 18 September 2008 and was completed at 12:00 UTC on 19 September 2008.

Endeavour was originally moved to launch pad 39B ahead of the normal schedule to be on standby as the Launch on Need (LON) flight for STS-125. In the event that something happened to Atlantis during its flight to service the Hubble Space Telescope, a rescue flight could be performed with Endeavour. With both Atlantis and Endeavour on the pads, it was the 18th time that two flight-ready orbiters were in position at both launch pads at the same time.

On 29 September 2008, NASA announced that due to a problem with the Hubble telescope, they would be revising the manifest to postpone STS-125 until 2009, so a solution to the issue with the telescope could be integrated into the flight plan. This moved STS-126 to the next flight, so on 23 October 2008 Endeavour was moved from launch pad 39B to 39A.

The payload for STS-126, including the MPLM Leonardo, arrived at launch pad 39A early on 22 October 2008.

== Mission timeline ==
=== Launch preparations ===
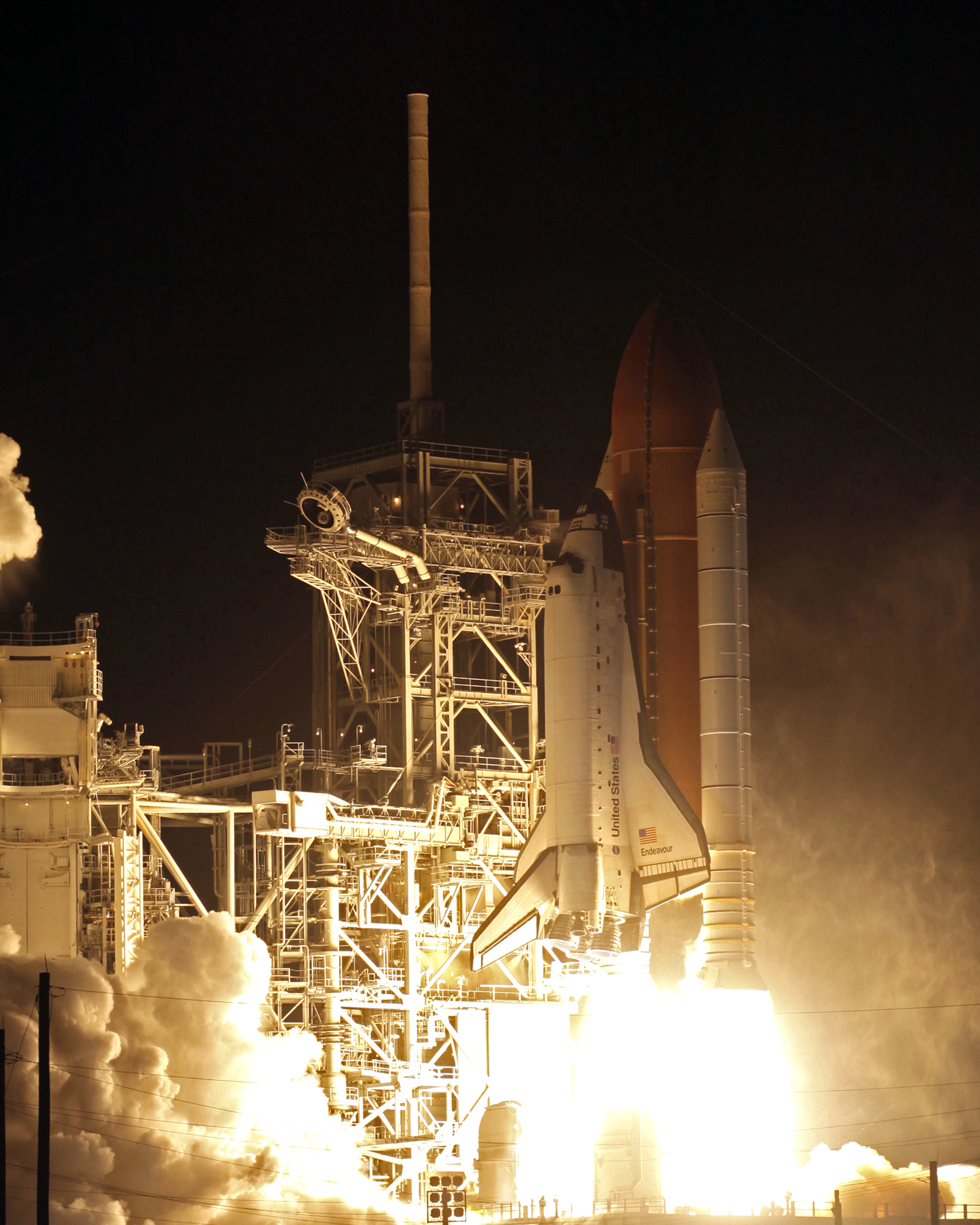
Space Shuttle Endeavour as it lifted off to begin the STS-126 mission to the International Space Station.

The countdown to launch began on 11 November 2008 and the crew flew in from Johnson Space Center (JSC) to the Kennedy Space Center to prepare for the launch. On 12 November 2008, Mission Management Team (MMT) Chairman LeRoy E. Cain announced that the MMT gave the official "go" for Endeavour's launch on 13 November 2008 and Ferguson and Boe practiced landings in the Shuttle Training Aircraft (STA). Weather reports on 13 November 2008 gave a 70% chance of acceptable weather conditions for launch.

=== 14 November (Flight day 1, Launch) ===
Filling of the external tank with liquid hydrogen and liquid oxygen propellants started at 15:30 UTC on 14 November 2008. After suiting up into the launch and entry suits, the crew left the Operations and Checkout Building (O&C) in the Astrovan and arrived at the launch pad at 21:22 UTC. At 21:30 UTC, the crew began ingress into the orbiter, and by 22:25 UTC, all crewmembers were in their seats and performed communications checks with the ground control personnel. At 23:00 UTC, the closeout crew closed and locked Endeavour's hatch, and the orbiter's cabin was pressurized in preparation for launch. Despite a last minute issue with the white room closeout door not being fully secured, NASA Launch Director Michael D. Leinbach polled the team, determined the door did not pose a hazard to the orbiter or crew, and told the crew "Good luck, Godspeed and have a happy Thanksgiving in orbit". Endeavour lifted off on time at 00:55:39 UTC. External tank separation occurred at 01:03 UTC.

After reaching orbit, the crew began working through the post-insertion timeline, which included opening the orbiter's payload bay doors, deploying the Ku-band antenna, powering up and activating the shuttle robotic arm (Canadarm), and performing a burn of the Orbital Maneuvering System (OMS).

=== 15 November (Flight day 2) ===
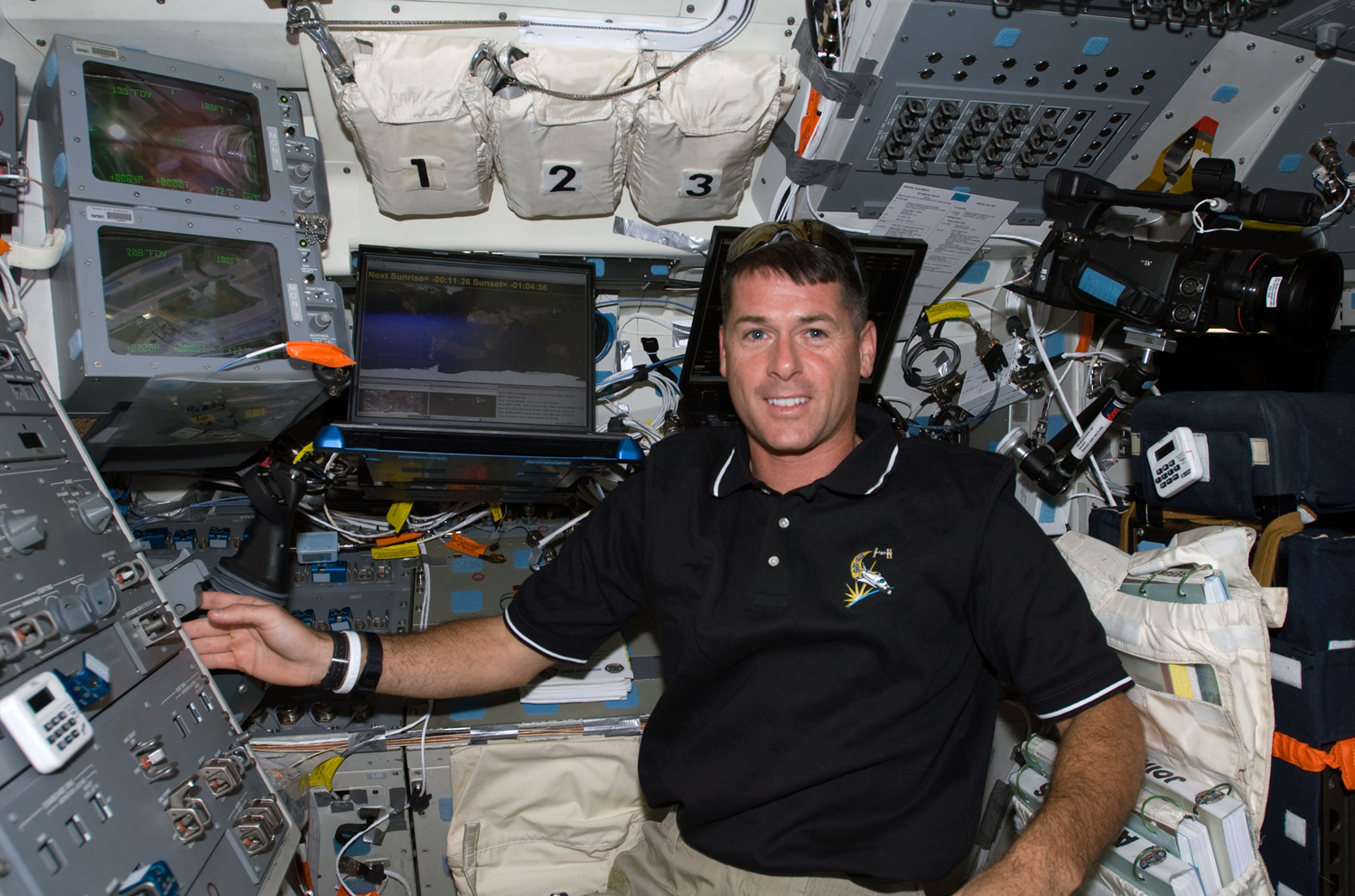
On 15 November 2008, Kimbrough stops for a photo while working on the aft flight deck of Endeavour.

The second day in space for the crew was devoted to completing the initial inspection of Endeavour's heat shield. Using the shuttle's robotic arm (Canadarm) and the Orbiter Boom Sensor System (OBSS), the crew took detailed images of the exterior of the orbiter for the image analysis team to review. The crew also continued to prepare for docking with the station on 16 November 2008, by extending the docking ring, installing the centerline camera, and organizing the tools needed for rendezvous with the station. The crew also performed a checkout of the spacesuits that will be used for the spacewalks during the mission.

During the Mission Management Team briefing, LeRoy E. Cain noted that upon initial review of the ascent imagery, a small piece of thermal blanket appeared to come loose under the left Orbital Maneuvering System (OMS) pod, but explained that the area is not in an area of concern, as it does not experience high heat during reentry. During the Mission Status briefing, lead Flight Director Mike Sarafin said that after having the crew focus the camera on the left OMS pod, it did not appear that there was any damage, but the image analysis team would take a closer look at the area.

Two issues with the orbiter's Ku-band antenna were noted by Cain, although he stated they would not impact the mission. The antenna was not handing over from Ku to S-band automatically as it should, which meant that teams on the ground had to manually switch the antenna from Ku- to S-Band and back again. Sarafin noted that this was likely a software issue, and would not affect the crew on board, or the mission. The other issue had to do with the antenna's failure to "lock on" to satellite targets after being given the pointing data. Instead, the antenna was drifting, which meant that the teams on the ground would have to use an alternate method of pointing the antenna. There was a possibility that the shuttle crew would need to use a backup procedure during rendezvous with the station, but it was not a concern, and would not change the timeline, Cain noted.

=== 16 November (Flight day 3) ===
After waking up, the crew set to work preparing for the rendezvous and docking with the station. The orbiter performed a final burn of the engines at 19:27 UTC to refine the approach, and by 21:00 UTC, the shuttle was in position below the station to allow the station crew to photograph the underside of the orbiter. Ferguson guided the shuttle manually through the Rendezvous pitch maneuver (RPM) while station crew used 400 mm (16 in) and 800 mm (31 in) cameras to take high-resolution images of the thermal tiles on Endeavour. The images were downlinked to NASA's image analysis team to assist in the evaluation of the thermal protection system of the orbiter. After the RPM was complete, Ferguson guided the orbiter into a safe docking at 22:01 UTC, and the hatches were opened at 00:16 UTC. Upon entering the station, Ferguson joked "Hey, we figured we'd go for a 10-year anniversary party for the space station, so that's what we showed up for". Ferguson was referring to the 20 November 1998 launch of Zarya, the first component of the International Space Station.

After the two crews exchanged greetings, they performed a safety briefing, and then set right to work, beginning transfers and preparing for robotic operations. At 02:50 UTC, Chamitoff and Magnus officially switched positions, with the swap of their Soyuz seatliners. Chamitoff joined the STS-126 crew as a mission specialist, and Magnus officially became the flight engineer 2 for Expedition 18.

During the mission status briefing, LeRoy E. Cain stated that the image analysis team was still evaluating the ascent imagery, but that the vehicle looked very clean, and the only event that was seen on launch, the area under the left OMS pod, appeared to have been ice. The images taken during the flight day two survey showed that all of the thermal blankets in that area were intact, as were the tiles. Cain stated that the item did not strike the orbiter, it was the only event that the Mission Management Team was still evaluating, and that the orbiter was in good shape. Sarafin confirmed that the Ku-band antenna performed properly in radar mode, and docking was carried out without any problems with the antenna.

=== 17 November (Flight day 4) ===
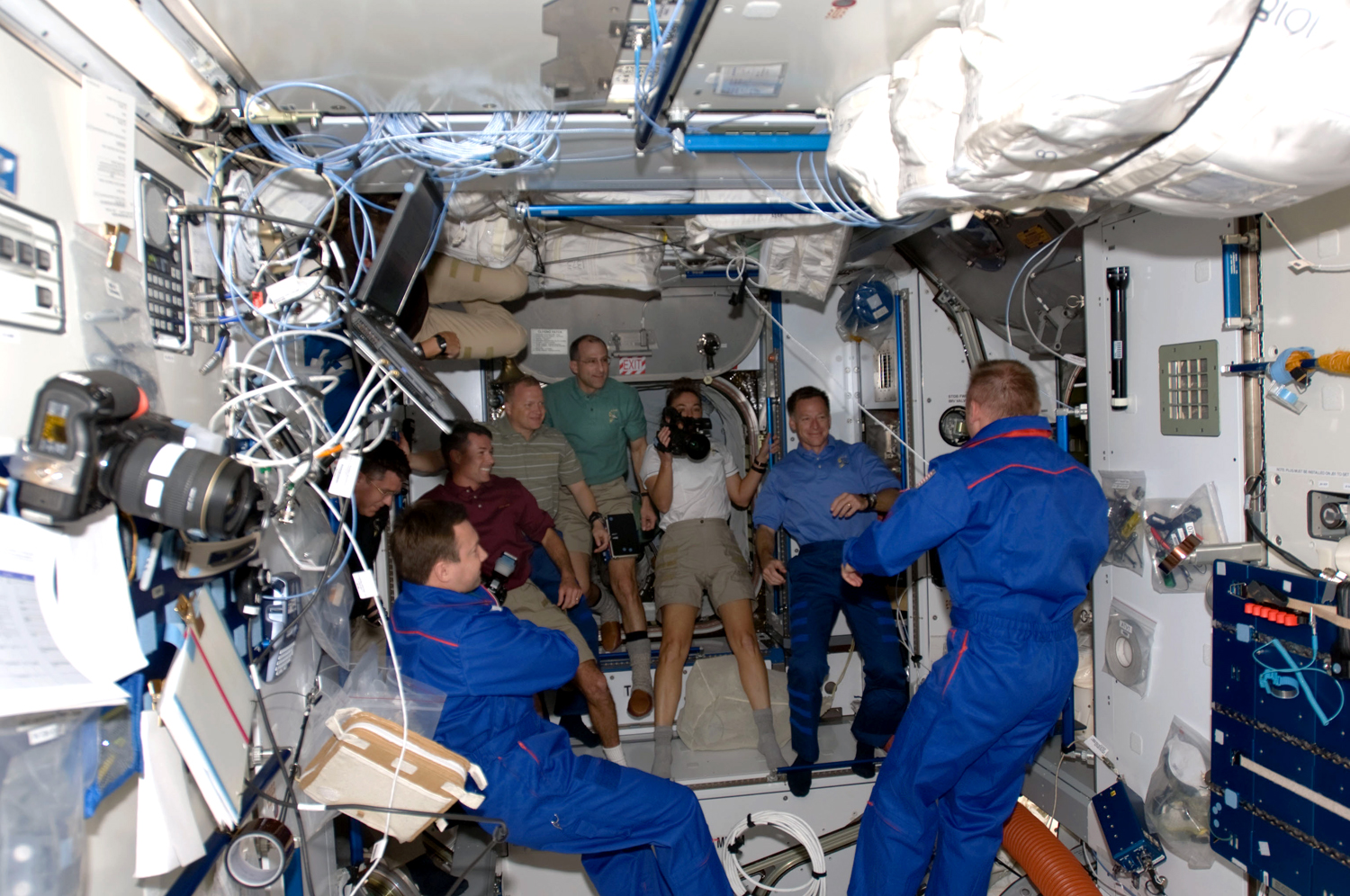
Following the docking of Endeavour, Expedition 18 crewmembers welcome the shuttle crew into the station.

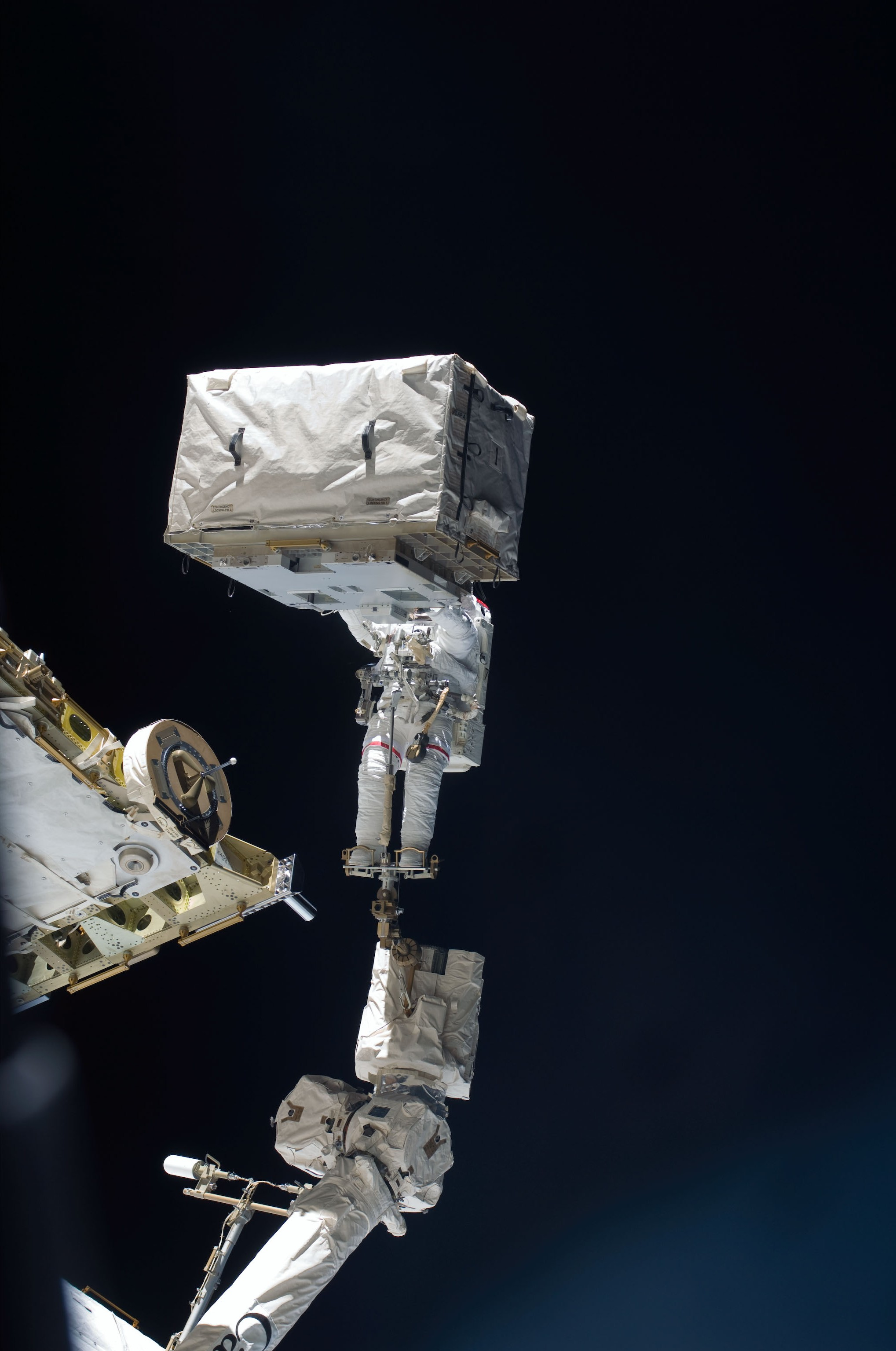
Mission Specialist Stefanyshyn-Piper handles the Nitrogen Tank Assembly during EVA 1.

Following the wake-up call, the two crews began the procedures to move the Leonardo MPLM out of the orbiter's payload bay to install it on the Earth-facing port of the Harmony module. Using the station's Canadarm2, Pettit and Kimbrough began maneuvering the 12,247 kg (27,000 lb) container around 16:45 UTC, and by at 18:04 UTC it was locked in place. After performing leak checks, the hatch was opened at 23:43 UTC. The crews took air samples and examined the container for any signs of condensation or shifting of the contents during launch. The container had no issues, and transfer of cargo between the container and the station began shortly after the hatch was opened. The team also worked on experiments that were flown with Endeavour, including one that involves observing spiders and butterflies in space. The experiment from Florida, Texas and Colorado schoolchildren is being conducted to compare spider webs created in microgravity with those on Earth. The insects will be returned to Earth with the shuttle for additional study.

Later in the day, the crew members reviewed spacewalk procedures to prepare for the first of the four planned EVAs. Piper and Bowen began the protocol known as the "campout" prior to their sleep period. Camping out consists of spending the night in the Quest joint airlock at lower air pressure (70.33 kPa (10.2 psi)) to lessen the time needed to acclimate to the environment in the spacesuits.

During the Mission Management Team briefing, Cain confirmed that the orbiter's wing leading edge had been cleared, and that no focused inspection would be required. The time that was scheduled for that inspection on day six would instead be spent working on the station's new water reclamation unit. While the image analysis team was still reviewing the imagery from the day two inspection and RPM, Cain said the orbiter was "doing extremely well", and expected the image analysis team to clear it for re-entry within a day. Cain noted that the imagery from the external tank showed it to be extremely clean, with only three small areas of foam loss noted.

During the Mission Status briefing, ISS Deputy Program Manager Kirk Shireman noted the upcoming ten-year anniversary of the International Space Station. Shireman reviewed the progress and advancements that have come from the project, and reviewed some of the major milestones. Thirty Progress vehicles have visited the station, seventeen Soyuz vehicles, twenty-seven space shuttles, and one Automated Transfer Vehicle (ATV). One hundred sixty-four people had visited the station from fourteen nations prior to STS-126, (167 once STS-126 docked) and on 20 November 2008, the tenth anniversary, Shireman said the station will have orbited the Earth 57,509 times, for a total distance of over 2,100,000,000 km (1.3×10^{9} mi).

=== 18 November (Flight day 5) ===
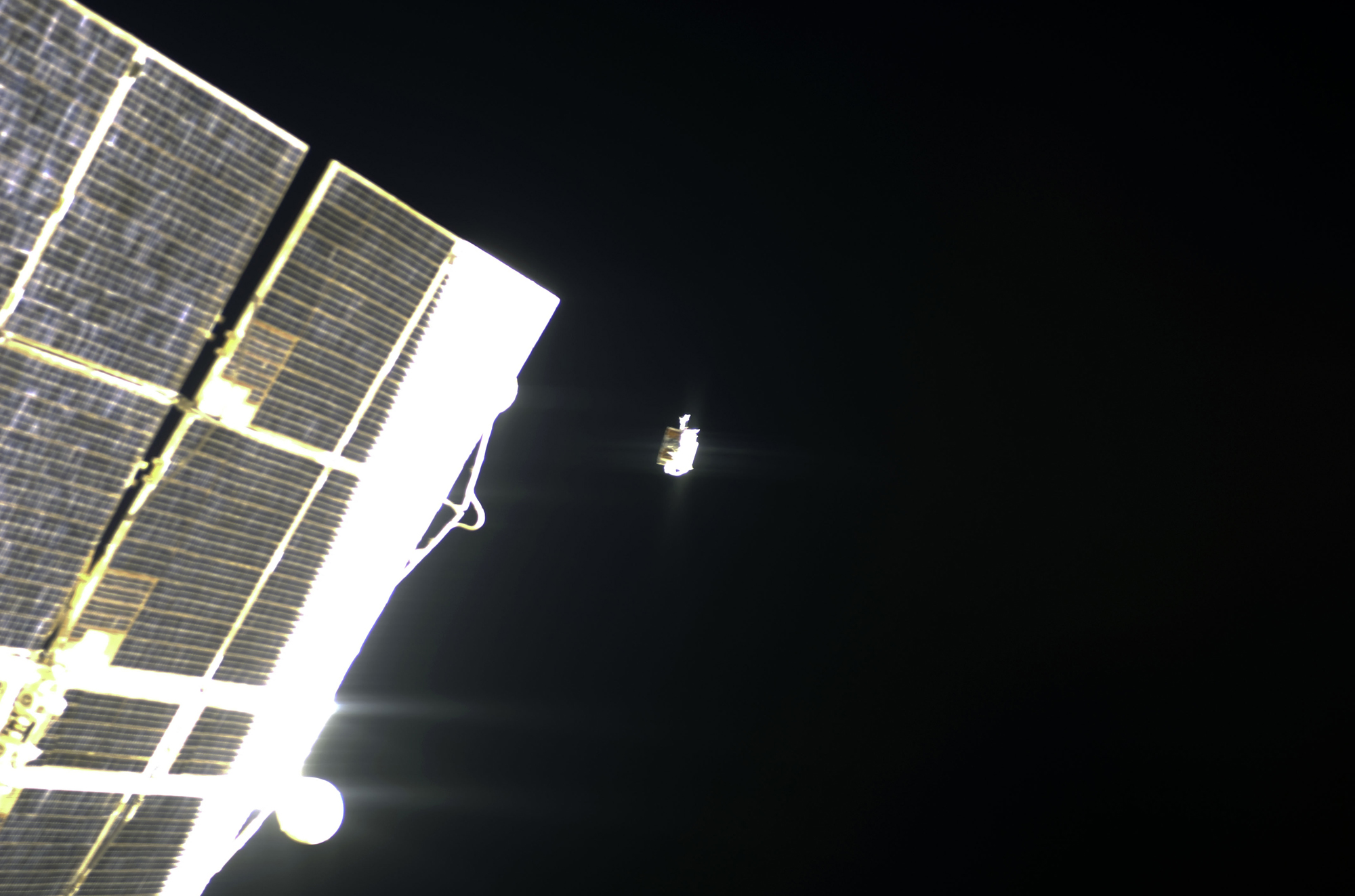
The crew lock bag holding tools floats away from the space station during EVA 1.

Following their post-sleep period, the crews set to work preparing for the first spacewalk of the mission. Stefanyshyn-Piper and Bowen were suited up and in the airlock ahead of schedule, and the EVA started at 18:09 UTC, with Piper becoming the first female Lead Spacewalker. While Piper was preparing to begin work on the SARJ, she noticed a significant amount of grease in her tool bag, "I think we had a grease gun explode in the large bag, because there's grease in the bag", Piper reported to Kimbrough, who was working inside the shuttle to help coordinate the EVA. Mission Control managers instructed Piper to clean up the grease using a dry wipe, and while she was doing the cleanup, one of the crew lock bags floated away. "I guess one of my crew lock bags was not transferred and it's loose", Piper told Kimbrough. The bag floated aft and starboard of the station, and did not pose a risk to the station or orbiter. After taking an inventory of the items inside the lost bag, managers on the ground determined that Bowen had all those items in his bag, and the two could share equipment. While it extended the EVA duration slightly, the major objectives were not changed, and all EVA tasks were accomplished. The estimated value of the lost tool bag was US$100,000. An amateur astronomer later observed the tool bag as it orbited the Earth prior to re-entering. It was not the first time that equipment had gotten away from spacewalkers, items lost in the past include tools, nuts and bolts, glue guns, cameras, cloths, and even a robotic arm. The United States Space Surveillance Network constantly monitors over 12,500 items in orbit around the Earth.

During the Mission Status briefing, lead ISS Flight Director Ginger Kerrick noted that there was no way to know what caused the bag to come loose. "We don't know that this incident occurred because they forgot to tether something. We don't know if perhaps the hook just came loose inside the bag", Kerrick said. "You've got to remember, we are working with humans here and we are prone to human error. We do the best we can, and we learn from our mistakes". Kerrick noted that the team would be taking extra precautions to avoid any further problems with the grease guns, by attaching them to the outside of the bags instead of inside to prevent the plungers from being inadvertently activated.

=== 19 November (Flight day 6) ===
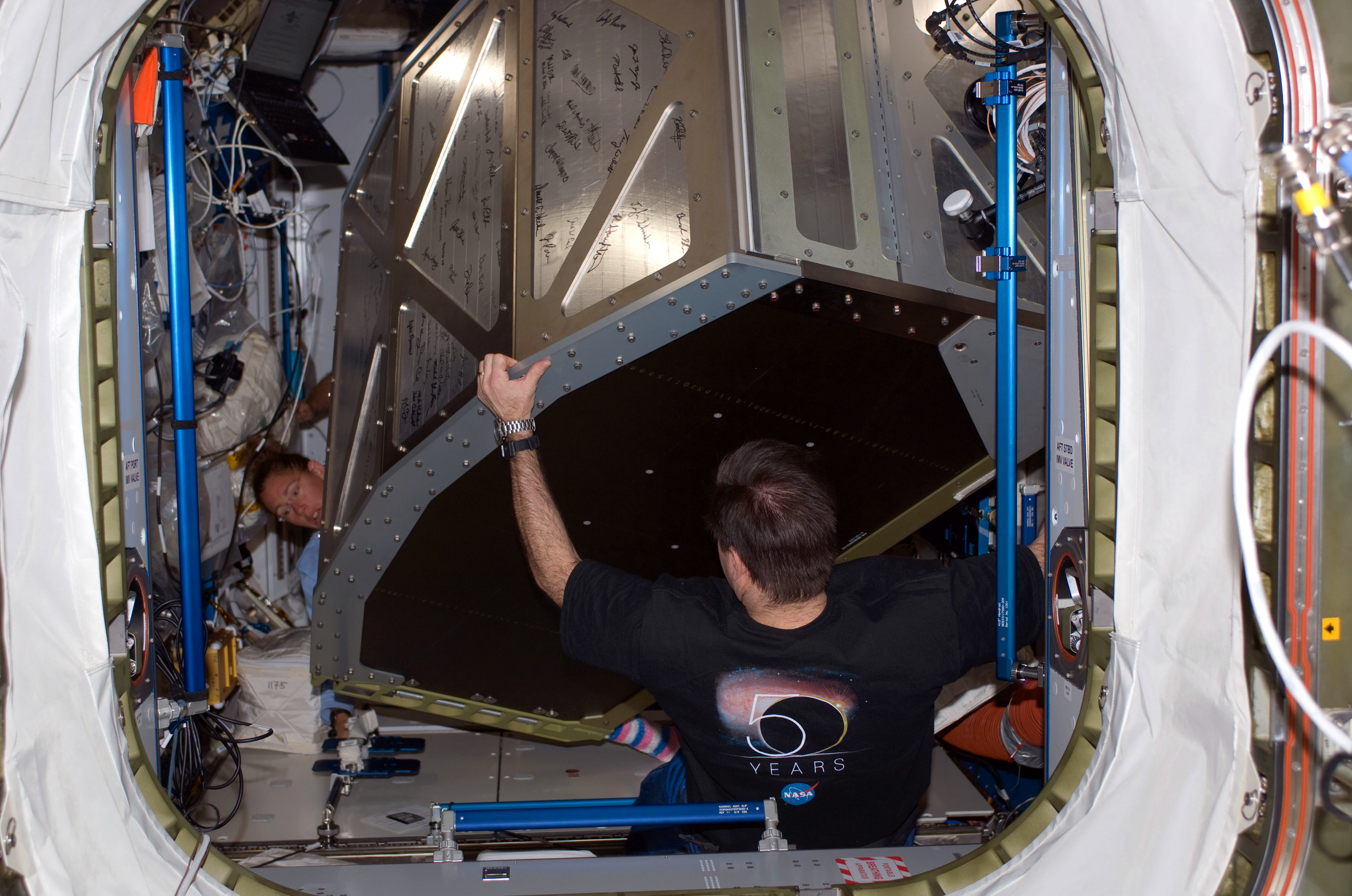
Chamitoff and Magnus transfer one of the two new crew quarters racks. Visible on the back of the rack are the signatures of the members of the ground team that worked on the new equipment.

Flight day six was devoted to transfer operations, and the two crews worked through the morning to complete all the rack transfers. Magnus and Chamitoff successfully installed the two crew quarters racks into the Harmony node, and installed a rack with equipment to be returned to Earth into the MPLM. During the Mission Status briefing, Lead ISS Flight Director Ginger Kerrick noted that all the racks were now on station, and about 25% of the cargo transfers had been completed, which was slightly ahead of schedule. The two crews also began working on activating the Water Recovery System, so that samples of water from two areas could be taken and returned to Earth with Endeavour. The system's initial checkout was initiated, and water samples would be taken after several days of operation. Later in the day, the two crews reviewed procedures for the mission's second EVA, and Stefanyshyn-Piper and Kimbrough would sleep in the station's airlock as part of the pre-EVA campout procedure.

=== 20 November (Flight day 7) ===
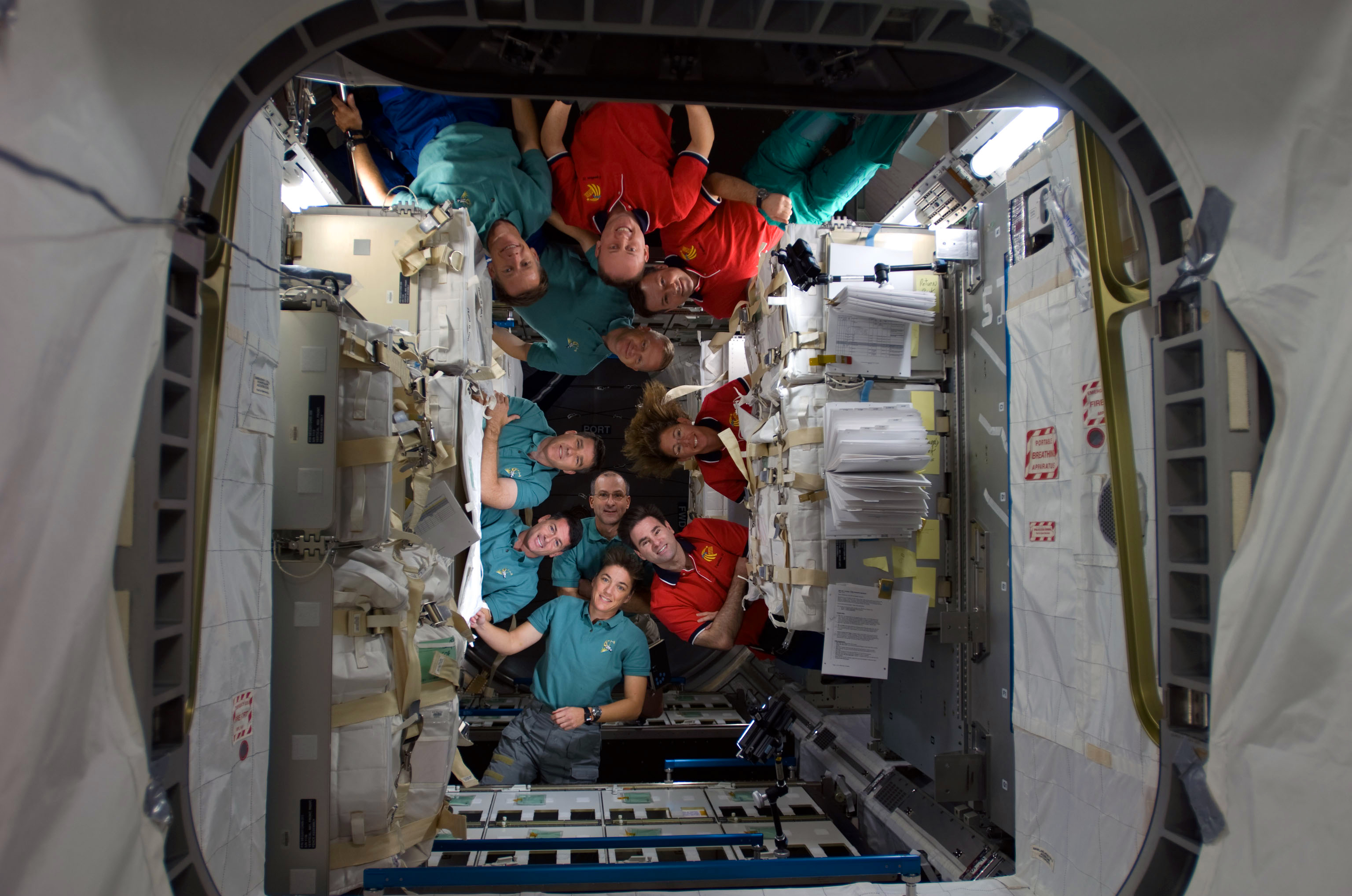
Following the traditional joint crew news conference, shuttle and station crews posed for a group photo.

On the tenth anniversary of the International Space Station, Stefanyshyn-Piper and Kimbrough successfully conducted the mission's second spacewalk. The EVA was 6 hours and 45 minutes in duration, and all tasks were accomplished without complications. Two crew equipment carts were relocated in preparation for the arrival of the final set of solar arrays, the station's robotic arm was lubricated, and the work on the starboard SARJ continued. Inside the station, crewmembers continued to transfer cargo from Leonardo to the station, items to be returned to Earth into the MPLM, and continued the activation of the Water Recovery System.

=== 21 November (Flight day 8) ===
Following the crew wake up call, the two crews set to work on the day's planned activities. Fincke and Magnus tested latches on the Exposed Facility Berthing Mechanism for the Japanese Kibo laboratory. Magnus continued with the installation of the Total Organic Carbon Analyzer (TOCA), while engineers on the ground worked through troubleshooting of the Urine Processor Assembly (UPA). The component initially ran on the evening of 20 November 2008, but shut itself down during that initial test, and shut down again the following morning after two hours of operations. Engineers were considering if the issue was a problem with the sensors, or with the centrifuge motor. At 17:10 UTC, Ferguson and Boe used the shuttle's engines to reboost the station's altitude, raising it by about 1.9 km (1.2 mi) to prepare for the next Progress arrival.

The two crews also participated in the traditional Joint Crew News Conference, answering questions from reporters around the world, and took the traditional crew photo. Cargo transfers continued between the vehicles, and the crew was about 75% complete with all transfers to and from the MPLM. After a bit of off-duty time, the two crews participated in an EVA review, in preparation for the mission's third spacewalk. Piper and Bowen spent the night in the Quest airlock for the campout prior to the next day's spacewalk.

=== 22 November (Flight day 9) ===
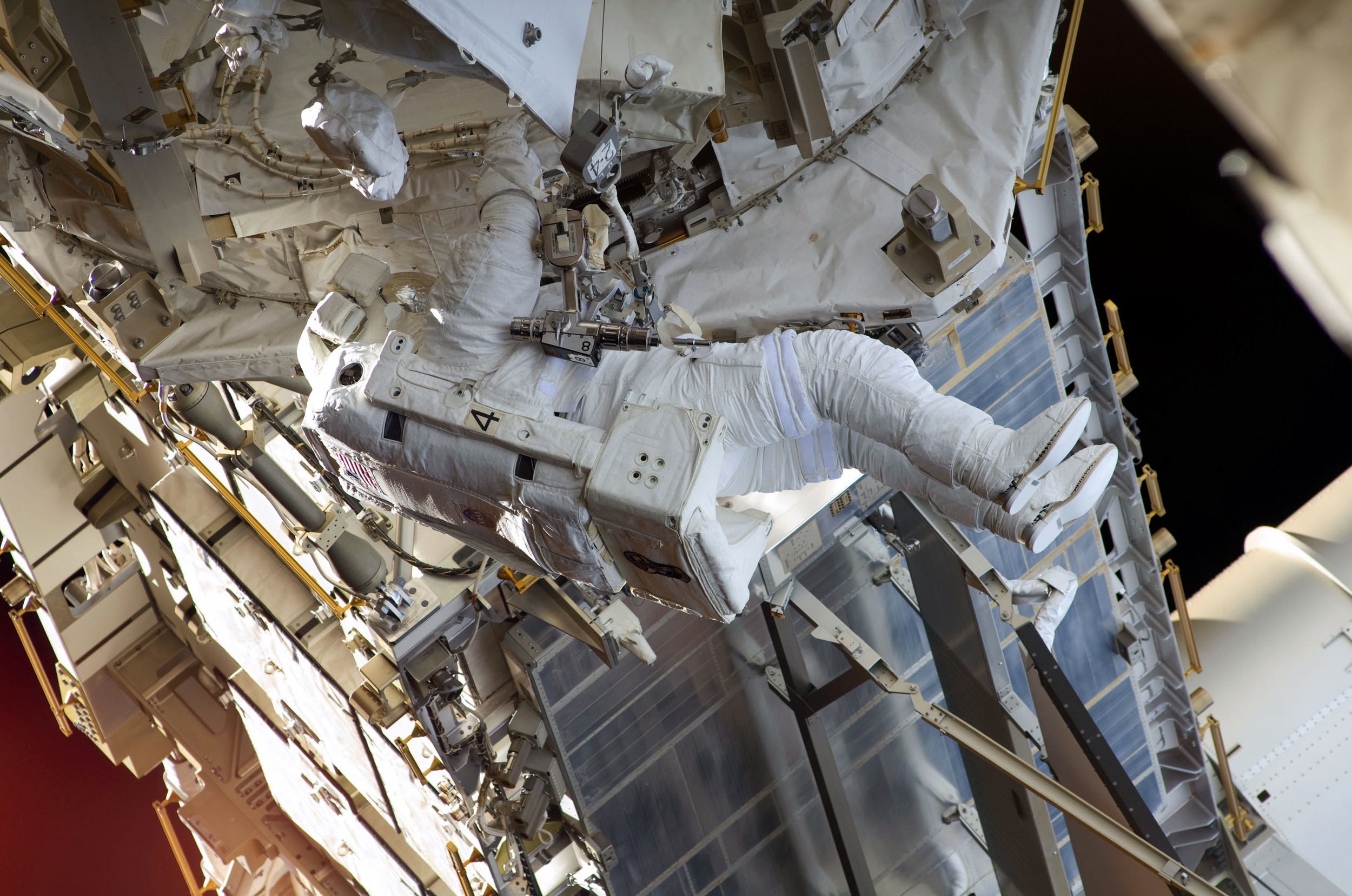
Bowen works on the SARJ during the mission's third spacewalk.

After awakening, the two crews prepared for the mission's third EVA, which began at 18:01 UTC. The entire spacewalk was devoted to completing the cleaning, lubrication, removal and replacement of the trundle bearings assemblies in the starboard SARJ. The final trundle bearing assembly installation was deferred to the fourth EVA, but all other tasks scheduled were accomplished without any issues. Stefanyshyn-Piper's fifth EVA moved her to the twenty-fifth spot in cumulative EVA time with thirty-three hours, forty-two minutes.

On the station, the crews continued to work on transfer operations, and continued work on the water reclamation system. During the Mission Status briefing, lead ISS Flight Director Ginger Kerrick noted that a sample was taken from the Water Processor Assembly that contained 10% urine and 90% condensate, and would be returned to the ground with the shuttle. Kerrick noted that if activation of the system continued on schedule, a sample from the potable water dispenser would be taken on flight day eleven (24 November 2008). The ground crew continued to troubleshoot the Urine Processor Assembly, looking at whether there is a sensor touching part of the system's centrifuge as it rotates, which might be causing it to slow down.

=== 23 November (Flight day 10) ===
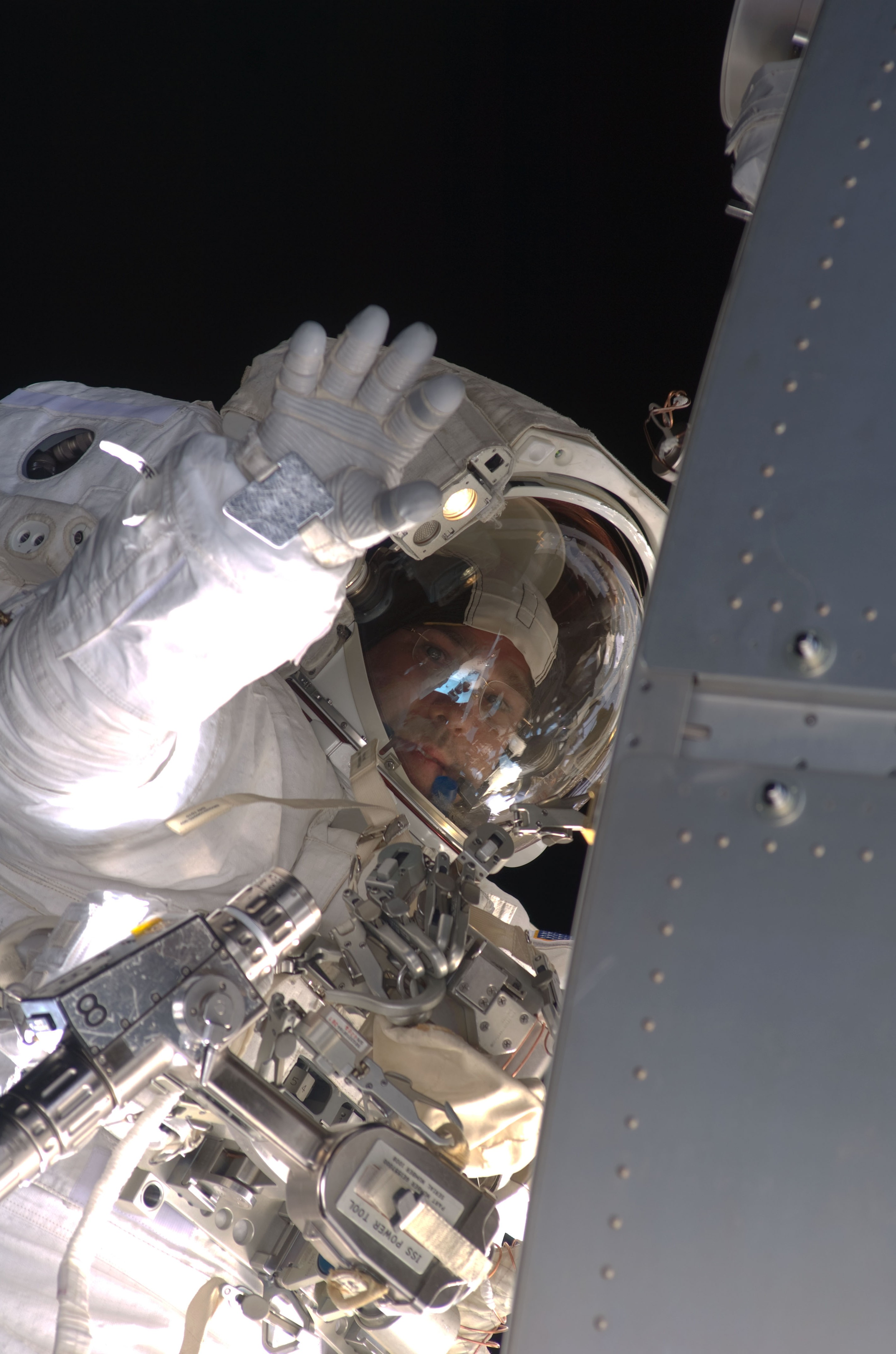
Mission Specialist Stephen Bowen during the mission's final spacewalk

The two crews continued transfer operations, and Finke and Pettit worked together to reconfigure the Urine Processing Assembly (UPA) to try to dampen any vibration that may be contributing to the unit's shutting down prematurely. The unit has continued to operate sporadically, shutting itself down after two to three hours of operations, and the engineers on the ground are still evaluating the possible causes and solutions. Managers on the ground would make a decision on 24 November 2008 on whether to extend Endeavour's mission by one docked day, to help with the troubleshooting of the Water Recovery System (WRS). The Endeavour crew had several hours of off-duty time, and participated in media interviews.

=== 24 November (Flight day 11) ===
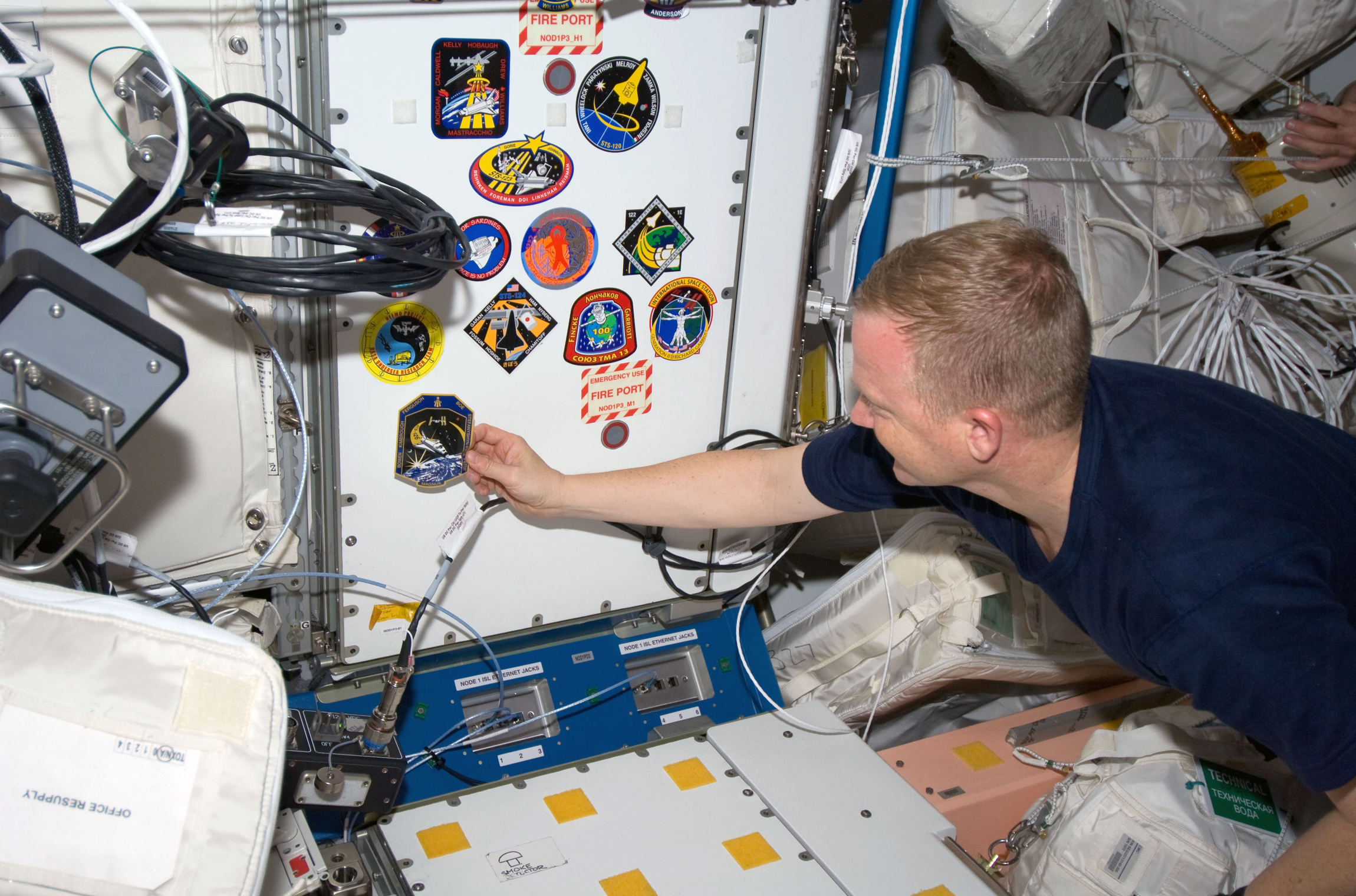
Continuing a long-standing tradition, pilot Eric Boe places the STS-126 patch onto a wall in the Unity node of the International Space Station.

Following the wake-up call, the two crews got to work preparing for the mission's final spacewalk. Bowen and Kimbrough officially began the EVA at 18:24 UTC. Shortly before the spacewalk began, managers on the ground radioed up to the crew that the Mission Management Team had approved an extra docked day of operations for the crews, extending the mission to sixteen days. The extra time was being given to allow the crews more time to resolve the issues with the Urine Processing Assembly. The spacewalk successfully concluded after 6 hours and 7 minutes, bringing the total time spent in EVA activities for the mission to 26 hours, 41 minutes.

=== 25 November (Flight day 12) ===
The crews dedicated most of the day to completing the transfer of supplies from the space station to Endeavour and Leonardo. The starboard Solar Alpha Rotary Joint was automatically tracking the Sun for the first time in more than a year during a three-hour, two-orbit test that was initiated at 10:55 UTC. The Urine Processor Assembly completed its second full five-hour run.

During the Mission Status briefing, International Space Station Program Manager Mike Suffredini noted that the water recycling system appeared to be functioning normally after the modifications performed by the crew on orbit. Additional water samples were taken, and the crew would be bringing home approximately six liters of sample water for extensive testing. The crew on the station would not be drinking any of the water until the engineers and scientists on the ground had a chance to thoroughly analyze the samples taken. Suffredini also noted that while the goal of the EVA activities to perform maintenance on the starboard SARJ was to allow it to operate "periodically", the initial test showed encouraging results, and the lubrication and other work done by the spacewalkers may allow for more routine operations than originally expected. It should be weeks before a more complete assessment could be given, the joint should need to be put through more testing, as well as analysis of the results from engineers on the ground, but Suffredini was encouraged by the initial results.

=== 26 November (Flight day 13) ===
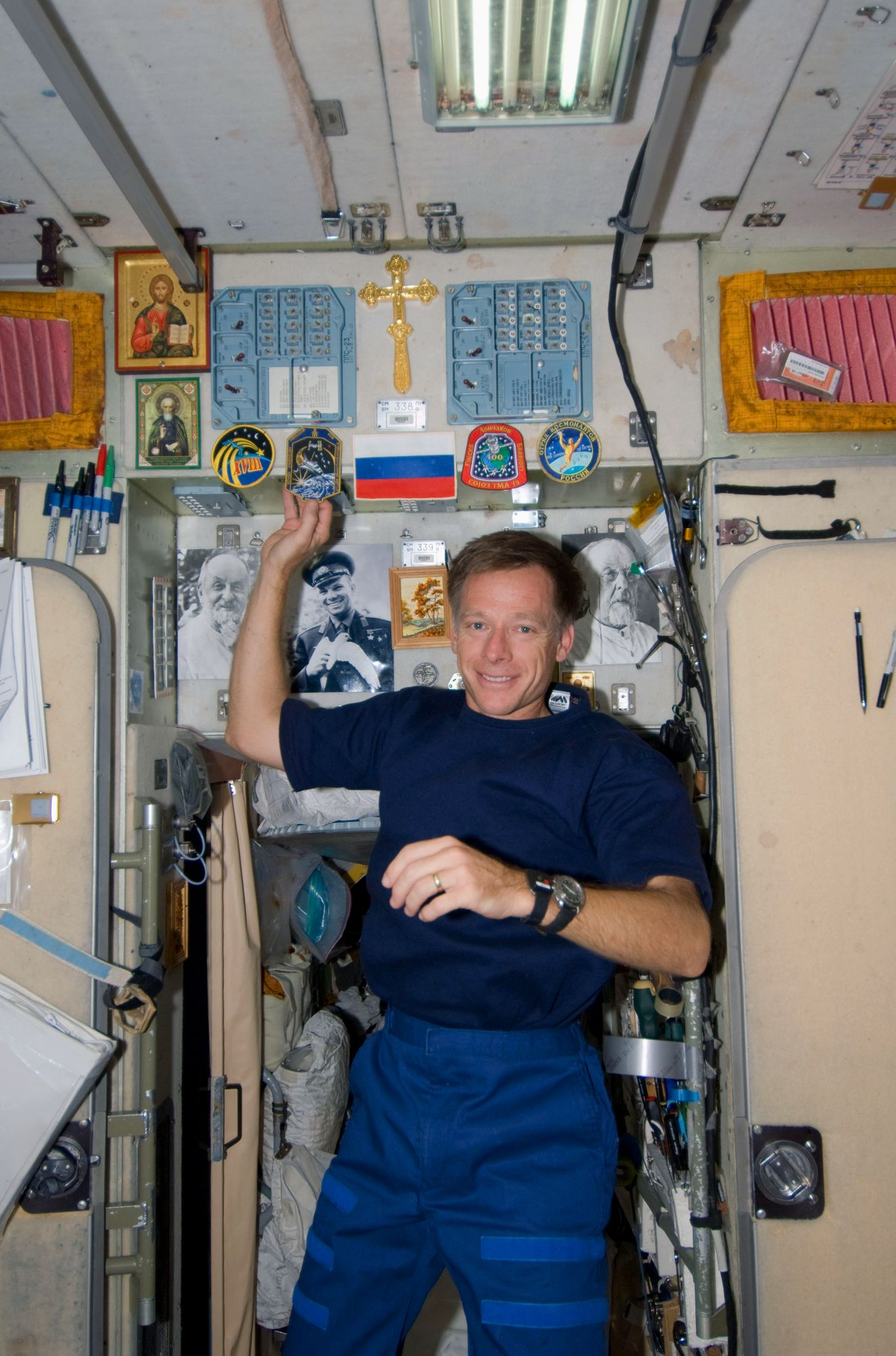
Commander Chris Ferguson continued the long-standing tradition of placing the cloth patch for STS-126 crew in the Zvezda module.

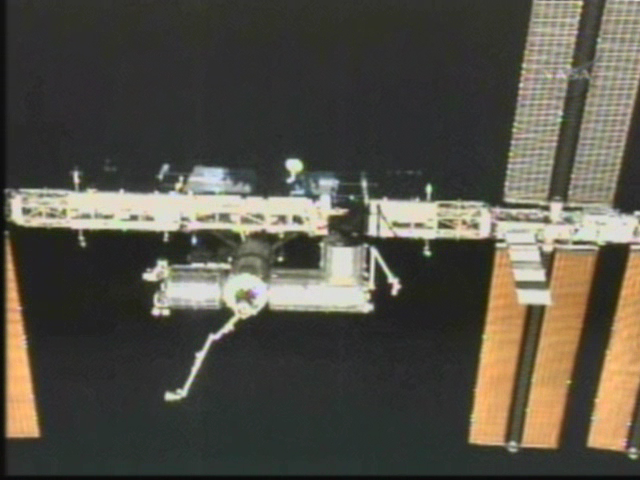
A frame taken from an animation of slow scan TV images taken on a flyaround inspection of the station by the shuttle.

Pettit and Kimbrough used the station's Canadarm2 to move Leonardo from the Harmony module and placed in the shuttle's cargo bay at 21:52 UTC. Stefanyshyn-Piper packed up equipment and supplies used for the four spacewalks and moved them to Endeavour for return, while Magnus continued work on the station's new regenerative life support system. She drained a condensate collection tank to create the optimum ratio of condensate and distillate from the Urine Processor Assembly (UPA), and gathered additional water samples for testing.

=== 27 November (Flight day 14) ===
In their final day of joint operations, the two crews had some off-duty time, spoke to reporters, and shared a Thanksgiving Day meal together. Following the meal, the crews worked on last minute transfers, and gathered in the Harmony node to bid farewell. The hatches between the two vehicles were closed 23:31 UTC, with the crew of Endeavour reviewing the procedures and tools they would use the next day for undocking, scheduled for 14:47 UTC.

=== 28 November (Flight day 15) ===
Endeavour undocked from the International Space Station at 14:47 UTC. The total docked time was 11 days, 16 hours, and 46 minutes, making it the second-longest docked shuttle mission to the station, after STS-123's 11 days, 20 hours and 36 minutes. Pilot Eric Boe maneuvered the shuttle through a flyaround inspection of the complex, but the final separation burn was delayed to avoid bringing the shuttle near the remains of a Russian Cosmos satellite that broke apart in March 2008. While the burn would have only brought them about 11 km (6.8 mi) from the debris, Flight Director Mike Sarafin noted during the Mission Status briefing that "Per the flight rules, it was the safe course of action to not perform that burn". The burn was instead completed at 23:23 UTC. After separating from the station, the crew of Endeavour conducted an inspection of the shuttle's heat shield with the robotic arm, Canadarm.

=== 29 November (Flight day 16) ===
Following the late inspection of Endeavour's heat shield, the Mission Management Team officially cleared the orbiter for re-entry. The crew spent the day preparing for landing, performing inspections and checkout of the shuttle's flight control surfaces and reaction control system thrusters. Near the end of the crew's day, a Department of Defense satellite, Picosat, was deployed. The satellite tested two new types of photovoltaic solar cells, to determine their effectiveness for generating power.

Due to a less than favorable forecast for Kennedy Space Center on 30 November 2008 that was not expected to improve by 1 December 2008, mission managers decided to call up Edwards Air Force Base for the first day of landing opportunities. There were two KSC opportunities, with two more opportunities for Edwards later in the day. If the first two opportunities at KSC were called off due to weather, Bryan Lunney, Entry Flight Director stated during the Mission Status Briefing that they would take the Edwards opportunities; the weather was not likely to improve, so there would be no reason to delay landing for a day. The forecast at KSC called for thunderstorms within 48 km (30 mi) of the landing site, as well as high crosswinds, both conditions that would violate the weather constraints for landing. (Note: Winters, Kathy (September 2006). "Ask The Mission Team – Question and Answer Session". NASA.)

=== 30 November (Flight day 17, Landing) ===
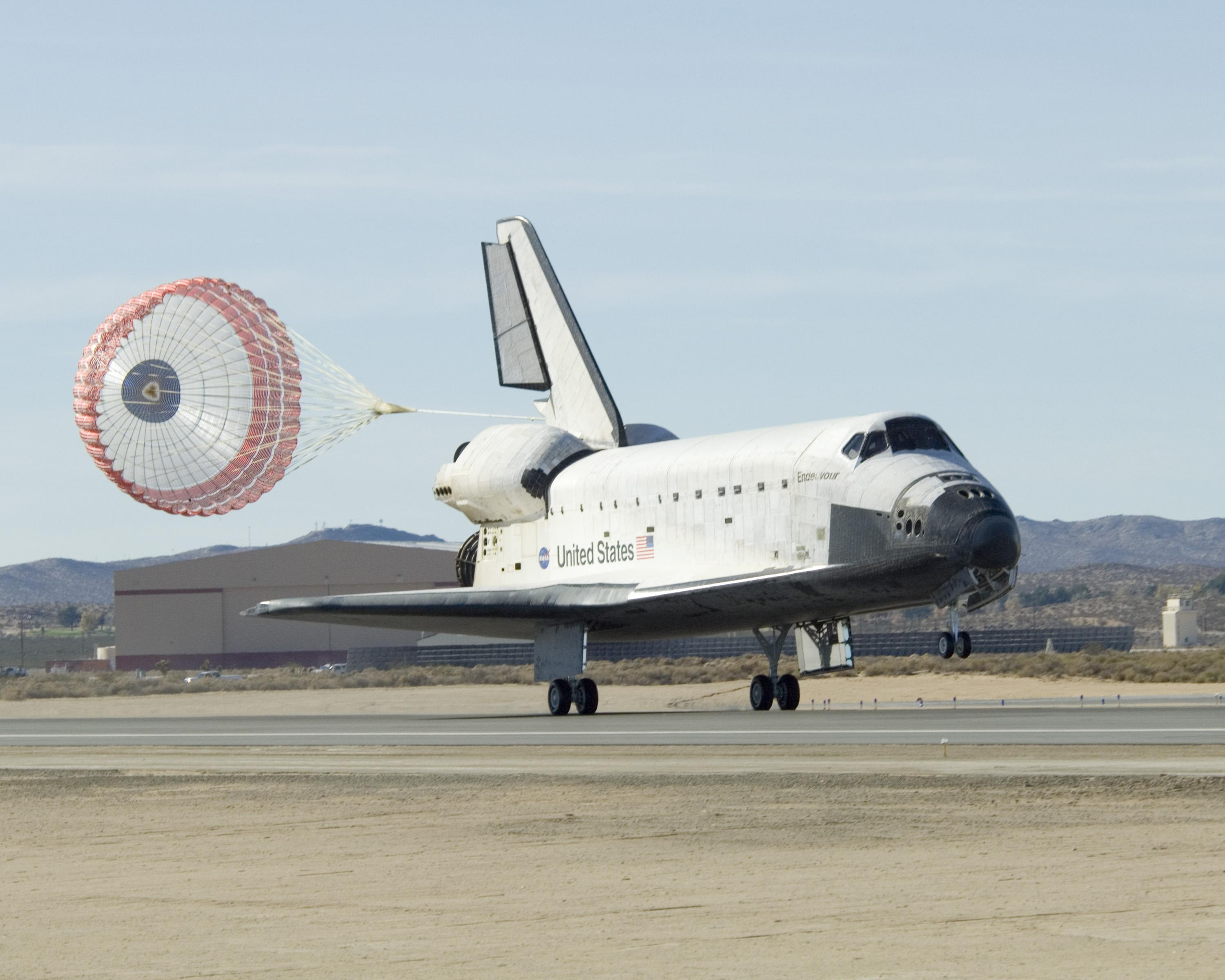
Space shuttle Endeavour and the STS-126 crew land at Edwards Air Force Base, California after completing a mission to the International Space Station.

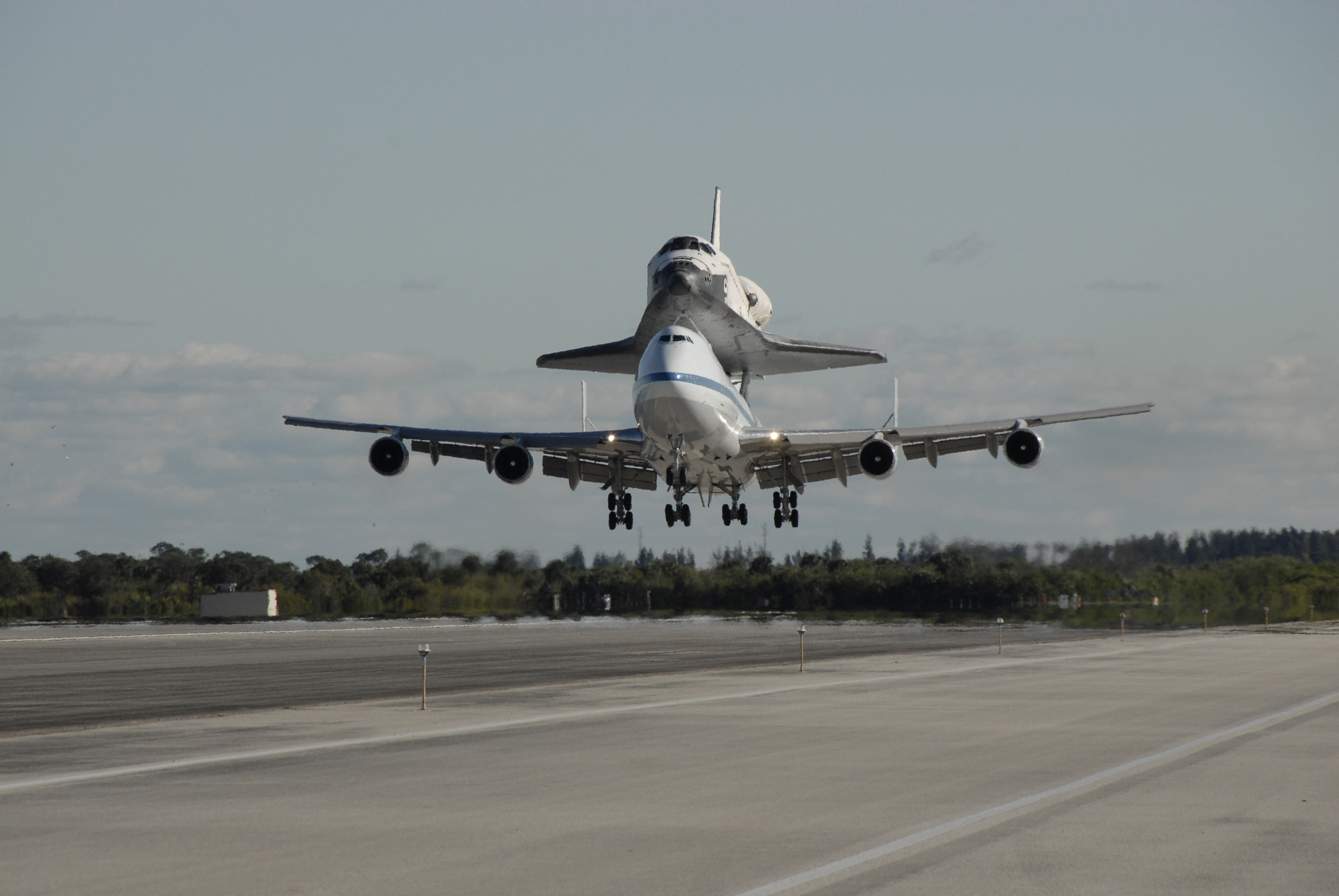
Endeavour lands back at Kennedy Space Center atop the 747 Shuttle Carrier Aircraft.

After awakening, the crew of Endeavour got to work preparing for reentry. While working through the deorbit timeline, Entry Flight Director Bryan Lunney, after reviewing the weather, waved off the first KSC landing opportunity due to excessive crosswinds on the runway. After evaluating the weather, the second KSC landing opportunity was also waved off, as the weather was "no go" and forecasted "no go" per the landing weather requirements. Lunney continued to watch the weather for possible changes in Monday's weather forecast prior to making the decision whether to land at Edwards, or wait one day to get a Kennedy landing, but following further analysis of the projected weather in Florida for Monday, Lunney decided to take the first Edwards Air Force Base landing opportunity. The deorbit burn was initiated at 20:19 UTC, and the orbiter landed at Edwards Air Force Base at 21:25 UTC.

STS-126 was the only mission to land on the temporary runway 04 at Edwards Air Force Base, as the main runway was completing refurbishment. The use of the temporary runway required new braking and rollout techniques that have never been used before, as the runway is 910 m (2,990 ft) shorter than the normal runway. This was the last landing at Edwards for Endeavour.

Endeavour was returned to Florida on top of one of NASA's Shuttle Carrier Aircraft, arriving back at the Kennedy Space Center on 12 December 2008 after a three-day cross-country trip.

== Extravehicular activity (EVA) ==
Four spacewalks were scheduled and completed during STS-126. The cumulative time in extravehicular activity during the mission was 26 hours and 41 minutes.

EVA	Spacewalkers	Start (UTC)	End (UTC)	Duration
EVA 1	Heidemarie M. Stefanyshyn-Piper; Stephen G. Bowen	18 November 2008; 18:09	19 November 2008; 01:01	6 hours, 52 minutes
EVA 1	Transferred an empty nitrogen tank assembly from ESP-3 to the shuttle's cargo bay, transferred a new flex hose rotary coupler to ESP-3 for future use, removed an insulation cover on the Kibō External Facility berthing mechanism, began cleaning and lubrication of the starboard Solar Alpha Rotary Joint (SARJ), and replacement of eleven trundle bearing assemblies.			
EVA 2	Stefanyshyn-Piper; Robert S. Kimbrough	20 November 2008; 17:58	21 November 2008; 00:43	6 hours, 45 minutes
EVA 2	Relocated two Crew and Equipment Translation Aid (CETA) carts from the starboard side of the Mobile Transporter to the port side, lubricated the station robotic arm's Latching End Effector (LEE) "A" snare bearings, continued cleaning and lubrication of the starboard SARJ.			
EVA 3	Stefanyshyn-Piper; Bowen	22 November 2008; 18:01	23 November 2008; 00:58	6 hours, 57 minutes
EVA 3	Completed cleaning, lubrication, and replacement of all but one of the trundle bearing assemblies on the starboard SARJ. The final TBA will be replaced during EVA 4.			
EVA 4	Bowen; Kimbrough	24 November 2008; 18:24	25 November 2008; 00:31	6 hours, 7 minutes
EVA 4	Completed replacement of trundle bearing assemblies on starboard SARJ, lubricated the port SARJ, installed a video camera, re‐installed insulation covers on the Kibō External Facility berthing mechanism, performed Kibō robotic arm grounding tab maintenance, installed spacewalk handrails on Kibō, installed Global Positioning Satellite (GPS) antennae on Kibō, photographed radiators, and photographed trailing umbilical system cables.			

== Wake-up calls ==
NASA began a tradition of playing music to astronauts during Project Gemini and have been using it to wake up a flight crew since Apollo 15. Each track is specially chosen, often by their families, and usually has a special meaning to an individual member of the crew, or is applicable to their daily activities.

Flight Day	Song	Artist/Composer	Played for	Links
Day 2	Shelter	Xavier Rudd	Christopher Ferguson	WAV MP3; TRANSCRIPT
Day 3	Start Me Up	the Rolling Stones	Sandra Magnus	WAV MP3; TRANSCRIPT
Day 4	London Calling	the Clash	Steve Bowen	WAV MP3; TRANSCRIPT
Day 5	City of Blinding Lights	U2	Shane Kimbrough	WAV MP3; TRANSCRIPT
Day 6	Fanfare for the Common Man	Aaron Copland	Eric Boe	WAV MP3; TRANSCRIPT
Day 7	Summertime	Bandella	Don Pettit	WAV MP3; TRANSCRIPT
Day 8	Unharness Your Horses, Boys	The Ukrainians	Heidemarie Stefanyshyn-Piper	WAV MP3; TRANSCRIPT
Day 9	You Are Here	Dutton	Shane Kimbrough	WAV MP3; TRANSCRIPT
Day 10	Can't Take My Eyes Off You	Frankie Valli	Christopher Ferguson	WAV MP3; TRANSCRIPT
Day 11	Can't Stop Loving You	Van Halen	Heidemarie Stefanyshyn-Piper	WAV MP3; TRANSCRIPT
Day 12	Fever	Bandella	Donald Pettit	WAV MP3; TRANSCRIPT
Day 13	North Sea Oil	Jethro Tull	Steve Bowen	WAV MP3; TRANSCRIPT
Day 14	Hold On Tight	Electric Light Orchestra	Heidemarie Stefanyshyn-Piper	WAV MP3; TRANSCRIPT
Day 15	In the Meantime	Spacehog	Eric Boe	WAV MP3; TRANSCRIPT
Day 16	Twinkle, Twinkle, Little Star		Gregory Chamitoff	WAV MP3; TRANSCRIPT
Day 17	Gonna Fly Now	Bill Conti	Christopher Ferguson	WAV MP3; TRANSCRIPT

== Contingency mission ==
The Contingency Shuttle Crew Support mission which would have been launched in the event that Endeavour became disabled during STS-126 would have been performed by Discovery. It would have been a modified version of the STS-119 mission of Discovery, which would have involved the launch date being brought forward, but the goal would have been to carry STS-119's full payload and complete the mission as planned, in addition to rescuing the crew of STS-126.

== Media ==
Space Shuttle Endeavour launches from launch pad 39A at Kennedy Space Center as part of the STS-126 mission

== See also ==
- 2008 in spaceflight
- List of human spaceflights
- List of International Space Station spacewalks
- List of Space Shuttle missions
- List of spacewalks 2000–2014
- Outline of space science
- Space Shuttle program
