= Bøe =

Bøe is a Norwegian surname. Notable people with the surname include:

- Alf Bøe (1927–2010), Norwegian art historian
- Anne Bøe (born 1956), Norwegian poet
- Anette Bøe (born 1957), Norwegian cross-country skier
- Christine Bøe Jensen (born 1975), Norwegian footballer
- Eirik Glambek Bøe (born 1975), Norwegian musician
- Frants Diderik Bøe (1820–1891), Norwegian painter
- Gunnar Bøe (1917–1989), Norwegian politician
- Gunvald Bøe (1904–1967), Norwegian historian
- Johannes A. Bøe (1882–1970), Norwegian politician
- Johannes P. Bøe (1774–1859), Norwegian politician
- Magnus Bøe (born 1998), South Korean-Norwegian cross-country skier
- Morten Bøe (born 1971), Norwegian archer
- Ragnar Bøe Elgsaas (born 1971), Norwegian politician
