= Fran =

Fran may refer to:

== People and fictional characters ==
- Fran (given name), including a list of people and fictional characters
- Fran (footballer, born 1969), Francisco Javier González Pérez, Spanish football manager and former midfielder
- Fran (footballer, born June 1972), Francisco José Figueroa Alonso, Spanish football right-back and midfielder
- Fran (footballer, born August 1972), Francisco José Nogueira Maneiro, Spanish football forward
- Fran (footballer, born February 1992), Spanish footballer Francisco Pérez Gil
- Fran (footballer, born May 1992), Brazilian footballer Francisco Teocharis Papaiordanou Filho
- Fran (footballer, born 1995), Spanish footballer Francisco José Rodríguez Gaitán
- Carol Fran (1933–2021), American soul blues singer, pianist and songwriter Carol Augustus Anthony
- Jan Fran (born 1985), Lebanese-Australian journalist and presenter Jeanette Francis
- José Fran (born 1992), Spanish footballer José Francisco Agulló Sevilla
- Patrick Fran (born 1974), Filipino former basketball player and coach

== Other uses ==
- Tropical Storm Fran, a list of hurricanes, typhoons, tropical storms and a cyclone in the Atlantic or western Pacific Oceans
- Fran (film), a 1985 Australian film
- Fran (comics), a 2013 graphic novel by Jim Woodring
- Fran (band), an American indie rock band

== See also ==
- Dennis Franchione (born 1951), college football coach known as Coach Fran
- US FRAN, a Burkinabé football club based in Bobo Dioulasso
