= Archie R. Boe =

Former president of Sears

Archie R. Boe (born 1921 in Estherville, Iowa - d. January 2, 1989 in Chicago, Illinois) was a former president of Sears, Roebuck and Co. and Allstate Insurance Co.

== Career ==
Boe graduated from Drake University in 1941 with a degree in finance, and earned a master's degree in business from the University of Chicago.

In 1966 Boe was named President of Allstate Insurance, and became the company's chairman and executive officer in 1972. In 1982 he became the president of Sears, a post he held for two years. Boe retired in 1984. He was inducted into the Chicago Business Hall of Fame in 1987, and served on several corporate boards.

Boe was also the author of Allstate: The Story of the Good Hands Company.

== Death ==
Archie Boe died of cancer at age 67. He was survived by his wife, son, stepson, two stepdaughters and four grandchildren.
