= Board of Equalization =

Board of Equalization may refer to:

- California State Board of Equalization
- Oklahoma State Board of Equalization
