= Fran (band) =

American indie rock band

Fran is an American indie rock band from Chicago, Illinois.

== Career ==
Frontwoman Maria Jacobson grew up interested in theater, however, became "fed up" with it after college. While in college, Jacobson purchased a guitar for herself to learn how to play while working at a repertory theater. After graduating from college, Jacobson moved to Mexico where she taught English. While in Mexico, Jacobson began writing music. Upon returning home from her career in Mexico, Jacobson decided to start a band. In 2015, Jacobson and her band released their first EP, More Enough. On September 17, 2019, Fran released the first single off their then upcoming debut album, titled "Company". On October 15, Fran released the second single from the album, "So Surreal". On November 5, Fran released the third single from the album, titled "In My Own Time". Fran's debut album, A Private Picture, was released on November 15, 2019. The album received positive reviews.

Fran's second album, Leaving, was released in January 2023.

== Band members ==
- Maria Jacobson (vocals)
- Mike Altergott (guitar)
- Atticus Lazenby (bassist-keyboardist)
- Raul Cotaquispe (drums)

== Discography ==
=== Studio albums ===
- A Private Picture (2019, Fire Talk)
- Leaving (2023, Fire Talk)

=== EP ===
- More Enough (2017, Lake Paradise)
