= Eric Boe =

American astronaut (born 1964)

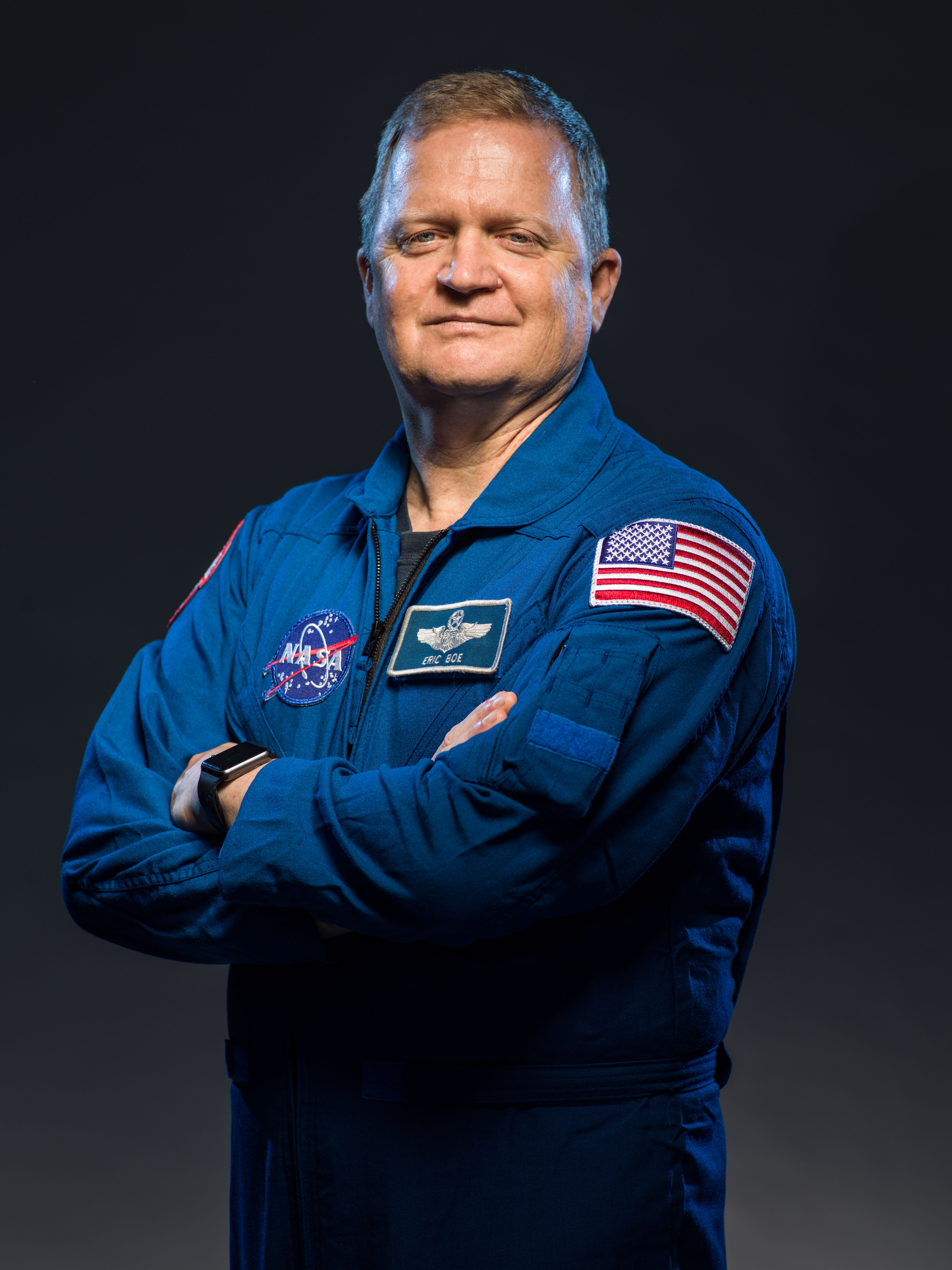
- Born: Eric Allen Boe; October 1, 1964 (age 62); Miami, Florida, U.S.
- Education: United States Air Force Academy (BS); Georgia Institute of Technology (MS)
- Space career

NASA astronaut
- Rank: Colonel, USAF
- Time in space: 28d 15h 34m
- Selection: NASA Group 18 (2000)
- Missions: STS-126; STS-133
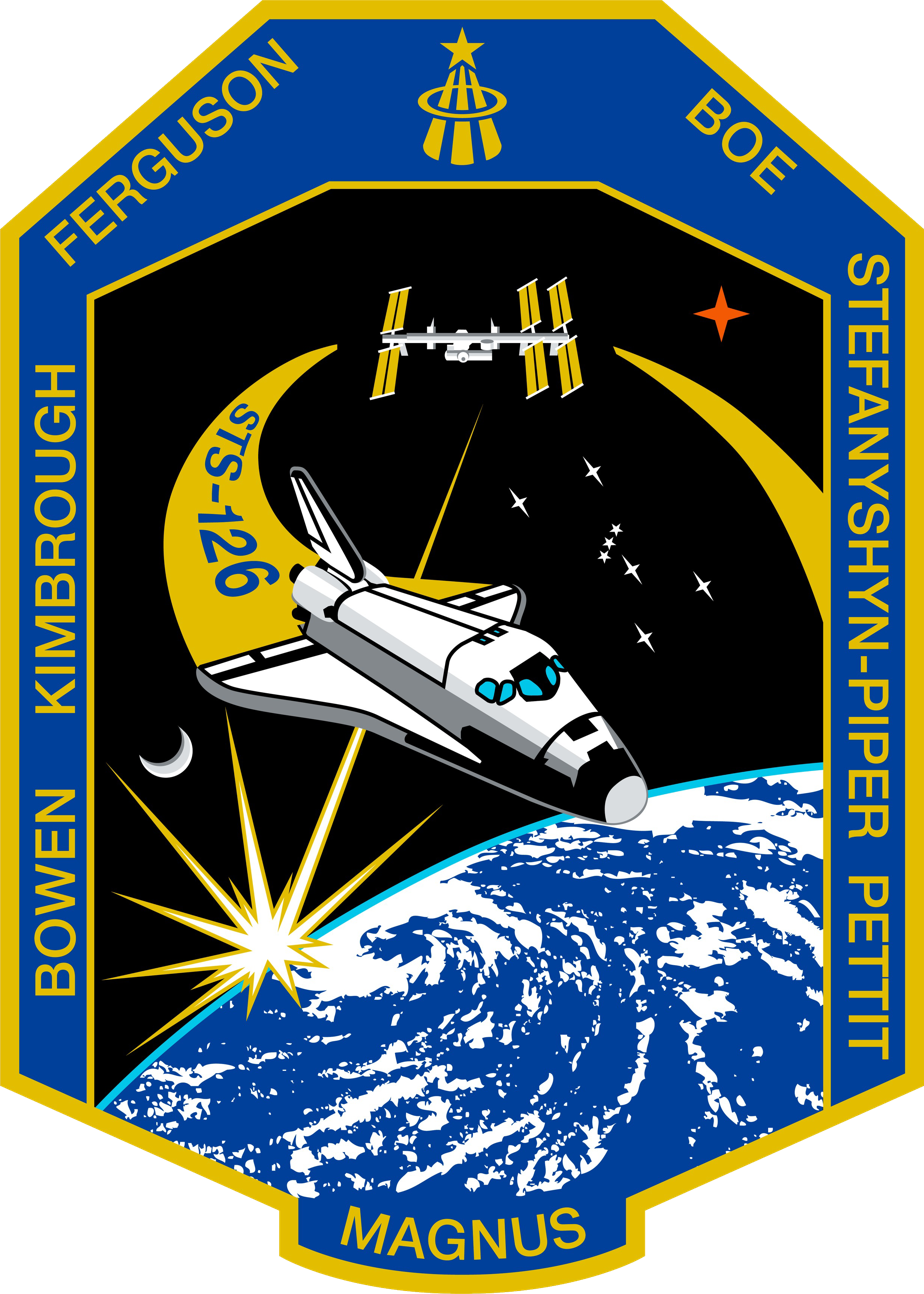
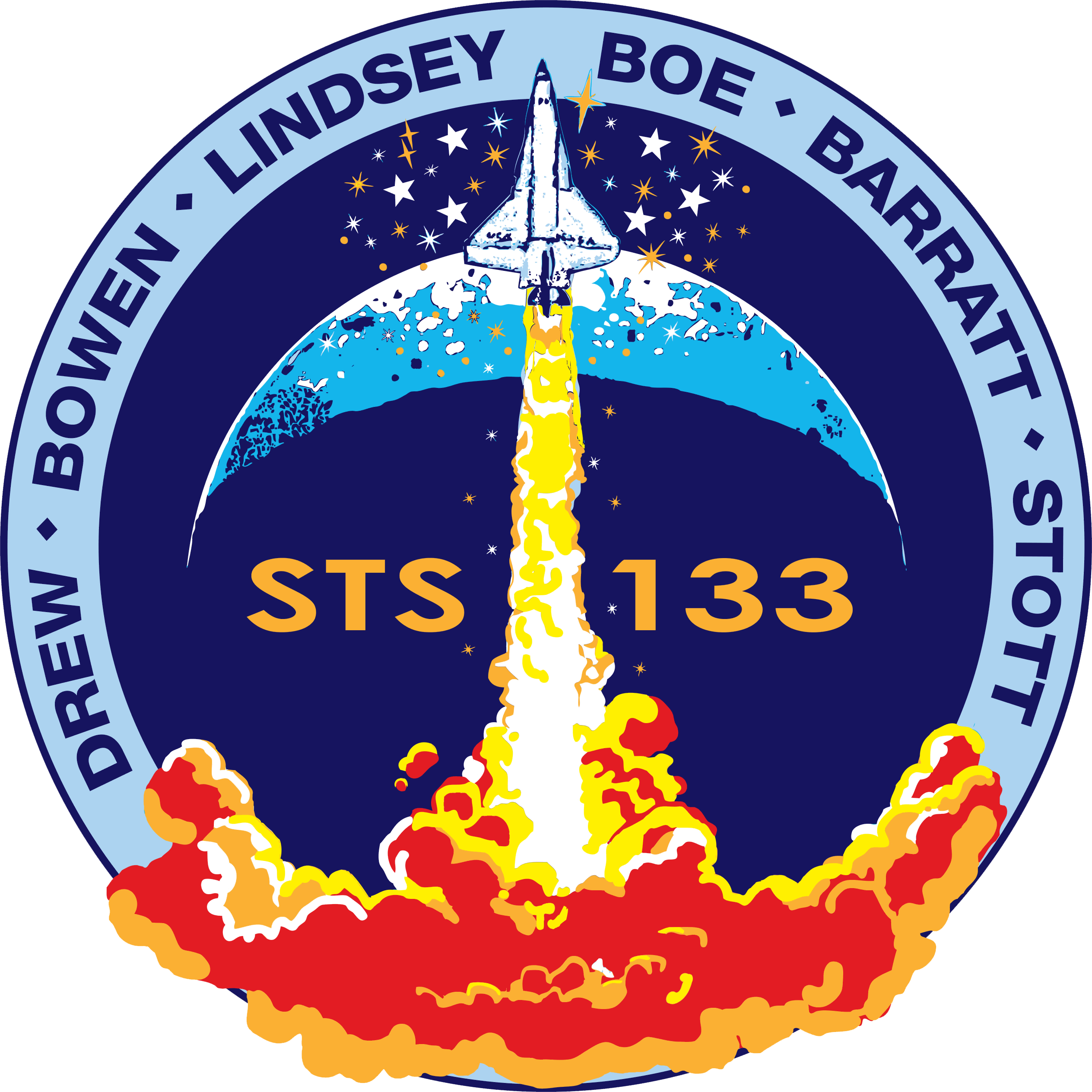
- Mission insignia

Eric Allen Boe (born October 1, 1964) is a retired United States Air Force fighter pilot, colonel, and test pilot, and an active NASA astronaut. He flew as the pilot of Space Shuttle missions STS-126 and STS-133.

== Early life and education ==
Boe was born in Miami, Florida, and grew up in Atlanta, Georgia. He graduated from Henderson High School, Tucker, Georgia, in 1983. He was a cadet in the Georgia Wing of the Civil Air Patrol. While a cadet, Eric Boe earned the General Carl A Spaatz Award, the highest award given to Civil Air Patrol cadets. Boe remains a senior member in the Texas Wing of the Civil Air Patrol, along with his son, who recently became a cadet. He earned a Bachelor of Science degree in astronautical engineering from the United States Air Force Academy in 1987, and a Master of Science degree in electrical engineering from the Georgia Institute of Technology in 1997. He is married to the former Kristen Newman of Thousand Oaks, California, and they have two children.

== Military career ==
Boe was commissioned from the U.S. Air Force Academy in 1987. He completed Euro-NATO Joint Jet Pilot Training (ENJJPT) at Sheppard Air Force Base, Texas in 1988. Following transition training in the F-4 Phantom II, he was then assigned to the 3d Tactical Fighter Squadron at Clark Air Base in the Philippines as a combat-ready pilot in the F-4E. In 1991, he served as a T-38 instructor pilot in the 50th Flying Training Squadron, and as an AT-38B instructor pilot in the 49th Fighter Training Squadron at Columbus AFB, Mississippi. In 1994, following transition training in the F-15 Eagle at Tyndall AFB, Florida, he was assigned to the 33rd Fighter Wing's 60th Fighter Squadron at Eglin AFB, Florida, serving as a flight commander in the F-15C. He flew 55 combat missions over Iraq in support of Operation Southern Watch after the first Gulf War. In 1997, he attended the USAF Test Pilot School at Edwards AFB, California. After graduation, he was assigned as the director of test, Air-to-Air Missile Test Division, 46th Test Wing, Eglin AFB, where he served as a test pilot flying the A/B/C/D and E models of the F-15 and the UH-1N helicopter. He has logged over 6,000 flight hours in more than 50 different aircraft.

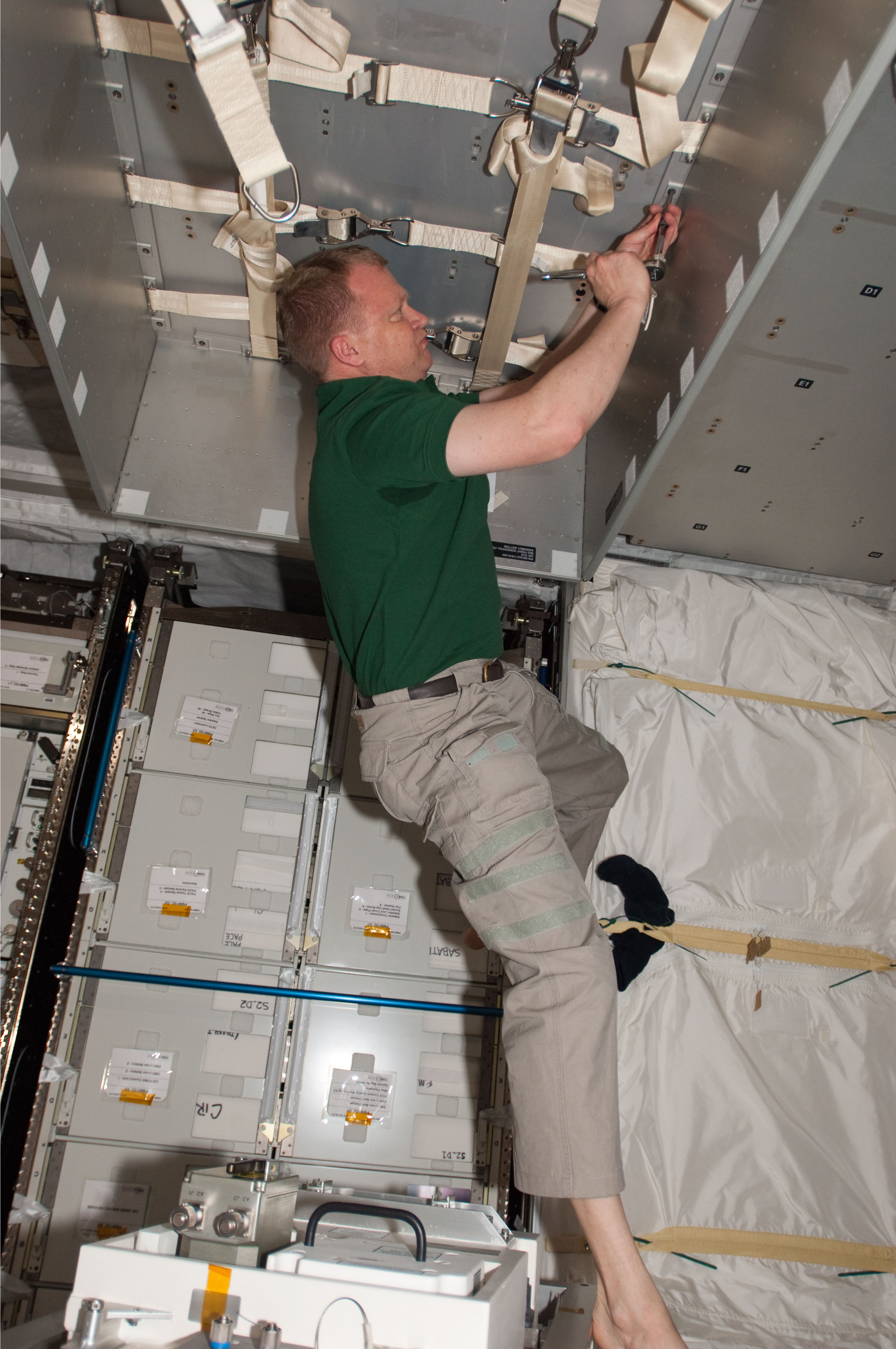
Boe working aboard the International Space Station during the STS-133 mission.

== NASA career ==
Selected as an astronaut candidate by NASA in July 2000, Boe reported to the Johnson Space Center in August 2000. Following the completion of two years of training and evaluation, he was assigned technical duties in the Astronaut Office Advanced Vehicles Branch and Station Operations Branch. His current technical assignment involves work with displays and controls for future space vehicles. He made his first trip to space as pilot of Space Shuttle Endeavour during STS-126 on November 14, 2008. Boe flew his second space flight as pilot on STS-133, the final scheduled flight of the Space Shuttle Discovery and the third-to-last flight of the Space Shuttle program.

In August 2012, Boe was named Deputy Chief of the Astronaut Office.

In July 2015, NASA announced Boe as one of the first astronauts for U.S. Commercial spaceflights. Subsequently, he has started working with Boeing and SpaceX to train in their commercial crew vehicles, along with the other chosen astronauts – Sunita Williams, Robert Behnken and Doug Hurley. In August 2018, he was assigned to Boe-CFT, the first test flight of the Boeing CST-100 Starliner. On January 22, 2019, NASA announced that Boe was unable to fly for medical reasons and replaced him with Michael Fincke.

== Awards and honors ==
Boe is a distinguished graduate with honors from the United States Air Force Academy, and was awarded the Fannie and John Hertz Foundation Fellowship for graduate studies.

In addition to his current U.S. Air Force aeronautical rating of Command Pilot/Astronaut, his personal military decorations and service awards include:

- Defense Meritorious Service Medal
- Meritorious Service Medal
- Air Medals (2 awards)
- Aerial Achievement Medals (5 awards)
- Air Force Commendation Medals (3 awards)
- Air Force Achievement Medal
- Combat Readiness Medal
- Air Force Outstanding Unit Awards (3 awards)
- National Defense Service Medals (2 awards)
- Armed Forces Expeditionary Medal
- War on Terrorism Service Medal
