= Alf Bøe =

Norwegian art historian (1927–2010)

Alf Bøe (8 September 1927 – 8 June 2010) was a Norwegian art historian, educator, curator and author.

== Biography ==
Bøe was born in Bergen, Norway. He was the son of Johannes Bøe (1891–1971) and Dagny Godager (1896–1982). His father was a professor of archeology at the University Museum of Bergen.

Bøe attended Wadham College, Oxford University during 1954 under a Norwegian Oxford Scholarship. He earned a Bachelor of Letters degree on the basis of his thesis From Gothic Revival to Functional Form: A Study in Victorian Theories of Design. He received his mag.art. and cand.philol. degrees at the University of Oslo in 1955. He also studied at École du Louvre from 1956 to 1957.

From 1959 to 1962 he was a curator at the Nordenfjeldske Museum of Crafts and Design (Nordenfjeldske Kunstindustrimuseum) in Trondheim. From 1962 to 1968 he was the head curator at the Norwegian Museum of Decorative Arts and Design in Oslo. He was the director of the Norwegian Design Center (Norsk Designcentrum) in Oslo from 1968 to 1973, a lecturer in art history at the University of Oslo from 1973 to 1976, and then the director of Oslo municipality's art collections from 1976 to 1995.

Bøe was a member of the International Council of Museums and was associated with the Brukskunst Association (Foreningen Brukskunst). He also held a number of directorships in cultural institutions. He was president of the Association of Applied Arts (Foreningen Brukskunst) and the Scandinavian Museums Association (Skandinavisk Museumsforbund). He was chairman of the Norwegian Art and Cultural History Museum (Norske kunst- og kulturhistoriske museer), the Society for the Welfare of Oslo (Selskabet for Oslo Byes Vel) and the Norwegian National Academy of Craft and Art Industry(Statens håndverks- og kunstindustriskole).

Bøe wrote books on a variety of art history related topics. His bachelor's thesis From Gothic Revival to Functional Form (published by Oslo University Press, Oslo, 1957) is available internationally and remains his best known work. Other books include Om filigran (1959 with Thale Riisøen), Norwegian Industrial Design (1963), Porsgrunds Porselænsfabrik (1967), Den norske designpris (1969), Samliv med fortiden (1976) and Edvard Munch (1992). He contributed to volumes five, six and seven of Norges kunsthistorie.

== Personal life ==
He was married to Kari Færden from 1955 to 1972. In 1972 he married Ulla Tarras-Wahlberg. He received the Oslo City Culture Award (Oslo bys kulturpris) in 1996 and Norsk Forms Honors Award (Norsk Forms Hederspris) in 1999. He was decorated as a Knight of the Royal Norwegian Order of St. Olav in 1992 and as an Officer of the Order of the British Empire in 1998. He died during 2010 in Oslo.
