= Frants Diderik Bøe =

Norwegian painter

Frants Bøe
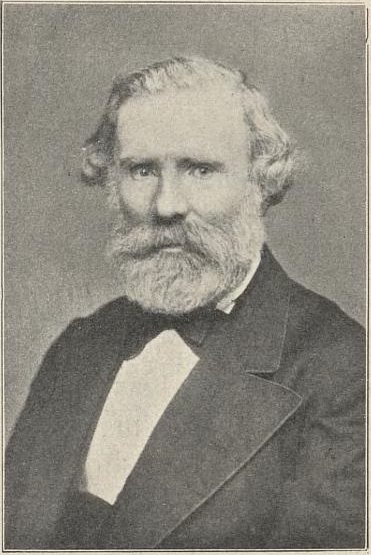
- 200px
- Born: Frants Diderik Bøe; 26 May 1810; Bergen, Norway
- Died: 13 November 1891 (aged 71); Bergen, Norway
- Education: Royal Danish Academy of Fine Arts
- Known for: Painting

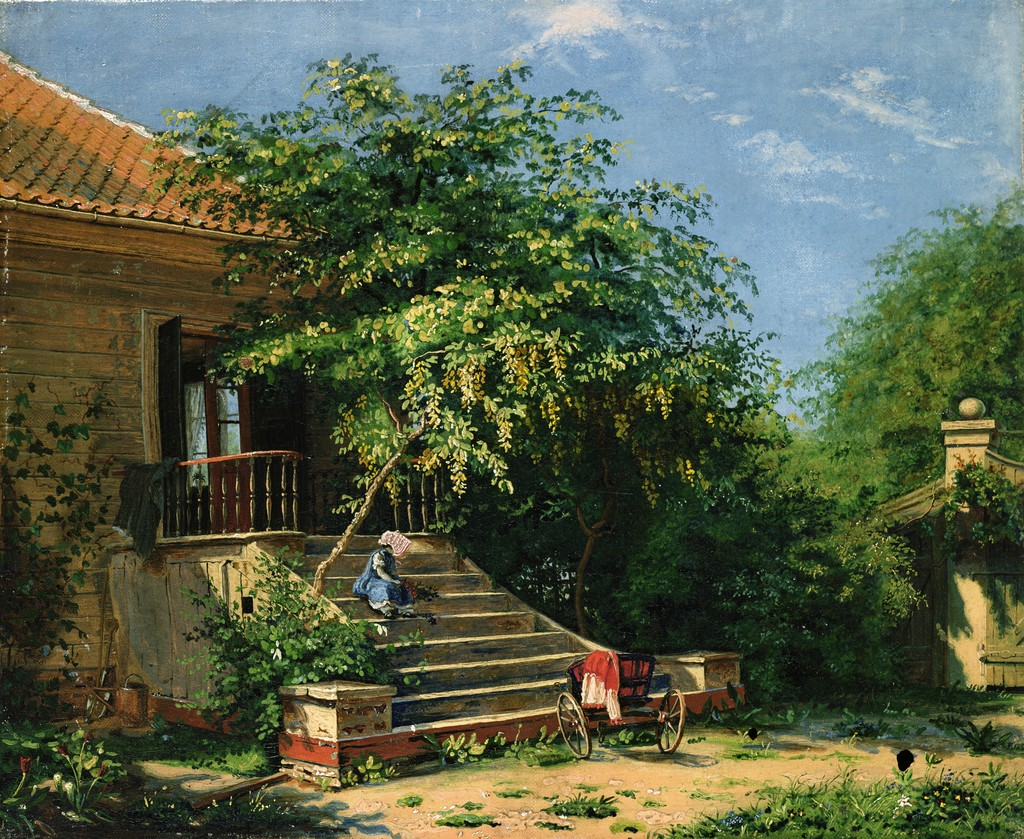
Hagetrapp ved Blegedammen, 1892

Frants Diderik Bøe(28 May 1820 — 13 November 1891) was a Norwegian painter, who specialized in still life and landscapes.

== Biography ==
Frants Diderik Bøe was born and grew up in Bergen, Norway, as the second oldest of seven siblings. Encouraged by the local artistic community, including Johan Christian Dahl, he moved to Copenhagen where he enrolled in the Royal Danish Academy of Fine Arts. There he studied with the architect Gustav Friedrich Hetsch and sculptor Herman Wilhelm Bissen. He also trained with artist, Christen Købke. In 1849, he moved to Paris, where he studied under the expatriate Danish painter Theude Grønland (1817–1876). Starting in 1852, his vision became impaired from eye disease which would come to effect his later works.

After eight years in Paris, he returned to Norway. He lived in Nordland from 1858 to 1861 and from 1863 to 1864, principally painting landscapes and scenes from nature. He married Hanna Maria Arnesen, a teacher from Lofoten, in 1864. Later that year, the couple moved to Bergen where he lived the rest of his life. His work is featured in several public art museums, principally within Norway. Notable collections are featured at the National Gallery in Oslo, Bergen Billedgalleri and Oscarshall in Oslo.

== Awards ==
- Honorable Mention - Salonen Paris, 1852
- Silver and bronze medal - Exposition Universelle. 1855
- Medal - Wien World Exhibition, 1873

== Gallery ==
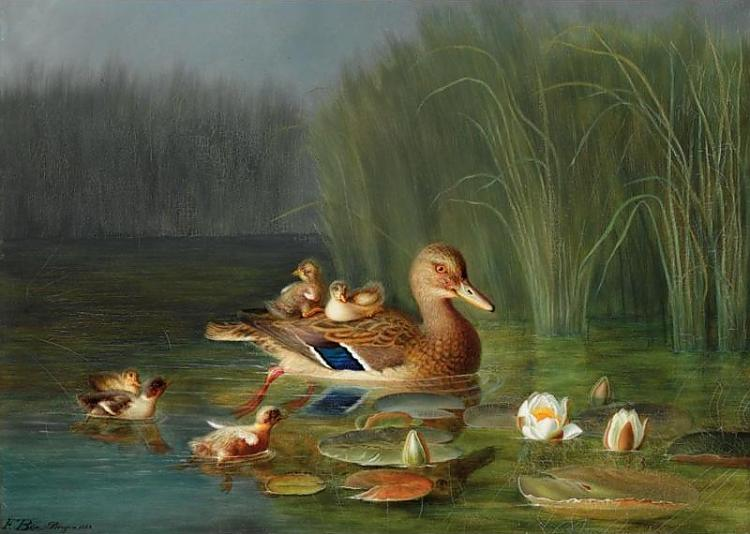
Wild Ducks, 1883

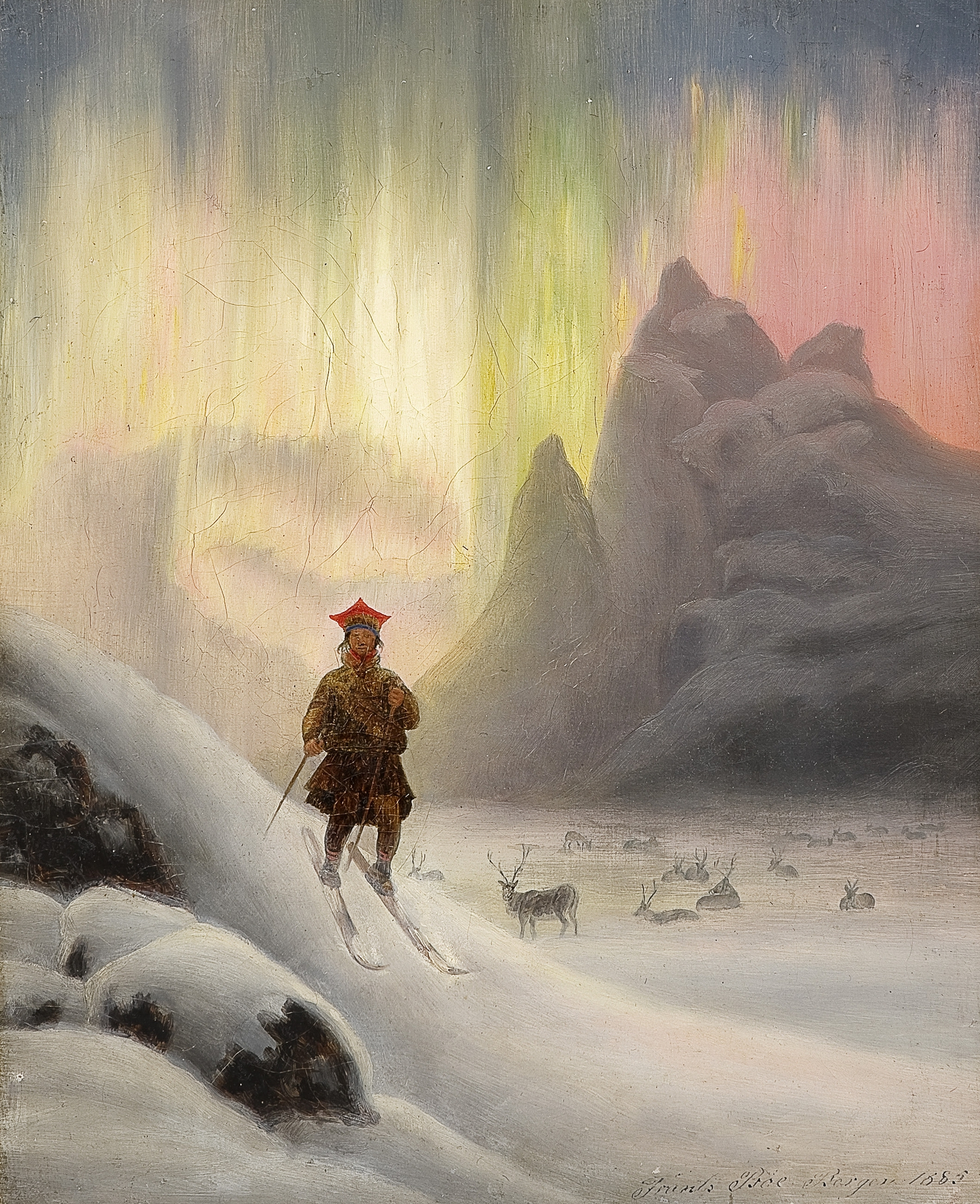
Skiing Lapp with the
Northern Lights, 1885

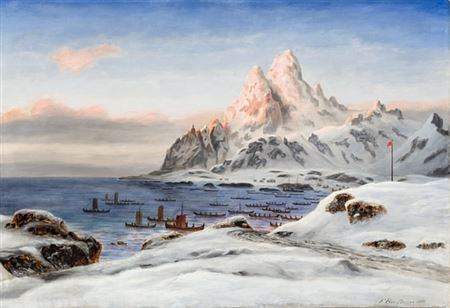
Fishermen in Lofoten, 1887

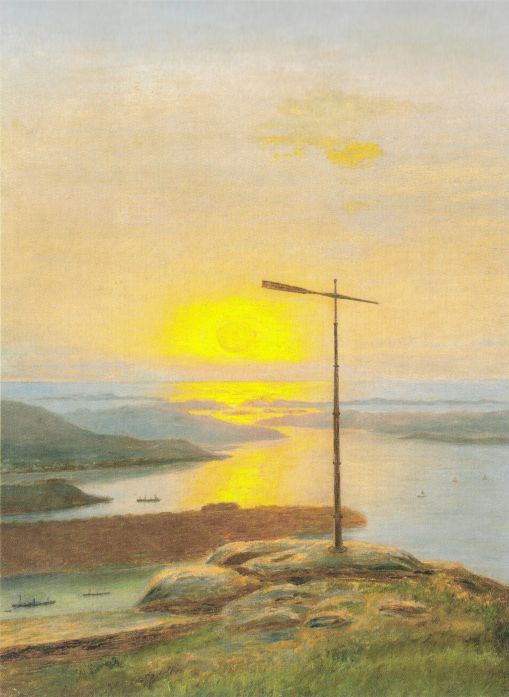
Sandviksfjellet, Bergen, circa 1891

== Other sources ==
- Dietrichson, Lorentz (1991) Norges kunsts historie i det nittende arhundre (Oslo: Messel Forlag AS) ISBN 978-8276310009
