= List of human spaceflights =

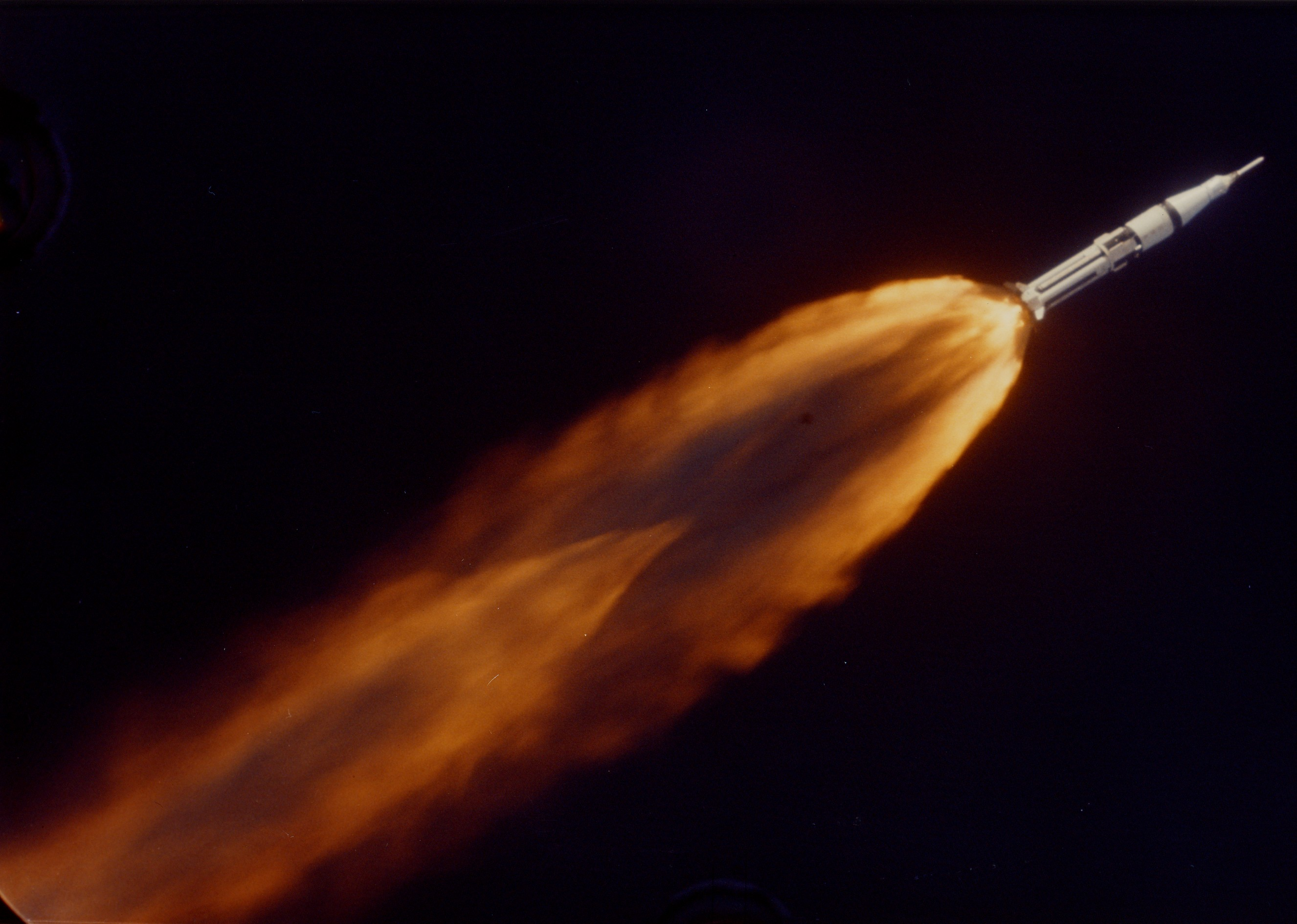
Apollo 7 heads into orbit with its crew of three, 1968

This is a list of all crewed spaceflights throughout history. Beginning in 1961 with the flight of Yuri Gagarin aboard Vostok 1, crewed spaceflight occurs when a human crew flies a spacecraft into outer space. Human spaceflight is distinguished from spaceflight generally, which entails both crewed and uncrewed spacecraft.

There are two definitions of spaceflight. The Fédération Aéronautique Internationale (FAI), an international record-keeping body, defines the boundary between Earth's atmosphere and outer space at 100 kilometers (62 mi) above sea level. This boundary is known as the Kármán line. The United States awards astronaut wings to qualified personnel who pilot a spaceflight above an altitude of 50 miles (80 km).

As of the launch of SpaceX Crew-13 on 1 October 2026, there have been 416 human spaceflights.

- Three of these were launched without crew but returned crew to Earth after damage to the crew's original vehicle. These were Soyuz 34, Soyuz MS-23 and Shenzhou 22.
- Two missions did not cross either the Kármán line or the U.S. definition of space and therefore do not qualify as spaceflights. These were the fatal STS-51-L (Challenger disaster), and the non-fatal aborted Soyuz mission T-10a.
- Two non-fatal aborted missions crossed either the Kármán line or the U.S. definition of space. One was the Soyuz mission MS-10, which did not reach the Kármán line but did pass the 80 km (50 mi) line. The other was the Soyuz mission 18a, which crossed the Kármán line.
- Four missions successfully achieved human spaceflight, yet ended as fatal failures as their crews died during the return. These were Soyuz 1, X-15 flight 191, Soyuz 11, and STS-107 (Columbia disaster).
- Twenty four flights in total reached an apogee beyond 80 km (50 mi), but failed to go beyond 100 km (62 mi), so therefore do not qualify as spaceflights under the FAI definition.

== Summary ==
Since 1961, three countries (China, Russia, and the United States) and one former country (Soviet Union) have conducted human spaceflight using seventeen different spacecraft series, or: "programs", "projects".

Entity	Soviet Union (1961–1991) / Russia (1992–present)			United States											China			Subtotals by decade	
Agency	Soviet space program Roscosmos			NASA			Private space corporations operating sub-orbital flights out of the United States				Private space corporations operating orbital flights out of the United States				CMSA			Subtotals by decade	
Decades	Program	Dates (Note: Dates in this table refer only to actual flights, and not the broader duration of their associated programs. For example, while Project Gemini was begun in 1961 and concluded in 1966, its crewed spaceflights occurred only from 1965–1966.)	No. (Note: Soyuz missions include the following: two fatal missions, Soyuz 1 and Soyuz 11, both of which reached space; Soyuz 18a, a non-fatal aborted mission which reached space as a sub-orbital flight; Soyuz 19, the Soviet participant in the Apollo–Soyuz; and Soyuz T-10a, a non-fatal accident in which the crewed launch was aborted due to a fire, failing to reach space.) (Note: Soyuz missions include Soyuz MS-10.)	Program (Note: Following the Apollo program, the Skylab and Apollo–Soyuz flights also used Apollo hardware.)	Dates	No. (Note: includes two fatal missions, STS-51-L, and STS-107. The former did not reach space, while the latter did. Includes X-15 flights over 80 km (50 miles).)	Company	Program	Dates	No. (Note: Includes VP-03 and VF-01, which both satisfied the United States definition of spaceflight (50 mi (80.47 km)), but fell short of the Kármán line (100 km (62.14 mi)), the Fédération Aéronautique Internationale definition.)	Company	Program	Dates	No.	Program	Dates	No.	Subtotals by decade	
1961–1970	Vostok	1961–1963	6	Mercury	1961–1963	6												52	
1961–1970	Voskhod	1964–1965	2	X-15	1962–1968	13												52	
1961–1970	Soyuz	1967–1991	66	Gemini	1965–1966	10												52	
1961–1970	Soyuz	1967–1991	66	Apollo	1968–1972	11												52	
1971–1980	Soyuz	1967–1991	66	Apollo	1968–1972	11												39	
1971–1980	Soyuz	1967–1991	66	Skylab	1973–1974	3												39	
1971–1980	Soyuz	1967–1991	66	Apollo–Soyuz	1975	1												39	
1981–1990	Soyuz	1967–1991	66	Space; Shuttle	1981–2011	135												63	
1991–2000	Soyuz	1992–present	91	Space; Shuttle	1981–2011	135												83	
2001–2010	Soyuz	1992–present	91	Space; Shuttle	1981–2011	135	Scaled Composites	SpaceShipOne	2004	3					Shenzhou	2003–present	18	61	
2011–2020	Soyuz	1992–present	91	Space; Shuttle	1981–2011	135	Virgin Galactic	SpaceShipTwo	2018–2024	11	SpaceX	Crew Dragon (Commercial Crew)	2020–present	21	Shenzhou	2003–present	18	47	
2021–2030	Soyuz	1992–present	91	Artemis	2026–present	1	Blue Origin	New Shepard	2021–present	17	Boeing	Boeing Starliner (Commercial Crew)	2024–present	1	Shenzhou	2003–present	18	71	
Subtotals by entity			165			180				31				22			18	Total	416

== Human spaceflights ==
The Salyut series, Skylab, Mir, ISS, and Tiangong series space stations, with which many of these flights docked in orbit, are not listed separately here. See the detailed lists (links below) for information.

- Missions which were intended to reach space but which failed to do so are listed in **bold.**
- Missions with a maximum altitude between 50 miles (80.4672 km) and 100 kilometers (62.137 mi), which satisfy the US Military definition of space (50 mi), but not the internationally recognized FAI and NASA definition of the Kármán Line (100 km), are listed in italics.
- Fatal missions are marked with a dagger (†) symbol.

=== 1961–1970 ===
Vostok 1 — Mercury-Redstone 3 — Mercury-Redstone 4 — Vostok 2
Mercury-Atlas 6 — Mercury-Atlas 7 — X-15 Flight 62 — Vostok 3 — Vostok 4 — Mercury-Atlas 8
X-15 Flight 77 — Mercury-Atlas 9 — Vostok 5 — Vostok 6 — X-15 Flight 87 — X-15 Flight 90 — X-15 Flight 91
Voskhod 1
Voskhod 2 — Gemini 3 — Gemini 4 — X-15 Flight 138 — X-15 Flight 143 — Gemini 5 — X-15 Flight 150 — X-15 Flight 153 — Gemini 7 — Gemini 6A
Gemini 8 — Gemini 9A — Gemini 10 — Gemini 11 — X-15 Flight 174 — Gemini 12
Soyuz 1† — X-15 Flight 190 — X-15 Flight 191†
X-15 Flight 197 — Apollo 7 — Soyuz 3 — Apollo 8
Soyuz 4 — Soyuz 5 — Apollo 9 — Apollo 10 — Apollo 11 — Soyuz 6 — Soyuz 7 — Soyuz 8 — Apollo 12
Apollo 13 — Soyuz 9

=== 1971–1980 ===
Apollo 14 — Soyuz 10 — Soyuz 11† — Apollo 15
Apollo 16 — Apollo 17
Skylab 2 — Skylab 3 — Soyuz 12 — Skylab 4 — Soyuz 13
Soyuz 14 — Soyuz 15 — Soyuz 16
Soyuz 17 — Soyuz 18a — Soyuz 18 — Soyuz 19 — Apollo-Soyuz
Soyuz 21 — Soyuz 22 — Soyuz 23
Soyuz 24 — Soyuz 25 — Soyuz 26
Soyuz 27 — Soyuz 28 — Soyuz 29 — Soyuz 30 — Soyuz 31
Soyuz 32 — Soyuz 33
Soyuz 35 — Soyuz 36 — Soyuz T-2 — Soyuz 37 — Soyuz 38 — Soyuz T-3

=== 1981–1990 ===
Soyuz T-4 — Soyuz 39 — STS-1 — Soyuz 40 — STS-2
STS-3 — Soyuz T-5 — Soyuz T-6 — STS-4 — Soyuz T-7 — STS-5
STS-6 — Soyuz T-8 — STS-7 — Soyuz T-9 — STS-8 — **Soyuz T-10a** — STS-9
STS-41-B — Soyuz T-10 — Soyuz T-11 — STS-41-C — Soyuz T-12 — STS-41-D — STS-41-G — STS-51-A
STS-51-C — STS-51-D — STS-51-B — Soyuz T-13 — STS-51-G — STS-51-F — STS-51-I — Soyuz T-14 — STS-51-J — STS-61-A — STS-61-B
STS-61-C — **STS-51-L**† — Soyuz T-15
Soyuz TM-2 — Soyuz TM-3 — Soyuz TM-4
Soyuz TM-5 — Soyuz TM-6 — STS-26 — Soyuz TM-7 — STS-27
STS-29 — STS-30 — STS-28 — Soyuz TM-8 — STS-34 — STS-33
STS-32 — Soyuz TM-9 — STS-36 — STS-31 — Soyuz TM-10 — STS-41 — STS-38 — STS-35 — Soyuz TM-11

=== 1991–2000 ===
STS-37 — STS-39 — Soyuz TM-12 — STS-40 — STS-43 — STS-48 — Soyuz TM-13 — STS-44
STS-42 — Soyuz TM-14 — STS-45 — STS-49 — STS-50 — Soyuz TM-15 — STS-46 — STS-47 — STS-52 — STS-53
STS-54 — Soyuz TM-16 — STS-56 — STS-55 — STS-57 — Soyuz TM-17 — STS-51 — STS-58 — STS-61
Soyuz TM-18 — STS-60 — STS-62 — STS-59 — Soyuz TM-19 — STS-65 — STS-64 — STS-68 — Soyuz TM-20 — STS-66
STS-63 — STS-67 — Soyuz TM-21 — STS-71 — STS-70 — Soyuz TM-22 — STS-69 — STS-73 — STS-74
STS-72 — Soyuz TM-23 — STS-75 — STS-76 — STS-77 — STS-78 — Soyuz TM-24 — STS-79 — STS-80
STS-81 — Soyuz TM-25 — STS-82 — STS-83 — STS-84 — STS-94 — Soyuz TM-26 — STS-85 — STS-86 — STS-87
STS-89 — Soyuz TM-27 — STS-90 — STS-91 — Soyuz TM-28 — STS-95 — STS-88
Soyuz TM-29 — STS-96 — STS-93 — STS-103
STS-99 — Soyuz TM-30 — STS-101 — STS-106 — STS-92 — Soyuz TM-31 — STS-97

=== 2001–2010 ===
STS-98 — STS-102 — STS-100 — Soyuz TM-32 — STS-104 — STS-105 — Soyuz TM-33 — STS-108
STS-109 — STS-110 — Soyuz TM-34 — STS-111 — STS-112 — Soyuz TMA-1 — STS-113
STS-107† — Soyuz TMA-2 — Shenzhou 5 — Soyuz TMA-3
Soyuz TMA-4 — SpaceShipOne Flight 15P — SpaceShipOne Flight 16P — SpaceShipOne Flight 17P — Soyuz TMA-5
Soyuz TMA-6 — STS-114 — Soyuz TMA-7 — Shenzhou 6
Soyuz TMA-8 — STS-121 — STS-115 — Soyuz TMA-9 — STS-116
Soyuz TMA-10 — STS-117 — STS-118 — Soyuz TMA-11 — STS-120
STS-122 — STS-123 — Soyuz TMA-12 — STS-124 — Shenzhou 7 — Soyuz TMA-13 — STS-126
STS-119 — Soyuz TMA-14 — STS-125 — Soyuz TMA-15 — STS-127 — STS-128 — Soyuz TMA-16 — STS-129 — Soyuz TMA-17
STS-130 — Soyuz TMA-18 — STS-131 — STS-132 — Soyuz TMA-19 — Soyuz TMA-01M — Soyuz TMA-20

=== 2011–2020 ===
STS-133 — Soyuz TMA-21 — STS-134 — Soyuz TMA-02M — STS-135 — Soyuz TMA-22 — Soyuz TMA-03M
Soyuz TMA-04M — Shenzhou 9 — Soyuz TMA-05M — Soyuz TMA-06M — Soyuz TMA-07M
Soyuz TMA-08M — Soyuz TMA-09M — Shenzhou 10 — Soyuz TMA-10M — Soyuz TMA-11M
Soyuz TMA-12M — Soyuz TMA-13M — Soyuz TMA-14M — Soyuz TMA-15M
Soyuz TMA-16M — Soyuz TMA-17M — Soyuz TMA-18M — Soyuz TMA-19M
Soyuz TMA-20M — Soyuz MS-01 — Shenzhou 11 — Soyuz MS-02 — Soyuz MS-03
Soyuz MS-04 — Soyuz MS-05 — Soyuz MS-06 — Soyuz MS-07
Soyuz MS-08 — Soyuz MS-09 — **Soyuz MS-10** — Soyuz MS-11 — VSS Unity VP-03
VSS Unity VF-01 — Soyuz MS-12 — Soyuz MS-13 — Soyuz MS-15
Soyuz MS-16 — Crew Dragon Demo-2 — Soyuz MS-17 — SpaceX Crew-1

=== 2021–present ===
Soyuz MS-18 — SpaceX Crew-2 — Virgin Galactic Unity-21 — Shenzhou-12 — Virgin Galactic Unity-22 — Blue Origin NS-16 — SpaceX Inspiration4 — Soyuz MS-19 — Blue Origin NS-18 — Shenzhou-13 — SpaceX Crew-3 — Soyuz MS-20 — Blue Origin NS-19
Soyuz MS-21 — Blue Origin NS-20 — Axiom Mission 1 — SpaceX Crew-4 — Blue Origin NS-21 — Shenzhou-14 — Blue Origin NS-22 — Soyuz MS-22 — SpaceX Crew-5 — Shenzhou-15
SpaceX Crew-6 — Axiom Mission 2 — Virgin Galactic Unity 25 — Shenzhou-16 — Galactic 01 — Galactic 02 — SpaceX Crew-7 — Galactic 03 — Soyuz MS-24 — Galactic 04 — Shenzhou-17 — Galactic 05
Axiom Mission 3 — Galactic 06 — SpaceX Crew-8 — Soyuz MS-25 — Shenzhou-18 — Blue Origin NS-25 — Boeing CFT — Galactic 07 — Blue Origin NS-26 — Polaris Dawn — Soyuz MS-26 — SpaceX Crew-9 — Shenzhou-19 — Blue Origin NS-28
Blue Origin NS-30 — SpaceX Crew-10 — Fram2 — Soyuz MS-27 — Blue Origin NS-31 — Shenzhou-20 — Blue Origin NS-32 — Axiom Mission 4 — Blue Origin NS-33 — SpaceX Crew-11 — Blue Origin NS-34 — Blue Origin NS-36 — Shenzhou-21 — Soyuz MS-28 — Blue Origin NS-37
Blue Origin NS-38 — SpaceX Crew-12 — Artemis II — Shenzhou-23 — Soyuz MS-29 — SpaceX Crew-13

== Timeline ==
=== List by decades ===
Decade	Total flights	Major milestones	First by nationality
1960s	41	(Soviet Union) Yuri Gagarin, first human in space. (Soviet Union) Valentina Tereshkova, first woman in space. (Soviet Union) Alexei Leonov, first EVA. (United States) Neil Armstrong, first human on the Moon.	(Soviet Union) Yuri Gagarin (United States) Alan Shepard
1970s	38	(United States) Alfred Worden, first deep space EVA.	(Czechoslovakia) Vladimír Remek (Poland) Mirosław Hermaszewski (East Germany) Sigmund Jähn (Bulgaria) Georgi Ivanov (Hungary) Bertalan Farkas (Vietnam) Phạm Tuân (Cuba) Arnaldo Tamayo Méndez
1980s	61	(United States) Bruce McCandless II, first untethered spacewalk.	(Mongolia) Jügderdemidiin Gürragchaa (Romania) Dumitru Prunariu (France) Jean-Loup Chrétien (Germany) Ulf Merbold (India) Rakesh Sharma (Canada) Marc Garneau (Saudi Arabia) Sultan Salman Al Saud (Netherlands) Wubbo J. Ockels (Syria) Mohammed Faris (Afghanistan) Abdul Ahad Mohmand (Mexico) Rodolfo Neri Vela (Japan) Toyohiro Akiyama
1990s	83	(Russia) Yuri Gidzenko, (Russia) Sergei Krikalev and (United States) William M. Shepherd, first crew on ISS.	(United Kingdom) Helen Sharman (Austria) Franz Viehböck (Belgium) Dirk Frimout (Russia) Aleksandr Viktorenko and Aleksandr Kaleri (Switzerland) Claude Nicollier (Italy) Franco Malerba (Ukraine) Leonid Kadeniuk (Spain) Pedro Duque (Slovakia) Ivan Bella
2000s	61	(United States) Dennis Tito, first paying space tourist. SpaceShipOne flight 16P, first private suborbital flight	(South Africa) Mark Shuttleworth (Israel) Ilan Ramon (China) Yang Liwei (Sweden) Christer Fuglesang (Malaysia) Sheikh Muszaphar Shukor (South Korea) Yi So-yeon
2010s	44	—	(Denmark) Andreas Mogensen (Kazakhstan) Aidyn Aimbetov (United Arab Emirates) Hazza Al Mansouri
2020-present	51	Inspiration4, first fully private orbital flight Axiom Mission 1, first fully private ISS orbital flight Polaris Dawn, first fully private orbital spacewalk Fram2, first polar retrograde orbital flight (Germany) Michaela Benthaus, First wheelchair user in space (United States) Victor Glover, First person of colour beyond Low Earth Orbit (United States) Christina Koch, First woman beyond Low Earth Orbit (Canada) Jeremy Hansen, First non-American beyond Low Earth Orbit	(Portugal) Mário Ferreira (Egypt) Sara Sabry (Antigua and Barbuda) Keisha Schahaff and Anastatia Mayers (Pakistan) Namira Salim (Turkey) Alper Gezeravcı (Belarus) Marina Vasilevskaya (Malta) / (Saint Kitts and Nevis) (Note: Wang was born in China but lives primarily in Svalbard and since 2023 is also a citizen of Malta and Saint Kitts and Nevis through their golden visa programs. He will wear the flag of Malta on his spacesuit during the spaceflight.) Chun Wang (Australia) Chris Boshuizen (Norway) / (United Kingdom) (Note: Mikkelsen was born in the United Kingdom, but is now a citizen of Norway. She will wear the flag of Norway on her spacesuit during the spaceflight.) Jannicke Mikkelsen (The Bahamas) Aisha Bowe (Panama) Jaime Alemán (New Zealand) Mark Rocket (Nigeria) Owolabi Salis

== See also ==
- List of human spaceflight programs
- Human presence in space
- List of Asian astronauts
