= List of X-15 flights =

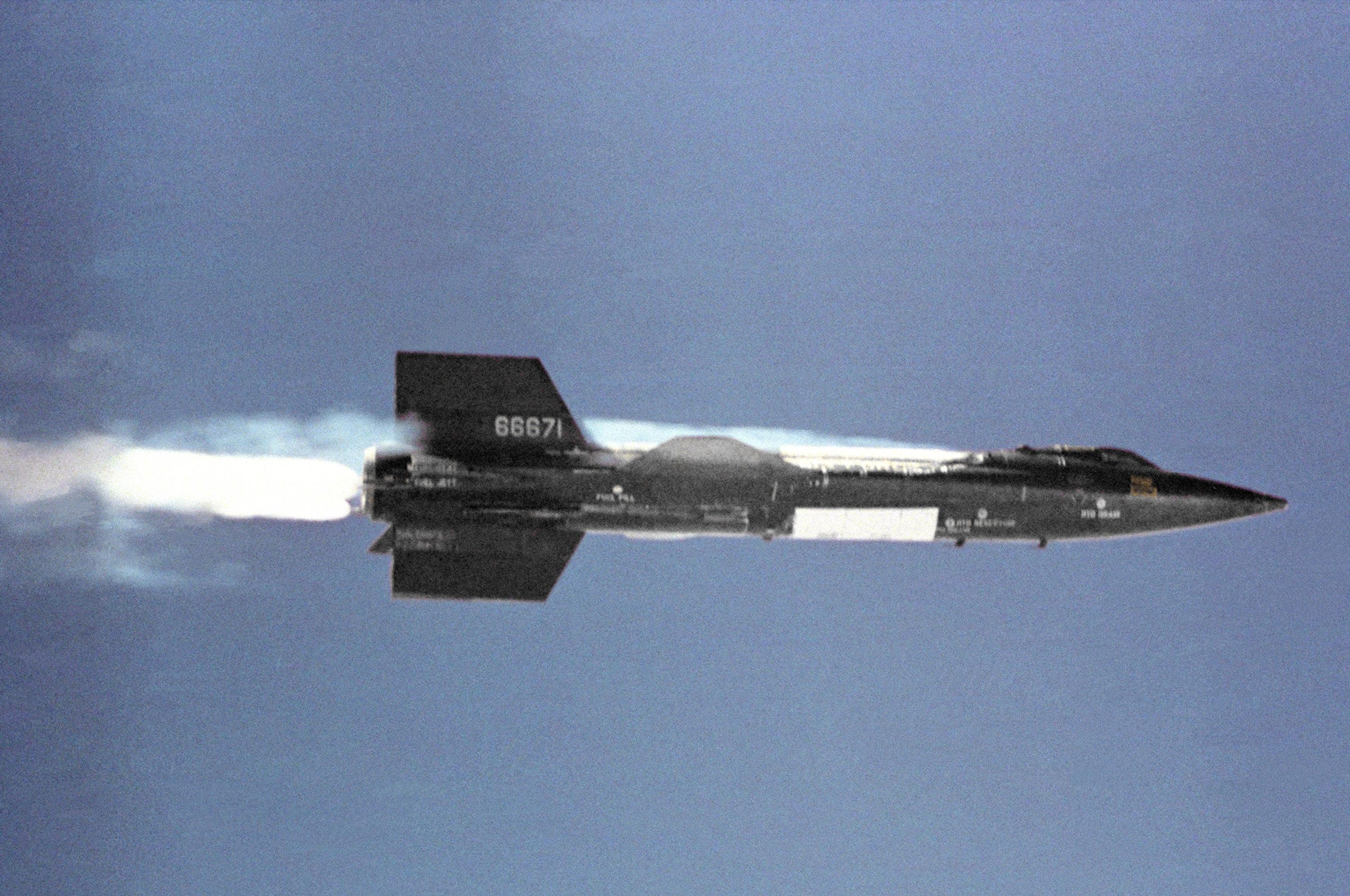
Three X-15 spaceplanes performed 199 free flights.

The flights of the North American X-15, an experimental American spaceplane built by North American Aviation and operated by the United States Air Force and NASA, were conducted from 1959 to 1968. Twelve pilots flew three X-15 spaceplanes, flying record high-altitude flights, high-speed flights, and sub-orbital spaceflights. Collectively, pilots and craft performed a total of 199 free flights after being carried aloft and then air launched from one of two modified B-52 mother ships. The pilots and craft also performed twelve scheduled captive carry test flights and 125 aborted flights (frequently due either to technical problems or poor weather) in which the X-15 did not uncouple from its B-52 mother ship, for a grand total of 336 flights. (Note: All data presented in this article's primary table are taken directly from Evans, including information about the captive and aborted flights. Evans does not provide carrier, Mach, velocity or altitude data for the captive and aborted flights, and these fields are therefore left blank. Jenkins (2000, Appendix 9) provides a subset of the data given by Evans, for the free flights only. In almost all cases, the two data sets match exactly. However, there are some minor discrepancies. For free flights 18, 73, 127, 128, 130, 131, 160, 190 and 191, Jenkins reports maximum velocities of 2,195, 3,716, 3,539, 3,702, 3,657, 3,260, 3,661, 3,869 and 3,617 miles per hour, respectively. Jenkins also reports maximum altitudes of 100,200 and 92,000 feet, and a maximum Mach of 4.17 for free flights 170, 176 and 184, respectively.) The X-15 program's flights generated data and flight experience which supported future development of aircraft, spacecraft, and human spaceflight.

Five principal aircraft were used during the X-15 program: three X-15 spaceplanes and two modified "nonstandard" NB-52 bomber carriers:

- X-15-1 – 56-6670,
- X-15-2 (later modified to become the X-15 A2) – 56-6671,
- X-15-3 – 56-6672,
- NB-52A – 52-003 nicknamed The High and Mighty One,
- NB-52B – 52-008 nicknamed The Challenger, later Balls 8.

Additionally, F-100, F-104 and F5D chase aircraft and C-130 and C-47 transports supported the program.

== Pilots ==
Twelve pilots flew the X-15 over the course of its career. Scott Crossfield and William Dana flew the X-15 on its first and last free flights, respectively. Joseph Walker set the program's top two altitude records on its 90th and 91st free flights (347,800 and 354,200 feet, respectively), becoming the only pilot to fly past the Kármán line, the 100 kilometer, FAI-recognized boundary of outer space, during the program. William Knight set the program's Mach (6.70) and speed (4,520 mph) records on its 188th free flight. Neil Armstrong was the first pilot to fly the program's third plane, the X-15-3. Following his participation in the program, Joe Engle commanded a future spaceplane, the Space Shuttle, on two missions. Robert Rushworth flew 34 free flights, the most in the program. Forrest Petersen flew five, the fewest. Robert White was the first person to fly the X-15 above 100,000 feet. Milton Thompson piloted a series of typical flights during the middle of the program. John McKay was injured in (and recovered from, returning to active flight status) a landing accident which damaged the X-15-2, leading to its refurbishment as the modified X-15A-2. Michael Adams was killed in the program's 191st free flight. Five pilots were Air Force personnel, five were NASA personnel, one (Crossfield) was employed by manufacturer North American, and one (Petersen) was a Navy pilot.

Over thirteen flights, eight pilots flew above 264,000 feet or 50 miles, thereby qualifying as astronauts according to the United States definition of the space border. All five Air Force pilots flew above 50 miles and were awarded military astronaut wings contemporaneously with their achievements, including Adams, who received the distinction posthumously following the flight 191 disaster. However the other three were NASA employees, and did not receive a comparable decoration at the time. In 2004, the Federal Aviation Administration conferred its first-ever commercial astronaut wings on Mike Melvill and Brian Binnie, pilots of the commercial SpaceShipOne, another spaceplane with a flight profile comparable to the X-15's. Following this in 2005, NASA retroactively awarded its civilian astronaut wings to Dana (then living), and to McKay and Walker (posthumously). Eleven flights above 50 miles were made in the X-15-3, and two were made in the X-15-1.

Every X-15 pilot also flew as a program chase pilot at least once, supporting missions in which they were not flying as lead pilots. Other chase pilots included future astronauts Michael Collins, Fred Haise and Jim McDivitt.

The two NB-52 mother ships were most frequently piloted by Fitz Fulton. On one occasion Chuck Yeager, former pilot of the X-15's predecessor X-plane the X-1, the first crewed craft to break the sound barrier, assisted as NB-52 co-pilot for an aborted flight.

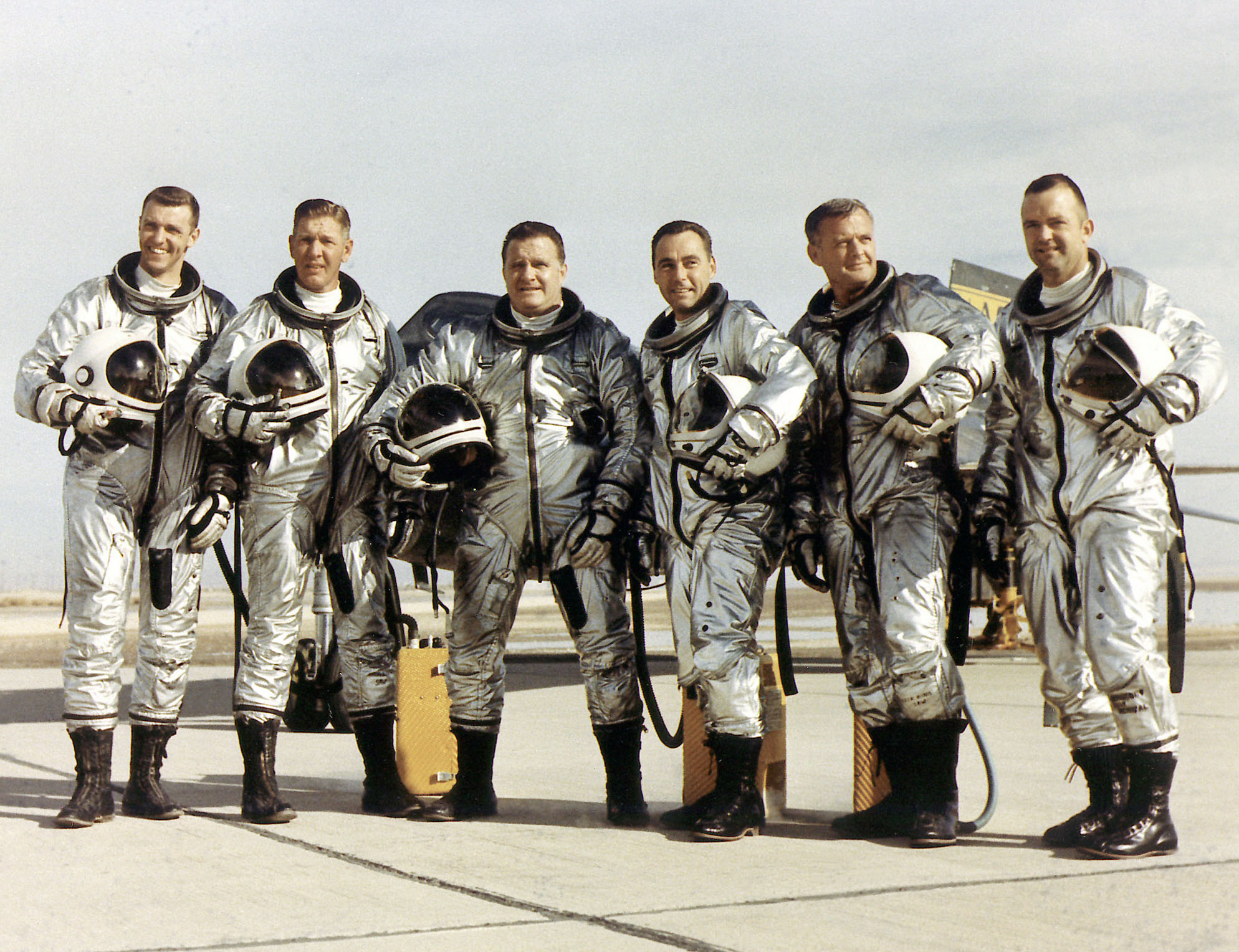
X-15 pilots as of December 1965, left to right: Joe Engle, Bob Rushworth, John McKay, Pete Knight, Milt Thompson, and Bill Dana.

The twelve X-15 pilots and their flights (Note: This summary table combines all captive and aborted flights into single entries, and makes no distinction between the X-15-2 and the X-15A-2.)
X-15 pilots		Pilot flights by individual plane						Flight totals by pilot		
X-15 pilots		X-15-1		X-15-2		X-15-3		Flight totals by pilot		
Pilot	Agency	FF	CAF	FF	CAF	FF	CAF	PTFF	PTCAF	PGTF
Michael; Adams	USAF	4	8	—	—	3	2	7	10	17
Neil; Armstrong	NASA	3	—	—	—	4	4	7	4	11
Scott; Crossfield	NAA	2	5	12	11	—	—	14	16	30
William; Dana	NASA	6	7	—	—	10	6	16	13	29
Joe; Engle	USAF	7	3	—	—	9	3	16	6	22
William; Knight	USAF	6	2	8	8	2	—	16	10	26
John; McKay	NASA	12	10	11	8	6	2	29	20	49
Forrest; Petersen	USN	4	2	1	—	—	—	5	2	7
Robert; Rushworth	USAF	13	5	12	8	9	4	34	17	51
Milton; Thompson	NASA	5	7	—	—	9	2	14	9	23
Joseph; Walker	NASA	13	7	3	2	9	5	25	14	39
Robert; White	USAF	6	5	6	7	4	4	16	16	32
Flight totals by plane		81	61	53	44	65	32	199	137	336

== Flight numbering ==
Two conventions have been used to number the X-15's flights. In one, the numbers 1 through 199 were used to chronologically denote the free flights made by any of the three spaceplanes. For example, flight 1 (8 June 1959) was made by the X-15-1, flight 34 (7 March 1961) was made by the X-15-2, and flight 49 (5 April 1962) was made by the X-15-3. This convention ignores captive and aborted flights.

The other convention was an official three-part flight designation number, described in a 1960 letter by NASA flight research director Paul Bikle, (Note: See Jenkins for this letter. Also note that the letter gives a partial listing of the first several program flights, including aborts and captive carries, which agree with Evans and this article's table.) and split into three columns below. The first part, a number—1, 2 or 3—would denote the involved X-15 plane. The second part—a number, or "A", or "C"—would denote that individual X-15's chronological free flights; aborted flights were coded as "A", and scheduled captive carry test flights were coded as "C". The third part, a number, would denote the total number of times to-date that the individual X-15 had been taken aloft by a carrier, whether resulting in a free flight or not. For example, the X-15-1 was first taken aloft on scheduled captive test flight 1-C-1, next performed three aborted missions (1-A-2, 1-A-3, and 1-A-4), and then performed its first successful free flight on its fifth time taken aloft (1-1-5). (Note: Further, the grand totals of program flights are encoded in the designations of each X-15's final flight. The X-15A-2 was retired and never taken aloft again after setting the program's speed records on free flight 2-53-97 (or flight 188). Shortly thereafter, the X-15-3 was destroyed on its final free flight, 3-65-97 (or flight 191), killing pilot Michael Adams. The X-15-1 remained in service until 1968, performing final free flight 1-81-141 (or flight 199). However, the X-15-1 was taken aloft one last time on aborted flight 1-A-142, in one of several failed efforts to make a 200th and final free flight in the program. The sum of the final free flight numbers' second parts, 53, 65 and 81, return the 199 overall free flights of the program. The sum of the three final flights' third parts, 97, 97 and 142, return the grand total 336 flights of the program. Subtracting the former from the latter gives 137, the total aborted and captive flights.)

On 9 November 1962, flight 74 (2-31-52), the X-15-2 suffered a landing accident which damaged the craft and also injured its pilot, John McKay, who suffered crushed vertebrae and later returned to active flight status. This presented North American with an opportunity not only to repair the plane, but to modify it—an idea which the Air Force and NASA were uninterested in while all three spaceplanes were in operational service, but agreed to once repairs were made necessary. The result was a new, distinct airframe known as the X-15A-2 which returned to flight in June 1964, first on a scheduled captive check-out flight (15 June, 2-C-53) and an abort (23 June, 2-A-54) before finally making its return free flight on 25 June (flight 109, 2-32-55), all piloted by Robert Rushworth. The flight numbering conventions made no distinction between the original craft and its modified iteration; it continued to be designated "2".

Neither convention accounted for which of the two NB-52 carriers took an X-15 aloft, given in a separate column below. On free flights, the NB-52A carried the X-15 aloft 93 times, while the NB-52B carried it aloft 106 times.

== List of flights ==
Flights of the North American X-15
		3 Pt. FID									
GTF	FF	Pl	FF(I)	TF(I)	Carr	Date	Pilot	MM	MV	MA	Notes (Note: This column sorts notable flights in a hierarchical ordering of attributes. First, the two flights above 100 km, denoted "FAI spaceflight", are listed (by altitude). Second, the eleven flights between 50 mi and 100 km, denoted "U.S. spaceflight" are listed (chronologically). Third, the flight setting the program's Mach and speed records is listed. Fourth, each plane's first and last times aloft or in flight are listed (sequentially, then chronologically). Fifth, each pilot's first and last times aloft or in flight are listed (alphabetically, then chronologically). Finally, general comments are made in some cases. If a flight has more than one attribute, it is sorted with its attribute of highest precedence, as in the above ordering.)
1	—	1	C	1	—	10 March 1959	Crossfield	—	—	—	The X-15-1's first time aloft. Crossfield's first time aloft. First time aloft of program.
2	—	1	A	2	—	1 April 1959	Crossfield	—	—	—	
3	—	1	A	3	—	10 April 1959	Crossfield	—	—	—	
4	—	1	A	4	—	21 May 1959	Crossfield	—	—	—	
5	1	1	1	5	3	8 June 1959	Crossfield	0.79	522	37,550	The X-15-1's first free flight. Crossfield's first free flight. Glide flight, only one scheduled during program.
6	—	2	C	1	—	24 July 1959	Crossfield	—	—	—	The X-15-2's first time aloft.
7	—	2	A	2	—	4 September 1959	Crossfield	—	—	—	
8	2	2	1	3	3	17 September 1959	Crossfield	2.11	1,393	52,341	The X-15-2's first free flight. First powered flight of program.
9	—	2	A	4	—	10 October 1959	Crossfield	—	—	—	
10	—	2	A	5	—	14 October 1959	Crossfield	—	—	—	
11	3	2	2	6	3	17 October 1959	Crossfield	2.15	1,419	61,781	
12	—	2	A	7	—	22 October 1959	Crossfield	—	—	—	
13	—	2	A	8	—	31 October 1959	Crossfield	—	—	—	
14	4	2	3	9	3	5 November 1959	Crossfield	1.00	660	45,462	XLR-11 engine explodes after ignition and the fuselage breaks during landing.
15	—	1	A	6	—	16 December 1959	Crossfield	—	—	—	
16	5	1	2	7	8	23 January 1960	Crossfield	2.53	1,669	66,844	
17	—	2	A	10	—	4 February 1960	Crossfield	—	—	—	
18	6	2	4	11	8	11 February 1960	Crossfield	2.22	1,466	88,116	
19	7	2	5	12	8	17 February 1960	Crossfield	1.57	1,036	52,640	
20	8	2	6	13	8	17 March 1960	Crossfield	2.15	1,419	52,640	
21	—	2	A	14	—	18 March 1960	Crossfield	—	—	—	
22	9	1	3	8	8	25 March 1960	Walker	2.00	1,320	48,630	Walker's first free flight.
23	10	2	7	15	8	29 March 1960	Crossfield	1.96	1,293	49,982	
24	11	2	8	16	8	31 March 1960	Crossfield	2.03	1,340	51,356	
25	12	1	4	9	3	13 April 1960	White	1.90	1,254	48,000	White's first free flight.
26	13	1	5	10	3	19 April 1960	Walker	2.56	1,689	59,496	
27	—	2	A	17	—	5 May 1960	Crossfield	—	—	—	
28	14	1	6	11	3	6 May 1960	White	2.20	1,452	60,938	
29	15	1	7	12	3	12 May 1960	Walker	3.19	2,111	77,882	
30	16	1	8	13	3	19 May 1960	White	2.31	1,590	108,997	
31	17	2	9	18	8	26 May 1960	Crossfield	2.20	1,452	51,282	
32	—	1	A	14	—	27 May 1960	Walker	—	—	—	
33	—	1	A	15	—	3 June 1960	Walker	—	—	—	
34	—	1	A	16	—	8 June 1960	Walker	—	—	—	
35	18	1	9	17	3	4 August 1960	Walker	3.31	2,196	78,112	
36	—	1	A	18	—	11 August 1960	White	—	—	—	
37	19	1	10	19	3	12 August 1960	White	2.52	1,772	136,500	
38	—	1	A	20	—	18 August 1960	Walker	—	—	—	
39	20	1	11	21	3	19 August 1960	Walker	3.13	1,986	75,982	
40	—	1	A	22	—	2 September 1960	White	—	—	—	
41	21	1	12	23	8	10 September 1960	White	3.23	2,182	79,864	
42	—	1	A	24	—	20 September 1960	Petersen	—	—	—	Petersen's first time aloft.
43	22	1	13	25	8	23 September 1960	Petersen	1.68	1,108	53,043	Petersen's first free flight.
44	—	1	A	26	—	11 October 1960	Petersen	—	—	—	
45	—	2	A	19	—	13 October 1960	Crossfield	—	—	—	
46	23	1	14	27	8	20 October 1960	Petersen	1.94	1,280	53,800	
47	24	1	15	28	8	28 October 1960	McKay	2.02	1,333	50,700	McKay's first free flight.
48	—	2	A	20	—	4 November 1960	Crossfield	—	—	—	
49	25	1	16	29	8	4 November 1960	Rushworth	1.95	1,287	48,900	Rushworth's first free flight.
50	26	2	10	21	3	15 November 1960	Crossfield	2.97	1,960	81,200	The X-15-2's first flight with the XLR-99 engine.
51	27	1	17	30	3	17 November 1960	Rushworth	1.90	1,254	54,750	
52	28	2	11	22	3	22 November 1960	Crossfield	2.51	1,656	61,900	
53	29	1	18	31	8	30 November 1960	Armstrong	1.75	1,155	48,840	Armstrong's first free flight.
54	30	2	12	23	3	6 December 1960	Crossfield	2.85	1,881	53,374	Crossfield's last free flight.
55	31	1	19	32	8	9 December 1960	Armstrong	1.80	1,188	50,095	
56	—	1	A	33	—	15 December 1960	McKay	—	—	—	
57	—	1	A	34	—	11 January 1961	McKay	—	—	—	
58	32	1	20	35	8	1 February 1961	McKay	1.88	1,211	49,780	
59	33	1	21	36	8	7 February 1961	White	3.50	2,275	78,150	
60	—	2	A	24	—	21 February 1961	White	—	—	—	
61	—	2	A	25	—	24 February 1961	White	—	—	—	
62	34	2	13	26	8	7 March 1961	White	4.43	2,905	77,450	
63	—	2	A	27	—	21 March 1961	Walker	—	—	—	
64	35	2	14	28	8	30 March 1961	Walker	3.95	2,760	169,600	
65	36	2	15	29	3	21 April 1961	White	4.62	3,074	105,000	
66	—	2	A	30	—	19 May 1961	Walker	—	—	—	
67	37	2	16	31	3	25 May 1961	Walker	4.95	3,307	107,500	
68	—	2	A	32	—	20 June 1961	White	—	—	—	
69	38	2	17	33	3	23 June 1961	White	5.27	3,603	107,700	
70	39	1	22	37	3	10 August 1961	Petersen	4.11	2,735	78,200	The X-15-1's first flight with the XLR-99 engine.
71	40	2	18	34	8	12 September 1961	Walker	5.21	3,618	114,300	
72	41	2	19	35	8	28 September 1961	Petersen	5.30	3,600	101,800	
73	—	1	A	38	—	29 September 1961	Rushworth	—	—	—	
74	42	1	23	39	3	4 October 1961	Rushworth	4.30	2,830	78,000	
75	43	2	20	36	3	11 October 1961	White	5.21	3,647	217,000	
76	44	1	24	40	3	17 October 1961	Walker	5.74	3,900	108,600	
77	—	1	A	41	—	27 October 1961	White	—	—	—	
78	—	1	A	42	—	2 November 1961	White	—	—	—	
79	—	1	A	43	—	3 November 1961	White	—	—	—	
80	45	2	21	37	8	9 November 1961	White	6.04	4,093	101,600	
81	—	3	A	1	—	19 December 1961	Armstrong	—	—	—	The X-15-3's first time aloft.
82	46	3	1	2	3	20 December 1961	Armstrong	3.76	2,502	81,000	The X-15-3's first free flight.
83	47	1	25	44	3	10 January 1962	Petersen	0.97	645	44,750	Petersen's last free flight.
84	48	3	2	3	3	17 January 1962	Armstrong	5.51	3,765	133,500	
85	—	3	A	4	—	29 March 1962	Armstrong	—	—	—	
86	—	3	A	5	—	30 March 1962	Armstrong	—	—	—	
87	—	3	A	6	—	31 March 1962	Armstrong	—	—	—	
88	49	3	3	7	3	5 April 1962	Armstrong	4.12	2,850	180,000	
89	—	1	A	45	—	18 April 1962	Walker	—	—	—	
90	50	1	26	46	3	19 April 1962	Walker	5.69	3,866	154,000	
91	51	3	4	8	8	20 April 1962	Armstrong	5.31	3,789	207,500	
92	—	2	A	38	—	25 April 1962	White	—	—	—	
93	—	2	A	39	—	26 April 1962	White	—	—	—	
94	—	1	A	47	—	27 April 1962	Walker	—	—	—	
95	52	1	27	48	8	30 April 1962	Walker	4.94	3,489	246,700	
96	53	2	22	40	8	8 May 1962	Rushworth	5.34	3,524	70,400	
97	54	1	28	49	3	22 May 1962	Rushworth	5.03	3,450	100,400	
98	—	2	A	41	—	25 May 1962	White	—	—	—	
99	—	2	A	42	—	29 May 1962	White	—	—	—	
100	55	2	23	43	8	1 June 1962	White	5.42	3,675	132,600	
101	56	1	29	50	3	7 June 1962	Walker	5.39	3,672	103,600	
102	57	3	5	9	8	12 June 1962	White	5.02	3,517	184,600	
103	58	3	6	10	8	21 June 1962	White	5.08	3,641	246,700	
104	59	1	30	51	3	27 June 1962	Walker	5.92	4,104	123,700	
105	60	2	24	44	8	29 June 1962	McKay	4.95	3,280	83,200	
106	—	3	A	11	—	10 July 1962	White	—	—	—	
107	—	3	A	12	—	11 July 1962	White	—	—	—	
108	—	3	A	13	—	16 July 1962	White	—	—	—	
109	61	1	31	52	8	16 July 1962	Walker	5.37	3,674	107,200	
110	62	3	7	14	3	17 July 1962	White	5.45	3,832	314,750	U.S. spaceflight.
111	63	2	25	45	8	19 July 1962	McKay	5.18	3,474	85,250	
112	64	1	32	53	3	26 July 1962	Armstrong	5.74	3,989	98,900	Armstrong's last free flight.
113	—	3	A	15	—	1 August 1962	Walker	—	—	—	
114	65	3	8	16	3	2 August 1962	Walker	5.07	3,438	144,500	
115	66	2	26	46	8	8 August 1962	Rushworth	4.40	2,943	90,877	
116	—	3	A	17	—	10 August 1962	Walker	—	—	—	
117	67	3	9	18	3	14 August 1962	Walker	5.25	3,747	193,600	
118	68	2	27	47	8	20 August 1962	Rushworth	5.24	3,534	88,900	
119	69	2	28	48	8	29 August 1962	Rushworth	5.12	3,447	97,200	
120	—	2	A	49	—	27 September 1962	McKay	—	—	—	
121	70	2	29	50	8	28 September 1962	McKay	4.22	2,765	68,200	
122	71	3	10	19	8	4 October 1962	Rushworth	5.17	3,493	112,200	
123	72	2	30	51	3	9 October 1962	McKay	5.46	3,716	130,200	
124	73	3	11	20	8	23 October 1962	Rushworth	5.47	3,764	134,500	
125	74	2	31	52	8	9 November 1962	McKay	1.49	1,019	53,950	The X-15-2's last free flight. Landing accident damaged craft and injured pilot, leading to modification.
126	—	3	A	21	—	13 December 1962	White	—	—	—	
127	75	3	12	22	8	14 December 1962	White	5.65	3,742	141,400	White's last free flight.
128	76	3	13	23	8	20 December 1962	Walker	5.73	3,793	160,400	
129	77	3	14	24	8	17 January 1963	Walker	5.47	3,677	271,700	U.S. spaceflight.
130	78	1	33	54	8	11 April 1963	Rushworth	4.25	2,864	74,400	
131	79	3	15	25	8	18 April 1963	Walker	5.51	3,770	92,500	
132	80	1	34	55	8	25 April 1963	McKay	5.32	3,654	105,500	
133	81	3	16	26	8	2 May 1963	Walker	4.73	3,488	209,400	
134	—	3	A	27	—	10 May 1963	Rushworth	—	—	—	
135	82	3	17	28	8	14 May 1963	Rushworth	5.20	3,600	95,600	
136	83	1	35	56	3	15 May 1963	McKay	5.57	3,856	124,200	
137	84	3	18	29	8	29 May 1963	Walker	5.52	3,858	92,000	
138	85	3	19	30	8	18 June 1963	Rushworth	4.97	3,539	223,700	
139	86	1	36	57	3	25 June 1963	Walker	5.51	3,911	111,800	
140	87	3	20	31	8	27 June 1963	Rushworth	4.89	3,425	285,000	U.S. spaceflight.
141	—	1	A	58	—	3 July 1963	Walker	—	—	—	
142	88	1	37	59	8	9 July 1963	Walker	5.07	3,631	226,400	
143	—	1	A	60	—	17 July 1963	Rushworth	—	—	—	
144	89	1	38	61	3	18 July 1963	Rushworth	5.63	3,925	104,800	
145	90	3	21	32	8	19 July 1963	Walker	5.50	3,710	347,800	FAI spaceflight. Second highest altitude of program.
146	—	3	A	33	—	6 August 1963	Walker	—	—	—	
147	—	3	A	34	—	13 August 1963	Walker	—	—	—	
148	—	3	A	35	—	15 August 1963	Walker	—	—	—	
149	91	3	22	36	3	22 August 1963	Walker	5.58	3,794	354,200	FAI spaceflight. Walker's last free flight. Highest altitude of program.
150	—	1	A	62	—	4 October 1963	Engle	—	—	—	Engle's first time aloft.
151	92	1	39	63	8	7 October 1963	Engle	4.21	2,834	77,800	Engle's first free flight.
152	—	3	A	37	—	14 October 1963	Rushworth	—	—	—	
153	—	3	A	38	—	25 October 1963	Rushworth	—	—	—	
154	93	1	40	64	8	29 October 1963	Thompson	4.10	2,712	74,400	Thompson's first free flight.
155	94	3	23	39	8	7 November 1963	Rushworth	4.40	2,925	82,300	
156	95	1	41	65	8	14 November 1963	Engle	4.75	3,286	90,800	
157	—	3	A	40	—	19 November 1963	Thompson	—	—	—	
158	96	3	24	41	8	27 November 1963	Thompson	4.94	3,310	89,800	
159	—	1	A	66	—	3 December 1963	Rushworth	—	—	—	
160	97	1	42	67	8	5 December 1963	Rushworth	6.06	4,018	101,000	
161	—	1	A	68	—	18 December 1963	Rushworth	—	—	—	
162	98	1	43	69	8	8 January 1964	Engle	5.32	3,616	139,900	
163	99	3	25	42	8	16 January 1964	Thompson	4.92	3,242	71,000	
164	100	1	44	70	8	28 January 1964	Rushworth	5.34	3,618	107,400	
165	101	3	26	43	3	19 February 1964	Thompson	5.29	3,519	78,600	
166	102	3	27	44	3	13 March 1964	McKay	5.11	3,392	76,000	
167	—	1	A	71	—	17 March 1964	Rushworth	—	—	—	
168	103	1	45	72	3	27 March 1964	Rushworth	5.63	3,827	101,500	
169	—	3	A	45	—	31 March 1964	McKay	—	—	—	
170	104	1	46	73	3	8 April 1964	Engle	5.01	3,468	175,000	
171	105	1	47	74	3	29 April 1964	Rushworth	5.72	3,906	101,600	
172	—	3	A	46	—	11 May 1964	McKay	—	—	—	
173	106	3	28	47	3	12 May 1964	McKay	4.66	3,084	72,800	
174	107	1	48	75	3	19 May 1964	Engle	5.02	3,494	195,800	
175	108	3	29	48	3	21 May 1964	Thompson	2.90	1,865	64,200	
176	—	1	A	76	—	11 June 1964	Thompson	—	—	—	
177	—	2	C	53	—	15 June 1964	Rushworth	—	—	—	The X-15A-2's first time aloft. Return to service of modified craft.
178	—	2	A	54	—	23 June 1964	Rushworth	—	—	—	
179	109	2	32	55	3	25 June 1964	Rushworth	4.59	3,104	83,300	The X-15A-2's first free flight. Return flight of modified craft.
180	110	1	49	77	3	30 June 1964	McKay	4.96	3,334	99,600	
181	—	3	A	49	—	2 July 1964	Engle	—	—	—	
182	111	3	30	50	3	8 July 1964	Engle	5.05	3,520	170,400	
183	—	3	A	51	—	28 July 1964	Engle	—	—	—	
184	112	3	31	52	3	29 July 1964	Engle	5.38	3,623	78,000	
185	113	3	32	53	3	12 August 1964	Thompson	5.24	3,535	81,200	
186	114	2	33	56	3	14 August 1964	Rushworth	5.23	3,590	103,300	
187	115	3	33	54	3	26 August 1964	McKay	5.65	3,863	91,000	
188	116	3	34	55	3	3 September 1964	Thompson	5.35	3,615	78,600	
189	—	3	A	56	—	23 September 1964	Engle	—	—	—	
190	117	3	35	57	3	28 September 1964	Engle	5.59	3,888	97,000	
191	118	2	34	57	8	29 September 1964	Rushworth	5.20	3,542	97,800	
192	—	1	A	78	—	2 October 1964	McKay	—	—	—	
193	119	1	50	79	8	15 October 1964	McKay	4.56	3,048	84,900	
194	—	3	C	58	—	29 October 1964	Thompson	—	—	—	
195	120	3	36	59	8	30 October 1964	Thompson	4.66	3,113	84,600	
196	—	2	C	58	—	6 November 1964	McKay	—	—	—	
197	—	2	C	59	—	16 November 1964	McKay	—	—	—	
198	121	2	35	60	8	30 November 1964	McKay	4.66	3,089	87,200	
199	—	1	A	80	—	4 December 1964	Engle	—	—	—	
200	122	3	37	60	8	9 December 1964	Thompson	5.42	3,723	92,400	
201	123	1	51	81	3	10 December 1964	Engle	5.35	3,675	113,200	
202	124	3	38	61	3	22 December 1964	Rushworth	5.55	3,593	81,200	
203	125	3	39	62	3	13 January 1965	Thompson	5.48	3,712	99,400	
204	—	1	A	82	—	26 January 1965	McKay	—	—	—	
205	126	3	40	63	8	2 February 1965	Engle	5.71	3,885	98,200	
206	—	2	C	61	—	15 February 1965	Rushworth	—	—	—	
207	—	2	C	62	—	15 February 1965	Rushworth	—	—	—	
208	127	2	36	63	8	17 February 1965	Rushworth	5.27	3,511	95,100	
209	—	1	A	83	—	19 February 1965	McKay	—	—	—	
210	—	1	A	84	—	25 February 1965	McKay	—	—	—	
211	128	1	52	85	8	26 February 1965	McKay	5.40	3,750	153,600	
212	129	1	53	86	8	26 March 1965	Rushworth	5.17	3,580	101,900	
213	130	3	41	64	8	23 April 1965	Engle	5.48	3,580	79,700	
214	131	2	37	64	8	28 April 1965	McKay	4.80	3,273	92,600	
215	—	1	A	87	—	11 May 1965	Thompson	—	—	—	
216	—	2	A	65	—	13 May 1965	McKay	—	—	—	
217	132	2	38	66	8	18 May 1965	McKay	5.17	3,541	102,100	
218	133	1	54	88	8	25 May 1965	Thompson	4.87	3,418	179,800	
219	134	3	42	65	8	28 May 1965	Engle	5.17	3,754	209,600	
220	—	2	A	67	—	4 June 1965	McKay	—	—	—	
221	—	2	A	68	—	8 June 1965	McKay	—	—	—	
222	—	2	A	69	—	11 June 1965	McKay	—	—	—	
223	135	3	43	66	3	16 June 1965	Engle	4.69	3,404	244,700	
224	136	1	55	89	8	17 June 1965	Thompson	5.14	3,541	108,500	
225	137	2	39	70	8	22 June 1965	McKay	5.64	3,938	155,900	
226	138	3	44	67	8	29 June 1965	Engle	4.94	3,432	280,600	U.S. spaceflight.
227	—	2	A	71	—	2 July 1965	McKay	—	—	—	
228	139	2	40	72	3	8 July 1965	McKay	5.19	3,659	212,600	
229	—	3	A	68	—	13 July 1965	Rushworth	—	—	—	
230	140	3	45	69	8	20 July 1965	Rushworth	5.40	3,760	105,400	
231	—	1	A	90	—	23 July 1965	Thompson	—	—	—	
232	—	1	A	91	—	27 July 1965	Thompson	—	—	—	
233	—	1	A	92	—	28 July 1965	Thompson	—	—	—	
234	141	2	41	73	8	3 August 1965	Rushworth	5.16	3,602	208,700	
235	142	1	56	93	8	6 August 1965	Thompson	5.15	3,534	103,200	
236	143	3	46	70	3	10 August 1965	Engle	5.20	3,550	271,000	U.S. spaceflight.
237	—	1	A	94	—	20 August 1965	Thompson	—	—	—	
238	—	1	A	95	—	24 August 1965	Thompson	—	—	—	
239	144	1	57	96	3	25 August 1965	Thompson	5.11	3,604	214,100	Thompson's last free flight.
240	145	3	47	71	8	26 August 1965	Rushworth	4.79	3,372	239,600	
241	146	2	42	74	8	2 September 1965	McKay	5.16	3,570	239,800	
242	147	1	58	97	8	9 September 1965	Rushworth	5.25	3,534	97,200	
243	148	3	48	72	8	14 September 1965	McKay	5.03	3,519	239,000	
244	149	1	59	98	3	22 September 1965	Rushworth	5.18	3,550	100,300	
245	150	3	49	73	3	28 September 1965	McKay	5.33	3,732	295,600	U.S. spaceflight.
246	151	1	60	99	3	30 September 1965	Knight	4.06	2,718	76,600	Knight's first free flight.
247	—	1	A	100	—	8 October 1965	Engle	—	—	—	
248	152	3	50	74	8	12 October 1965	Knight	4.62	3,108	94,400	
249	153	1	61	101	3	14 October 1965	Engle	5.08	3,554	266,500	U.S. spaceflight. Engle's last free flight.
250	154	3	51	75	3	27 October 1965	McKay	5.06	3,519	236,900	
251	—	1	A	102	—	2 November 1965	Dana	—	—	—	Dana's first time aloft.
252	155	2	43	75	3	3 November 1965	Rushworth	2.31	1,500	70,600	
253	156	1	62	103	8	4 November 1965	Dana	4.22	2,765	80,200	Dana's first free flight.
254	—	2	A	76	—	13 April 1966	Rushworth	—	—	—	
255	—	2	A	77	—	20 April 1966	Rushworth	—	—	—	
256	—	2	A	78	—	5 May 1966	Rushworth	—	—	—	
257	157	1	63	104	3	6 May 1966	McKay	2.21	1,434	68,400	
258	158	2	44	79	3	18 May 1966	Rushworth	5.43	3,689	99,000	
259	—	1	A	105	—	2 June 1966	McKay	—	—	—	
260	—	1	A	106	—	10 June 1966	McKay	—	—	—	
261	—	3	A	76	—	20 June 1966	Dana	—	—	—	
262	—	2	C	80	—	27 June 1966	Rushworth	—	—	—	
263	159	2	45	81	8	1 July 1966	Rushworth	1.70	1,061	44,800	Rushworth's last free flight.
264	160	1	64	107	3	12 July 1966	Knight	5.34	3,652	130,000	
265	—	3	A	77	—	13 July 1966	Dana	—	—	—	
266	161	3	52	78	3	18 July 1966	Dana	4.71	3,217	96,100	
267	—	2	A	82	—	20 July 1966	Knight	—	—	—	
268	162	2	46	83	3	21 July 1966	Knight	5.12	3,568	192,300	
269	163	1	65	108	8	28 July 1966	McKay	5.19	3,702	241,800	
270	164	2	47	84	8	3 August 1966	Knight	5.03	3,440	249,000	
271	165	3	53	79	8	4 August 1966	Dana	5.34	3,693	132,700	
272	—	1	A	109	—	9 August 1966	McKay	—	—	—	
273	—	1	A	110	—	10 August 1966	McKay	—	—	—	
274	166	1	66	111	3	11 August 1966	McKay	5.21	3,590	251,000	
275	167	2	48	85	3	12 August 1966	Knight	5.02	3,472	231,100	
276	168	3	54	80	3	19 August 1966	Dana	5.20	3,607	178,000	
277	169	1	67	112	3	25 August 1966	McKay	5.11	3,543	257,500	
278	170	2	49	86	8	30 August 1966	Knight	5.21	3,543	102,200	
279	171	1	68	113	8	8 September 1966	McKay	2.44	1,602	73,200	McKay's last free flight.
280	—	3	A	81	—	13 September 1966	Dana	—	—	—	
281	172	3	55	82	3	14 September 1966	Dana	5.12	3,586	254,200	
282	—	1	A	114	—	28 September 1966	Adams	—	—	—	Adams' first time aloft.
283	—	1	A	115	—	4 October 1966	Adams	—	—	—	
284	173	1	69	116	3	6 October 1966	Adams	3.00	1,977	75,400	Adams' first free flight.
285	—	2	A	87	—	7 October 1966	Knight	—	—	—	
286	—	2	A	88	—	19 October 1966	Knight	—	—	—	
287	174	3	56	83	3	1 November 1966	Dana	5.46	3,750	306,900	U.S. spaceflight.
288	—	3	A	84	—	18 November 1966	Dana	—	—	—	
289	175	2	50	89	8	18 November 1966	Knight	6.33	4,250	98,900	Second fastest flight
290	—	3	A	85	—	23 November 1966	Adams	—	—	—	
291	176	3	57	86	3	29 November 1966	Adams	4.65	3,120	92,100	
292	—	2	C	90	—	22 December 1966	Knight	—	—	—	
293	—	1	A	117	—	15 March 1967	Adams	—	—	—	
294	—	1	A	118	—	21 March 1967	Adams	—	—	—	
295	177	1	70	119	3	22 March 1967	Adams	5.59	3,822	133,100	
296	—	1	A	120	—	20 April 1967	Adams	—	—	—	
297	178	3	58	87	8	26 April 1967	Dana	1.80	1,163	53,400	
298	179	1	71	121	3	28 April 1967	Adams	5.44	3,720	167,200	
299	—	2	A	91	—	5 May 1967	Knight	—	—	—	
300	180	2	51	92	8	8 May 1967	Knight	4.75	3,193	97,600	
301	—	3	A	88	—	12 May 1967	Dana	—	—	—	
302	181	3	59	89	3	17 May 1967	Dana	4.80	3,177	71,100	
303	—	1	A	122	—	26 May 1967	Adams	—	—	—	
304	—	1	A	123	—	1 June 1967	Adams	—	—	—	
305	—	1	A	124	—	14 June 1967	Adams	—	—	—	
306	182	1	72	125	3	15 June 1967	Adams	5.14	3,606	229,300	
307	183	3	60	90	8	22 June 1967	Dana	5.34	3,611	82,200	
308	184	1	73	126	8	29 June 1967	Knight	4.23	2,870	173,000	
309	185	3	61	91	8	20 July 1967	Dana	5.44	3,693	84,300	
310	—	2	C	93	—	7 August 1967	Knight	—	—	—	
311	—	2	A	94	—	11 August 1967	Knight	—	—	—	
312	—	2	A	95	—	16 August 1967	Knight	—	—	—	
313	186	2	52	96	8	21 August 1967	Knight	4.94	3,368	91,000	
314	187	3	62	92	3	25 August 1967	Adams	4.63	3,115	84,400	
315	—	3	A	93	—	22 September 1967	Dana	—	—	—	
316	188	2	53	97	8	3 October 1967	Knight	6.70	4,520	102,100	Highest Mach and speed records of program. The X-15A-2's last free flight. Craft retired after setting records.
317	189	3	63	94	3	4 October 1967	Dana	5.53	3,897	251,100	
318	190	3	64	95	8	17 October 1967	Knight	5.53	3,856	280,500	U.S. spaceflight.
319	—	3	A	96	—	31 October 1967	Adams	—	—	—	
320	191	3	65	97	8	15 November 1967	Adams	5.20	3,570	266,000	U.S. spaceflight. The X-15-3's last free flight. Adams' last free flight. Fatal disaster.
321	—	1	C	127	—	6 February 1968	Dana	—	—	—	
322	—	1	A	128	—	7 February 1968	Dana	—	—	—	
323	—	1	A	129	—	27 February 1968	Dana	—	—	—	
324	192	1	74	130	8	1 March 1968	Dana	4.36	2,878	104,500	
325	—	1	A	131	—	28 March 1968	Dana	—	—	—	
326	—	1	A	132	—	3 April 1968	Dana	—	—	—	
327	193	1	75	133	8	4 April 1968	Dana	5.27	3,610	187,500	
328	194	1	76	134	8	26 April 1968	Knight	5.05	3,545	209,600	
329	—	1	A	135	—	23 May 1968	Dana	—	—	—	
330	195	1	77	136	8	12 June 1968	Dana	5.15	3,563	220,100	
331	—	1	A	137	—	15 July 1968	Knight	—	—	—	
332	196	1	78	138	3	16 July 1968	Knight	4.79	3,382	221,500	
333	197	1	79	139	3	21 August 1968	Dana	5.01	3,443	267,500	U.S. spaceflight.
334	198	1	80	140	3	13 September 1968	Knight	5.37	3,723	254,100	Knight's last free flight.
335	199	1	81	141	3	24 October 1968	Dana	5.38	3,716	255,000	The X-15-1's last free flight. Dana's last free flight. Last free flight of program.
336	—	1	A	142	—	12 December 1968	Knight	—	—	—	The X-15-1's last time aloft. Knight's last time aloft. Last time aloft of program.

== See also ==
- List of human spaceflights, 1961–1970
- List of Space Shuttle missions
- SpaceShipOne
- SpaceShipTwo
