= Flight 91 =

Flight 91 or Flight 091 may refer to:

- X-15 Flight 91, 1963 American human spaceflight mission
- Mandala Airlines Flight 091, airplane crashed on 5 September 2005
- Cougar Helicopters Flight 91, helicopter crashed on 12 March 2009
