= Flight 197 =

Flight 197 may refer to:

Listed chronologically

- X-15 Flight 197, an experimental flight on 16 November 1964
- Tara Air Flight 197, crashed on 29 May 2022
