= X-15 Flight 35 =

First human flight into the mesosphere

Flight 35
- Mission type: Test flight
- Operator: USAF/NASA
- Apogee: 169,600 feet (51.7 km; 32.12 mi)

Spacecraft properties
- Spacecraft: X-15
- Manufacturer: North American

Crew
- Crew size: 1
- Members: Joseph A. Walker

Start of mission
- Launch date: March 30, 1961 UTC

End of mission
- Landing date: March 30, 1961 UTC
- Landing site: Rogers Dry Lake, Edwards

Flight 35 of the North American X-15 was a test flight conducted by NASA and the US Air Force on March 30, 1961. The X-15 was piloted by Joseph A. Walker to an altitude of 169,600 feet (51.7 km; 32.12 mi) surpassing the stratopause. Thus Walker became the first human to reach the mesosphere. This human altitude record lasted about two weeks, until Yuri Gagarin became the first man in space on Vostok 1 on April 12, 1961. Joe Walker would later pilot the X-15 into space. The flight landed at Edwards Air Force Base.
