= X-15 Flight 90 =

1963 American crewed sub-orbital spaceflight

Flight 90
- Mission type: Test flight
- Operator: US Air Force/NASA
- Mission duration: 11 minutes, 24 seconds
- Distance travelled: 534 kilometers (332 mi)
- Apogee: 106.01 kilometers (65.87 mi)

Spacecraft properties
- Spacecraft: X-15
- Manufacturer: North American
- Launch mass: 15,195 kilograms (33,499 lb)
- Landing mass: 6,260 kilograms (13,800 lb)
- Dry mass: 6,577 kilograms (14,500 lb)

Crew
- Crew size: 1
- Members: Joseph A. Walker

Start of mission
- Launch date: July 19, 1963, 18:20:05 UTC
- Launch site: Balls 8, Edwards; Dropped over Smith Ranch Dry Lake; 39°20′N 117°29′W

End of mission
- Landing date: July 19, 1963, 18:31:29.1 UTC
- Landing site: Rogers Dry Lake, Edwards
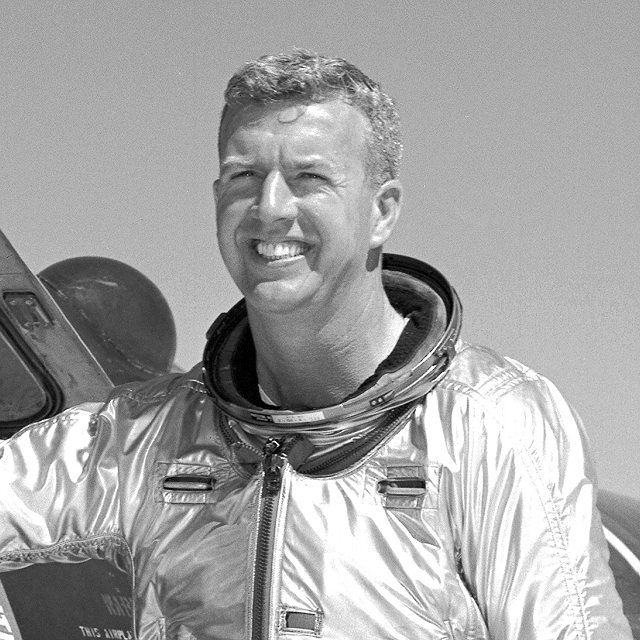
- X-15 Flight 90 pilot, Joe Walker

Flight 90 of the North American X-15 was a research flight conducted by NASA and the US Air Force on July 19, 1963. It was the first of two X-15 missions that passed the 100-km high Kármán line, the FAI definition of space, along with Flight 91 the next month. The X-15 was flown by Joseph A. Walker, who flew both X-15 spaceflights over the Kármán line.

== Crew ==
| Position | Astronaut |
|---|---|
| Pilot | (United States) Joseph A. Walker; First (FAI-recognized) / Second (U.S.-recognized) spaceflight |

== Mission parameters ==
- Mass: 15,195 kg fueled; 6,577 kg burnout; 6,260 kg landed
- Maximum Altitude: 106.01 km., 347,800 feet
- Range: 534 km
- Burn Time: 84.6 seconds
- Mach: 5.50
- Launch Vehicle: NB-52B Bomber #008

== Mission highlights ==
Maximum Speed - 5,971 km/h. Maximum Altitude - 106,010 m. 80 cm diameter balloon towed on 30 m line to measure air density. First X-15 flight over 100 km (a height known as the Kármán line). This made Walker the first US civilian in space. This was also the first spaceflight of a spaceplane in aviation history. First flight launched over Smith Dry Lake, NV. Experiments: Towed balloon, horizon scanner, photometer, infrared and ultraviolet. Balloon instrumentation failed.

The mission was flown by X-15 #3, serial 56–6672 on its 21st flight.

Launched by: NB-52B #008, Pilots Fulton & Bement. Takeoff: 17:19. UTC Landing: 19:04 UTC.

Chase pilots: Crews, Dana, Rogers, Daniel and Wood.

The X-15 engine burned about 85 seconds. Near the end of the burn, acceleration built up to about 4g (39 m/s²). Weightlessness lasted for 3 to 5 minutes. Re-entry heating warmed the exterior of the X-15 to 650 °C in places. During pull up after re-entry, the acceleration built up to 5g (49 m/s²) for 20 seconds. The entire flight lasted about 12 minutes from launch to landing.
