= X-15 Flight 87 =

1963 American crewed sub-orbital spaceflight

The Flight Of 87
- Mission type: Test flight
- Operator: USAF/NASA
- Apogee: 86.7 kilometers (53.9 mi)

Spacecraft properties
- Spacecraft: X-15
- Manufacturer: North American

Crew
- Crew size: 1
- Members: Robert A. Rushworth

Start of mission
- Launch date: June 27, 1963 UTC

End of mission
- Landing date: June 27, 1963 UTC
- Landing site: Rogers Dry Lake, Edwards

Flight 87 of the North American X-15 was a sub-orbital spaceflight conducted by NASA and the US Air Force on 27 June 1963. The X-15 was piloted by astronaut Robert A. Rushworth to an altitude of 86.7 km (53.9 mi) surpassing the U.S. definition of space. The X-15 was NASA's first space vehicle (the Mercury capsule flew into space first, but the X-15 was airborne before Big Joe 1). The Flight landed at Edwards Air Force Base. With this Rushworth was qualifying for his astronaut wings.

| Position | Astronaut |
|---|---|
| Pilot | (United States) Robert A. Rushworth; First spaceflight |
