= X-15 Flight 91 =

1963 American crewed sub-orbital spaceflight

Flight 91
- Mission type: Test flight
- Operator: US Air Force/NASA
- Mission duration: 11 minutes, 8.6 seconds
- Distance travelled: 543.4 kilometers (337.7 mi)
- Apogee: 107.96 kilometers (67.08 mi)

Spacecraft properties
- Spacecraft: X-15
- Manufacturer: North American
- Launch mass: 15,195 kilograms (33,499 lb)
- Landing mass: 6,260 kilograms (13,800 lb)
- Dry mass: 6,577 kilograms (14,500 lb)

Crew
- Crew size: 1
- Members: Joseph A. Walker

Start of mission
- Launch date: August 22, 1963, 18:05:57 UTC
- Launch site: NB-52A #52-003, Edwards; Dropped over Smith Ranch Dry Lake; 39°20′N 117°29′W

End of mission
- Landing date: August 22, 1963, 18:17:05 UTC
- Landing site: Rogers Dry Lake, Edwards
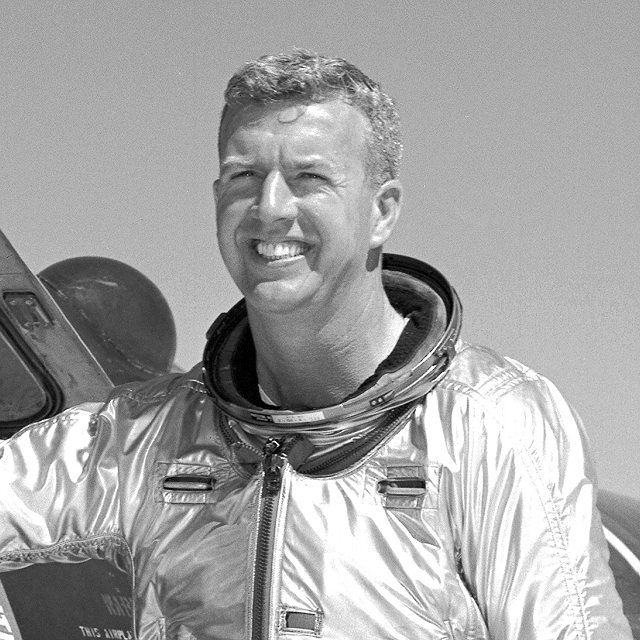
- Joe Walker

X-15 Flight 91 was an August 22, 1963 American crewed sub-orbital spaceflight, and the second and final flight in the program to fly above the Kármán line, which was previously achieved during Flight 90 a month earlier by the same pilot, Joseph A. Walker. It was the highest flight of the X-15 program.

Flight 91 was the first internationally recognized spaceflight of a reused spacecraft, as Walker had also flown plane number three on the previous sub-orbital spaceflight over the Kármán line on July 19. The flight was air-launched from a modified Boeing B-52 Stratofortress support plane over Smith Ranch Dry Lake, Nevada, United States. Walker piloted the X-15 to an altitude of 107.96 km and remained weightless for approximately five minutes. The altitude was the highest crewed flight by a spaceplane to that time, and remained the record until the 1981 flight of Space Shuttle Columbia.

Walker landed the X-15 about 12 minutes after it was launched, at Rogers Dry Lake, Edwards Airforce Base, in California. This was Walker's final X-15 flight.

== Crew ==
| Position | Astronaut |
|---|---|
| Pilot | (United States) Joseph A. Walker; Second (FAI-recognized) / Third (U.S.-recognized) and last spaceflight |

== Mission parameters ==
- Mass: 15,195 kg fueled; 6,577 kg burnout; 6,260 kg landed
- Maximum altitude: 107.96 km
- Range: 543.4 km
- Burn time: 85.8 seconds
- Mach: 5.58
- Launch vehicle: NB-52A Bomber #003

== Mission highlights ==
On this flight, Joe Walker became the first person to enter space twice. He had a maximum speed of 3,794 miles per hour (6,106 km/h) and a maximum altitude of 354,200 feet (108,000 m). Second and final X-15 flight over 67 miles (108 km). Unofficial altitude record set for class. Highest altitude achieved by X-15. Last flight for Walker in X-15 program. Number 1 left RCS nozzle froze up. First flight with altitude predictor instrument (needed calibration).

The mission was flown by X-15 #3, serial 56-6672 on its 22nd flight.

Launched by: NB-52A #003, Pilots Russell Bement & Lewis. Takeoff: 17:09 UTC. Landing: 18:56 UTC.

Chase pilots: Wood, Dana, Gordon and Rogers.

The X-15 engine burned about 85 seconds. Near the end of the burn, acceleration built up to about 4 G (39 m/s²). Weightlessness lasted for 3 to 5 minutes. Re-entry heating warmed the exterior of the X-15 to 650°C in places. During pull-up after re-entry, acceleration built up to 5 G (49 m/s²) for 20 seconds. The entire flight was about 12 minutes from launch to landing.
