= Kármán line =

Conventional definition of the edge of space

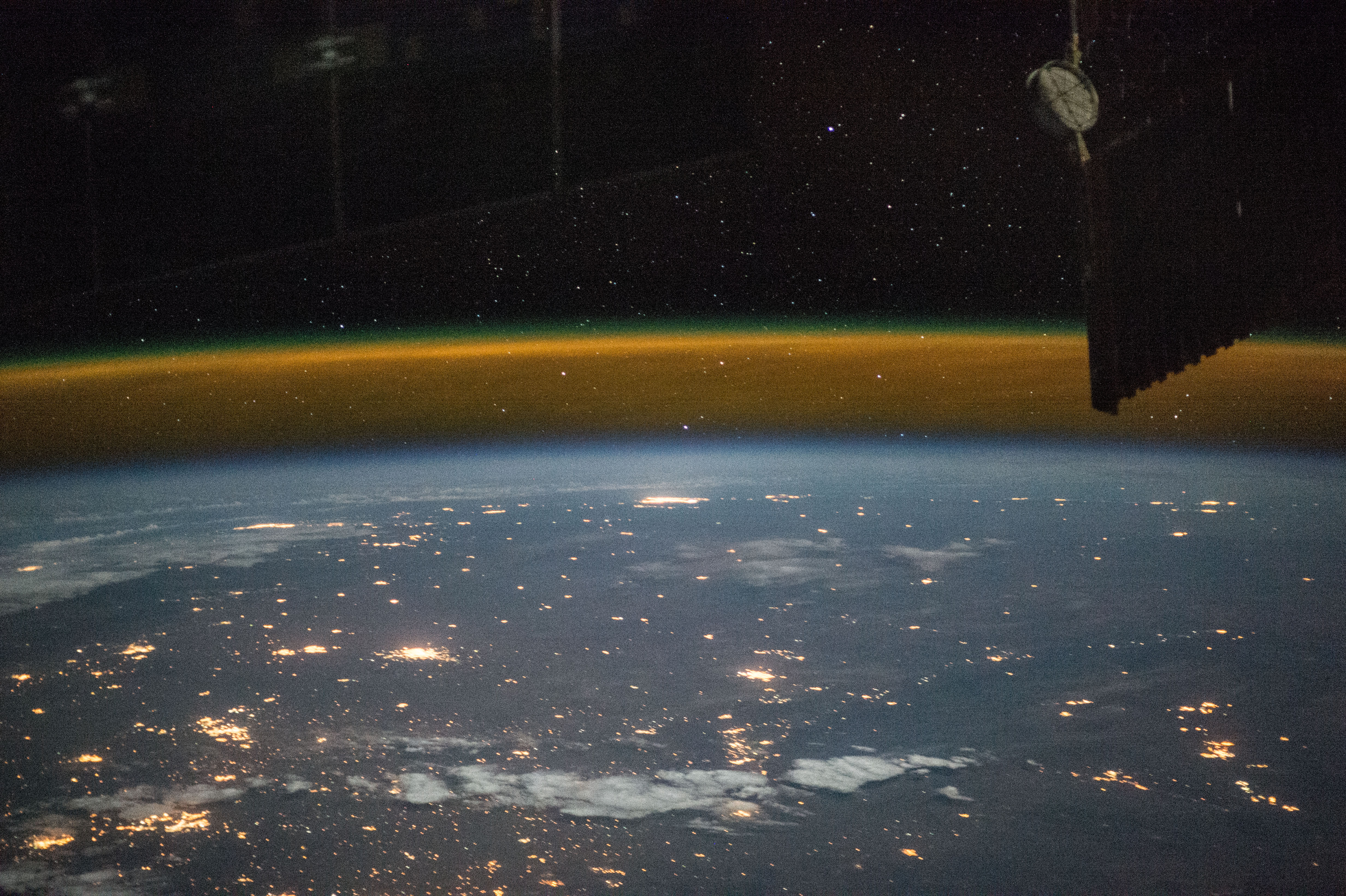
Earth's atmosphere photographed from the International Space Station. The orange and green line of airglow is at roughly the altitude of the Kármán line.

The Kármán line (or von Kármán line /vɒn ˈkɑːrmɑːn/) is a conventional definition of the edge of space; it is widely but not universally accepted. The international record-keeping body FAI (Fédération aéronautique internationale) defines the Kármán line at an altitude of 100 kilometres (54 nautical miles; 62 miles; 328,084 feet) above mean sea level.

While named after Theodore von Kármán, who calculated a theoretical limit of altitude for aeroplane flight at 83.8 km (52.1 mi) above Earth, the later-established Kármán line is more general and has no distinct physical significance, in that there is a rather gradual difference between the characteristics of the atmosphere at the line, and experts disagree on defining a distinct boundary where the atmosphere ends and space begins. It lies well above the altitude reachable by conventional airplanes or high-altitude balloons, and it is approximately where satellites, even on very eccentric trajectories, will decay before completing a single orbit.

The Kármán line is mainly used for legal and regulatory purposes of differentiating between aircraft and spacecraft, which are then subject to different jurisdictions and legislations. While international law does not define the edge of space, or the limit of national airspace, most international organizations and regulatory agencies (including the United Nations) accept the FAI's Kármán line definition or something close to it. As defined by the FAI, the Kármán line was established in the 1960s. Various countries and entities define space's boundary differently for various purposes.

== Definition ==
The layers of Earth's atmosphere with the Kármán line indicated (not to scale)

The FAI utilizes the Kármán line to establish a formal boundary between the realms of aeronautics and astronautics. According to their definitions, any aerial activity or air sport occurring within 100 kilometers of the Earth's surface is classified as aeronautics, while any activity conducted above that 100-kilometer threshold is considered astronautics.

== Interpretations of the definition ==
The expressions "edge of space" or "near space" are often used (by, for instance, the FAI in some of their publications) to refer to a region below the boundary of Outer Space, which is often meant to include substantially lower regions as well. Thus, certain balloon or airplane flights might be described as "reaching the edge of space". In such statements, "reaching the edge of space" merely refers to going higher than average aeronautical vehicles commonly would.

There is still no international legal definition of the demarcation between a country's air space and outer space. In 1963, Andrew G. Haley discussed the Kármán line in his book Space Law and Government. In a chapter on the limits of national sovereignty, he made a survey of major writers' opinions. He indicated the inherent imprecision of the Line:

In essence, the line represents a mean or "median" measurement. It is comparable to such measures used in the law as "mean sea level", "meander line", "tide line"; but it is more complex than these. In arriving at the von Kármán jurisdictional line, myriad factors must be considered – other than the factor of aerodynamic lift. These factors have been discussed in a very large body of literature and by a score or more of commentators. They include the physical constitution of the air; the biological and physiological viability; and still other factors which logically join to establish a point at which air no longer exists and at which airspace ends.

== Kármán's comments ==
In the final chapter of his autobiography, Kármán addresses the issue of the edge of outer space:

Where space begins ... can actually be determined by the speed of the space vehicle and its altitude above the Earth. Consider, for instance, the record flight of Captain Iven Carl Kincheloe Jr. in an X-2 rocket plane. Kincheloe flew 2000 miles per hour (3,200 km/h) at 126,000 feet (38,500 m), or 24 miles up. At this altitude and speed, aerodynamic lift still carries 98 percent of the weight of the plane, and only two percent is carried by inertia, or Kepler force, as space scientists call it. But at 300,000 feet (91,440 m) or 57 miles up, this relationship is reversed because there is no longer any air to contribute lift: only inertia prevails. This is certainly a physical boundary, where aerodynamics stops and astronautics begins, and so I thought why should it not also be a jurisdictional boundary? Andrew G. Haley has termed it the Kármán Jurisdictional Line. Below this line, space belongs to each country. Above this level there would be free space.

== Technical considerations ==
No atmosphere abruptly ends, instead becoming progressively less dense with altitude. Depending on how the various layers that make up the space around the Earth are defined (and depending on whether these layers are considered part of the actual atmosphere), the definition of the edge of space could vary considerably: If one were to consider the thermosphere and exosphere part of the atmosphere and not of space, one might have to extend the boundary of space to at least 10,000 km (6,200 miles) above sea level. The Kármán line thus is a largely arbitrary definition based on some technical considerations.

An aircraft can stay aloft only by constantly traveling forward relative to the air (rather than the ground), so that the wings can generate aerodynamic lift. The thinner the air, the faster the plane must go to generate enough lift to stay up. At very high speeds, centrifugal force (Kepler force) contributes to maintaining altitude. This is the virtual force that keeps satellites in circular orbit without any aerodynamic lift.

As altitude increases and air density decreases, the speed to generate enough aerodynamic lift to support the aircraft weight increases until the speed becomes so high that the centrifugal force contribution becomes significant. At a high enough altitude, the centrifugal force will dominate over the lift force and the aircraft would become effectively an orbiting spacecraft instead of an aircraft supported by aerodynamic lift.

In 1956, von Kármán presented a paper in which he discussed aerothermal limits to flight. The faster aircraft fly, the more heat they would generate due to aerodynamic heating from friction with the atmosphere and adiabatic processes. Based on the then-current state of the art, he calculated the speeds and altitudes at which continuous flight was possible—fast enough that enough lift would be generated and slow enough that the vehicle would not overheat. The chart included an inflection point at around 275,000 feet (52.08 mi; 83.82 km), above which an aircraft's structure would fail (melt). Von Kármán's 1956 paper never mentioned "orbit" or "outer space;" rather, he theorized a thermal barrier to atmospheric flight based on then-existing materials.

The term "Kármán line" was invented by Andrew G. Haley in a 1959 paper, based on the chart in von Kármán's 1956 paper, but Haley acknowledged that the 275,000 feet (52.08 mi; 83.82 km) limit was theoretical and would change as technology improved, as the minimum speed in von Kármán's calculations was based on the speed-to-weight ratio of existing aircraft, namely the Bell X-2, and the maximum speed based on cooling technologies and heat-resistant materials. Haley also cited other technical considerations for that altitude, as it was approximately the altitude limit for an airbreathing jet engine based on existing technology. In the same 1959 paper, Haley also referred to 295,000 feet (55.9 mi; 90 km) as the "von Kármán Line", which was the lowest altitude at which free-radical atomic oxygen occurred.

== Alternatives to the FAI definition ==
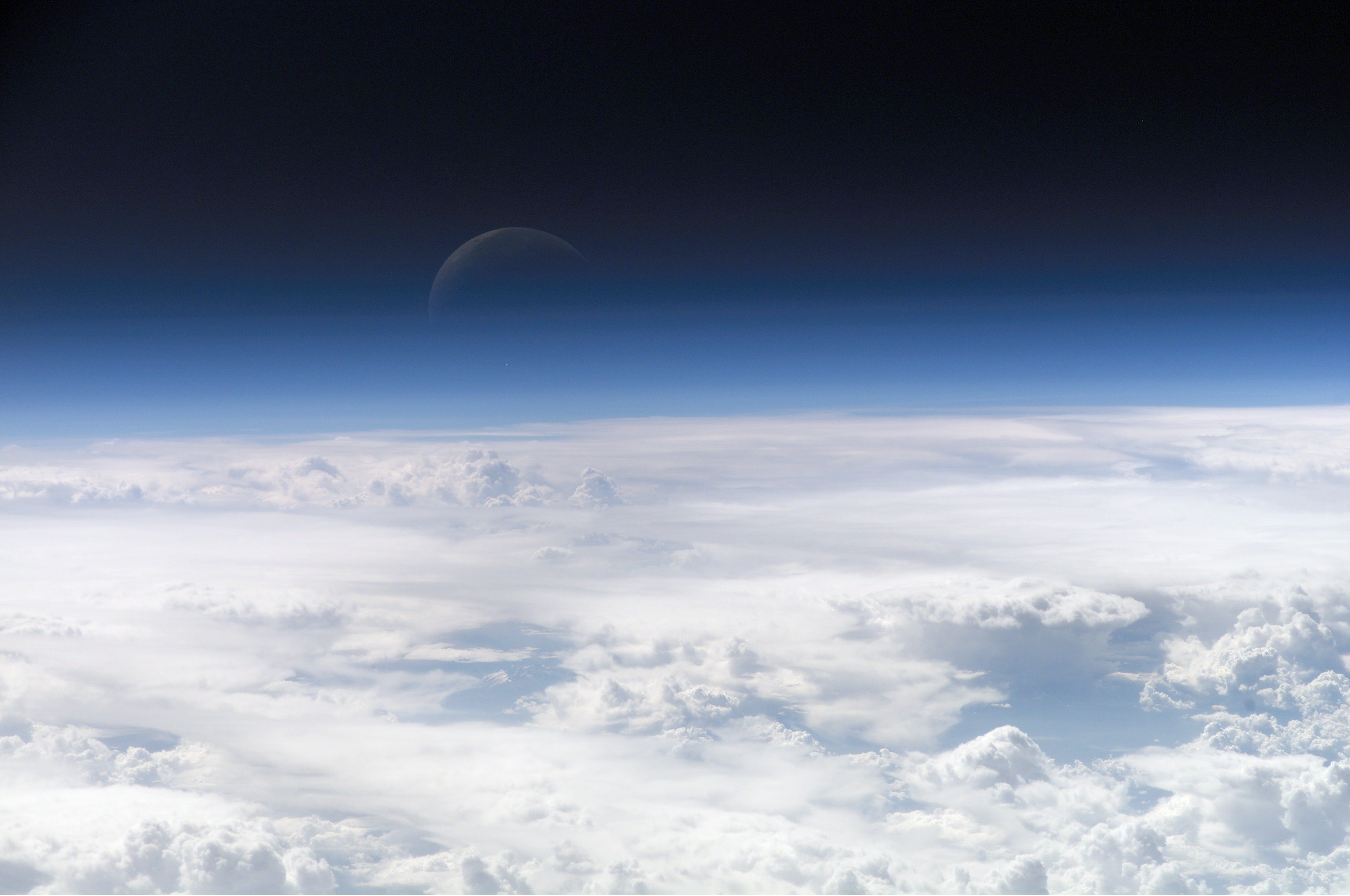
Atmospheric gases scatter the blue wavelengths, thus giving the Earth a blue arc. As the altitude increases the atmosphere decreases such that by several criteria it ceases to exist. Optically the atmospheric halo here gradually fades into the blackness of space.

The U.S. Armed Forces definition of an astronaut is a person who has flown higher than 50 miles (80 km) above mean sea level, approximately the line between the mesosphere and the thermosphere. NASA formerly used the FAI's 100-kilometre (62-mile) figure, though this was changed in 2005 to eliminate any inconsistency between military personnel and civilians flying in the same vehicle. Three veteran NASA X-15 pilots (John B. McKay, William H. Dana and Joseph Albert Walker) were retroactively (two posthumously) awarded their astronaut wings, as they had flown between 90 km (56 miles) and 108 km (67 miles) during the 1960s, but at the time had not been recognized as astronauts. The latter altitude, achieved twice by Walker, exceeds the modern international definition of the boundary of space.

The United States Federal Aviation Administration also recognizes this line as a space boundary:

Suborbital Flight: Suborbital spaceflight occurs when a spacecraft reaches space but its velocity is such that it cannot achieve orbit. Many people believe that in order to achieve spaceflight, a spacecraft must reach an altitude higher than 100 kilometers (62 miles) above sea level.

Works by Jonathan McDowell (Harvard-Smithsonian Center for Astrophysics) and Thomas Gangale (University of Nebraska-Lincoln) in 2018 advocate that the demarcation of space should be at 80 km (50 mi; 260,000 ft), citing as evidence von Kármán's original notes and calculations (which theorized that at an altitude of 275,000 ft (84,000 m), an aircraft would need to fly so fast that frictional heating would cause structural failure of materials then known; his assumptions were superseded by subsequent technological developments), confirmation that orbiting objects can survive multiple perigees at altitudes around 80 to 90 km, plus functional, cultural, physical, technological, mathematical, and historical factors. More precisely, the paper summarizes:

To summarize, the lowest possible sustained circular orbits are at of order 125 km altitude, but elliptical orbits with perigees at 100 km can survive for long periods. In contrast, Earth satellites with perigees below 80 km are highly unlikely to complete their next orbit. It is noteworthy that meteors (travelling much more quickly) usually disintegrate in the 70–100 km altitude range, adding to the evidence that this is the region where the atmosphere becomes important.

These findings prompted the FAI to propose holding a joint conference with the International Astronautical Federation (IAF) in 2019 to "fully explore" the issue.

Another definition proposed in international law discussions defines the lower boundary of space as the lowest perigee attainable by an orbiting space vehicle, but does not specify an altitude. This is the definition adopted by the U.S. military. Due to atmospheric drag, the lowest altitude at which an object in a circular orbit can complete at least one full revolution without propulsion is approximately 150 km (93 miles). The U.S. government is resisting efforts to specify a precise regulatory boundary.

== For other planets ==
While the Kármán line is defined for Earth only, several scientists have estimated the corresponding figures for Mars and Venus. Isidoro Martínez arrived at 80 km (50 miles) and 250 km (160 miles) high, respectively, while Nicolas Bérend arrived at 113 km (70 miles) and 303 km (188 miles).

== In popular culture ==
In 2014, Oscar Sharp directed The Kármán Line, a British live-action drama short film starring Olivia Colman as Sarah, a wife and mother who suddenly starts levitating until she slowly and eventually crosses the eponymous Kármán line and into outer space.

== See also ==
- Armstrong limit – Altitude above which water boils at body temperature
- Heterosphere – Upper atmospheric region where molecular diffusion dominates
