= Milton Rosen =

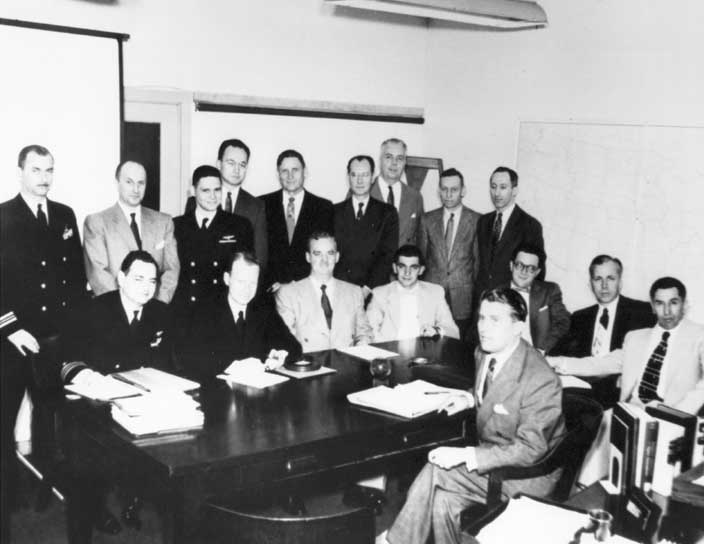
1955 Project Orbiter meeting, Rosen standing at the right rear, a few months before the NRL Vanguard was selected to launch first US satellite.

Milton William Rosen (July 25, 1915 – December 30, 2014) was a United States Navy engineer and project manager in the US space program between the end of World War II and the early days of the Apollo Program. He led development of the Viking and Vanguard rockets, and was influential in the critical decisions early in NASA's history that led to the definition of the Saturn rockets, which were central to the eventual success of the American Moon landing program. He died of prostate cancer in 2014.

== Early life ==
Rosen was born in Philadelphia and earned a BS degree in Electrical Engineering from the University of Pennsylvania in 1937. In 1940, he began work at the Naval Research Laboratory, and during World War II, he worked on missile guidance systems.

== Viking rocket program ==
After the end of WWII, Rosen worked at the US Naval Research Laboratory (NRL), where he was involved in the definition of alternative designs for high-altitude sounding rockets, both for scientific research on the upper atmosphere, and for development of liquid rocket technology for military purposes, following the German introduction of the large V-2 rocket weapon.

He became NRL project manager for the Viking rocket, which was the first large US liquid-fueled rocket. Roughly half the size, in terms of mass and power, of the V-2, the Viking improved upon it in several important respects. Both were actively guided, and fueled with the same propellants (alcohol and liquid oxygen [LOX]), which were fed to a single rocket engine by turbine-driven pumps. The Viking airframe was designed and built under contract to NRL by the Glenn L. Martin Company. The engine, built by Reaction Motors Inc (RMI) of New Jersey, was the largest liquid-fueled rocket engine developed in the United States up to that time. It produced 89 kN (20000 lbf) of thrust. As was also the case for the V-2, hydrogen peroxide was converted to steam to drive the turbo-pump that fed fuel and LOX into the engine.

In a series of twelve flights between September 1949 and February 1955, Viking rockets explored the characteristics of the atmosphere above 30 km, and set a number of performance records, including the highest altitude, 158 miles (254 km), reached by an American single-stage rocket up to that time.

== Project Vanguard ==
In the early 1950s, the American Rocket Society set up an ad hoc Committee on Space Flight, of which Rosen became the chair. Encouraged by conversations between Richard W. Porter of General Electric and Alan T. Waterman, Director of the National Science Foundation (NSF), Rosen on November 27, 1954, completed a report describing the potential value of launching an Earth satellite. The report was submitted to the NSF early in 1955.

When the US decided to orbit a scientific satellite during the International Geophysical Year (IGY), a 1955 proposal from NRL, to build a launch vehicle based on the Viking as a first stage with a second stage based on the smaller Aerobee sounding rocket was selected, and again Rosen was project manager. The maturity of the Viking and Aerobee rockets played an important role in the choice. However, there was also a strong hidden motive higher in the US government: to establish a precedent for overflight rights to Eastern Bloc territory with a non-military civilian research rocket, in preparation for the highly secret national reconnaissance satellite program then underway. This classified NRL proposal was the genesis of Project Vanguard.

Unfortunately for the timely success of the satellite project, many of the most experienced people at Martin were shifted to the high-priority Titan ICBM program, and the mature Viking team was largely lost to Project Vanguard. The resulting shock to US pride and perceptions of national security, when the Soviet Union launched Sputnik 1, the first artificial earth satellite, on October 4, 1957 (on the much larger R-7 rocket, developed as an ICBM), combined with the spectacular launch failure of the first complete Vanguard test launch December 6, 1957, is well known and recounted elsewhere. Thus the first US satellite, Explorer 1, was launched January 31, 1958, by a substantially larger Army Jupiter-C rocket, based on the Redstone missile, which had been developed by the Army Ballistic Missile Agency (ABMA) at Huntsville, Alabama under the leadership of Wernher von Braun. The first successful Vanguard satellite launching came on March 17, 1958. Its payload, Vanguard 1, is the oldest satellite currently in orbit, in addition to its upper launch stage.

== NASA and the Apollo program ==
Rosen went on after Vanguard to be involved in a number of important NASA studies and committees that helped to define the family of large launch vehicles, designed from the beginning not as missiles, but as space launchers, that were eventually to be key components of the Apollo program. He was the principal author of a report to President Eisenhower, dated January 27, 1959, which proposed three families of vehicles needed to support an ambitious National Space Program.

The smallest, based on the Atlas missile, included an ambitious variant with a liquid hydrogen (LH2) – liquid oxygen (LOX) upper stage. This Atlas–Centaur launcher was developed, after many difficulties, into the rocket that carried the critical Surveyor series of lunar landers, used to investigate the mechanical properties of the lunar surface, and to demonstrate the capability of soft-landing on rocket power which was an essential element of the lunar program. The early development of LH2–LOX technology also later proved critical to the capabilities of the Saturn family of large high-performance boosters.

The second family discussed, called Juno V at the time, eventually evolved into the Saturn I rockets, using clusters of eight medium-sized, 188,000 lbf (840 kN) thrust H-1 engines to yield 1,500,000 lbf (6,700 kN) liftoff thrust, and nine clustered propellant tanks adapted from the Army's existing Jupiter and Redstone rockets. Although based on available component hardware in order to speed development, these boosters were substantially larger than any in use anywhere at that time, and promised to give the US parity in launch capability in the developing space race. The third family was based on the very large, 1,500,000 lbf (6,700 kN) single-chambered F-1 engine then beginning development. These featured two to four engines clustered to yield up to 6 million lbf of lift-off thrust, and were the start of a series of designs that eventually led to the final five-engined, 7,500,000 lbf (33,000 kN) lift-off thrust Saturn V Moon rocket.

== See also ==
- Viking rocket
- Project Vanguard
- Vanguard rocket
- Saturn rocket
- Apollo Program
