= Leslie Cantwell collection =

Collection of space imagery

The Leslie Cantwell collection is a collection of large-format images of space and space exploration, signed and inscribed by astronauts from the Apollo Space programme. It was assembled by British collector Leslie Cantwell, who became interested in the history of space exploration in the late 1990s. The collection has been exhibited at the Proud Galleries of London, the Kansas Cosmosphere, and the New Mexico Museum of Art.

The collection comprises both originals and reprints of official NASA photographs, including images of all six Apollo Moon landings. Some images are original Hasselblad photographs (the official camera used on all Apollo missions). Many of the photographs were taken in space by the astronauts themselves; others were taken by NASA employees on the ground.
