= RTV-A-2 Hiroc =

20th-century US research project

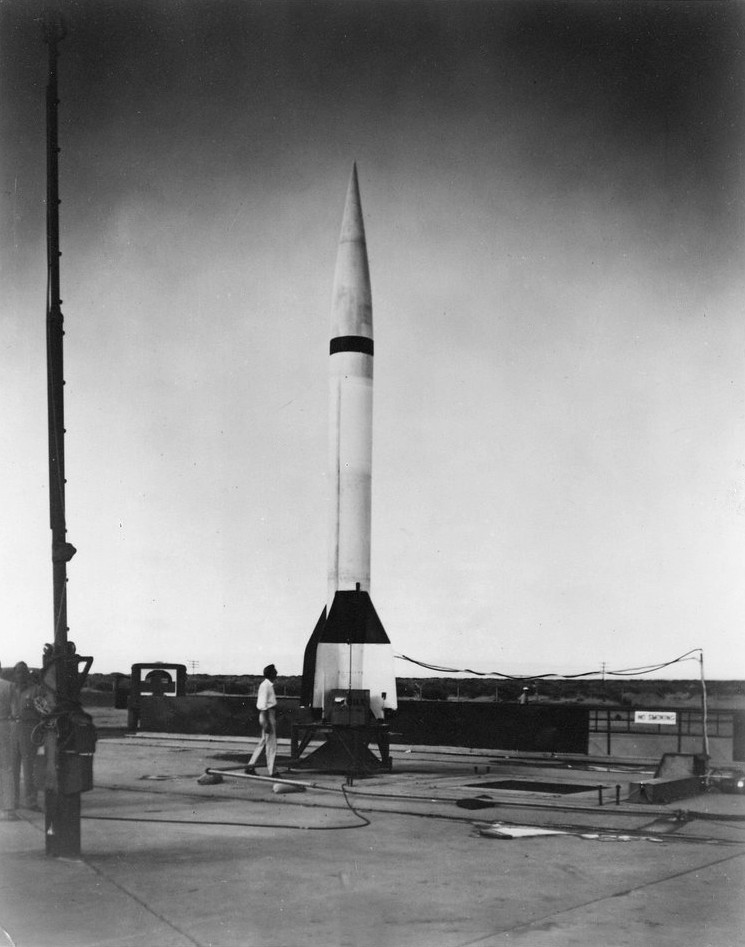
- Type: Supersonic Test Vehicle
- Place of origin: United States

Production history
- Designer: Consolidated-Vultee
- Designed: 1946
- No. built: 3

Specifications
- Mass: 1,205 pounds (547 kg) empty, 4,090 pounds (1,860 kg) full
- Length: 31.5 feet (9.6 m)
- Width: 6 feet 10 inches (2.08 m)
- Diameter: 30 inches (760 mm)
- Engine: One XLR35-RM-1 engine with four chambers 2,000 pounds-force (8.9 kN) each
- Propellant: Liquid oxygen as oxidizer Ethanol as fuel

The RTV-A-2 Hiroc (high-altitude rocket) was a product of the United States' first effort to develop an intercontinental ballistic missile (ICBM). The project was named MX-774. The project was canceled in 1947, but leftover funds were used to build and launch three of the planned 10 research vehicles designated RTV-A-2. The design included several innovations; the gimbaled thrust chambers provided guidance control, the internal gas pressure was used to support the airframe and the nose cap was separable. All of these concepts were later used on the Atlas missile and the first two on the Viking rocket. Also developed as part of MX-774 was the Azusa guidance system which was not used on the Hiroc missile but did contribute to the Atlas missile as well as many other early guided missiles launched from Cape Canaveral.

== Design ==
The Hiroc missiles were 31.5 feet (9.6 m) long, had a fin span (the maximum width of the rocket, accounting for the fins) of 6 feet 10 inches (2.08 m), a diameter of 30 inches (760 mm), an empty weight including payload of 1,205 pounds (547 kg) and a gross liftoff weight (GLOW) of 4,090 pounds (1,860 kg).

XLR35-RM-1 rocket engine

The missile's propulsion system consisted of an XLR35-RM-1 composed of four thrust chambers, built by Reaction Motors, which produced 2,000 lbf (8.9 kN) of thrust each and could independently swivel up to ten degrees on one axis. The gimbaling motion was used to control the flight path of the missile, replacing the system of the V-2 missile that used moving fins placed within a fixed engine. The gimbal system adds complexity to the engine mounting but preserves more of the energy of the rocket exhaust during maneuvering. The engine had a specific impulse of 210 s at sea level.

The Hiroc missile used liquid oxygen as its oxidizer, and alcohol for its fuel. The Hiroc missile did not have separate tanks for its fuel and oxidizer, which were instead contained in one tank separated by two bulkheads. The airframe of the rocket was supported by nitrogen gas pressure inside the tank, which could contain propellant or nitrogen gas when stored. Having gas pressure provide rigidity to the structure reduced the empty weight by requiring less metallic components for structural reinforcement, but made the missile fragile because it required continuous pressurization. The RTV-A-2 Hiroc had an airframe to propellant ratio three times better than the V-2.

The nose cone, which contained instrumentation, would separate from the rocket booster. This made the rocket lighter as only the nose cone and its instruments and recording camera had to be able to survive recovery, rather than the entire rocket. The unique innovations of the Hiroc missiles, such as the gimbaled thrust chambers, and the internal pressure supported airframe, would go on to be utilized in the Atlas rockets. Several changes were made in the Atlas, such as the aluminum used for the missiles airframe of the Hiroc, was changed to stainless steel in the Atlas. The early Atlas utilized the MX-774 project developed Azusa interferometry based guidance system which served Cape Canaveral during the early space age. The engines of the Atlas missiles were also much more powerful, generating a total of 150,000 lbf (670 kN) of thrust, compared to the Hiroc's total of 8,000 lbf (36 kN) thrust.

== History ==
In April 1946, then AVCO-owned Convair received a 1.9 million dollar contract from the US Government under Air Material Command designation Material, Experimental-774B (MX-774B) to investigate the development of ballistic missiles. This was one of a large number of missile projects being studied by the US Army at that time, which included both ballistic missiles and a variety of long-range cruise missiles as well. The original of MX-774B called for a missile that could deliver a 5,000 pounds (2,300 kg) payload 5,000 miles (8,000 km), and which had an accuracy that allowed it to deliver it to within 5,000 feet (1,500 m) of the target. The MX-774B project was headed by Karel Bossart, who would go on to head the creation of the Atlas rockets. Although development of the specification MX-774B was inspired by the German V-2 the MX-774B introduced several significant innovations, such as an integrated propellant tank, swiveling engines, pressurized body, and detachable nose cone.

As a result of drastic defense cuts in 1946 and for 1947 the USAAF's missile budget was cut in half from $29 to $13 million in what became known as "the black Christmas of 1946". Many of the projects were canceled outright, but MX-774 instead continued with reduced funding. The project was eventually canceled in June 1947 as the Army concentrated their efforts on cruise missiles, which were more promising at that time.

Convair arranged to use the remaining contract funding to launch three of the rockets, which were named RTV-A-2 Hiroc. The tests took place at White Sands Proving Grounds. The three tests took place on 13 July 1947, 27 September, and 2 December. These tests validated the concept of using gimbaled engines for propulsion and guidance.

Hiroc was flown from a pad 600 feet north the White Sands blockhouse. Tracking was provided Askania Cine theodolite, cameras, Sky-screen observers and four tracking telescopes and tracking radar. White Sands Proving Ground provided housing and support for the launch program.

On the RTV-A-2 (MX-774), a camera recorded the flight data displayed upon an instrument panel. Both the number of parameters recorded and the survivability of the film record were limited. Therefore, dependence upon the intact recovery of this camera was problematic.

During the test on 13 July, the Hiroc reached a maximum height of 6,200 feet (1,900 m), but lost thrust after 12.6 seconds and hit the ground at 48.5 seconds, 415 feet (126 m) from the launch pad. Due to a mistake in packing, the payload recovery parachute failed to open; a camera and a few other instruments survived, so the test was deemed a partial success.

During the test on 27 September, the Hiroc reached an altitude of 24 miles (39 km) at 48 seconds and a maximum velocity of 2,350 feet per second (720 m/s). The parachute failed again, this time due to a battery problem; the Hiroc began to freefall before its oxygen tank exploded at 20,000 feet (6,100 m). This caused it to break up, but a camera and some instruments survived.

During the test on 2 December, the Hiroc reached a maximum height of 30 miles (48 km) and reached a maximum velocity of 2,653 feet per second (809 m/s). The parachute failed to open yet again, this time due to the nose cone damaging it after being ejected, while the Hiroc was at an altitude of 121,000 feet (37,000 m) and moving at a speed of 1,500 feet per second (460 m/s). The camera was recovered, although it was partly damaged. The third Hiroc had its nose compartment extended 34 inches to allow more instrumentation.

All three Hiroc missiles had partially failed due to premature closure of the liquid oxygen valve. The cause of failure was determined from a light on the instrumentation coming on when the valve closed. The cause of the valve closing was traced to vibration of solenoids which caused pressure change in the hydrogen peroxide line which allowed nitrogen to vent from engine control lines with the resultant pressure drop closing the LOX valve.

In late 1948 the Air Force proposed the continuation of the MX-774 program with an additional 15 missiles for high altitude research but the proposal was refused by the Research and Development Board's Committee on Guided Missiles which decided that the more capable Navy Viking Missile RTV-N-12 was a superior high altitude research vehicle. Convair, by then owned by the Atlas Corporation, retained the core design team after program cancellation. That core led to Convair proposing a missile to meet the Air Force Request For Proposal MX-1593 which ultimately resulted in the Weapon System 107A, better known as the B-65/SM-65 Atlas, America's first ICBM.
