= Lovell Lawrence Jr. =

American rocket scientist

Lovell Lawrence Jr. (1915 – 1971) was an American rocket scientist who developed the first engine to break the sound barrier while working with Reaction Motors, Inc.

== Biography ==
Lovell Lawrence Jr. was born in 1915 to mining engineer, Lovell Lawrence Sr. and Ellen Lawrence in Pompton Lakes, New Jersey. Lawrence had two brothers, Robert M. Lawrence and Edmund Pond Lawrence. In 1942, three years before he would make significant breakthroughs in rocketry, Lawrence experience the death of his father, then living in Tucson, Arizona, at 54 years of age.

Lawrence Jr. died from cancer on January 24, 1971, at St. John's Hospital at 55 years of age.

== Career ==
Lovell Lawrence Jr. was a founding member of the American Rocket Society in the 1930s and erelong was named President in 1946. Between 1943 and 1941, Lawrence worked as assistant to the Chief Engineer of IBM. In 1941, Lawrence founded Reaction Motors, Inc. with John Shesta, James Wylde, and Hugh Franklin Pierce in order to secure an offered $5,000 Navy contract for rocket development. Reaction Motors, Inc. continued under the aegis of Lawrence until his departure in 1953 to pursue a variety of positions with Chrysler, culminating in his promotion to Chief Research Engineer in 1964.
