= Cosmosphere =

Space museum in Hutchinson, Kansas, US

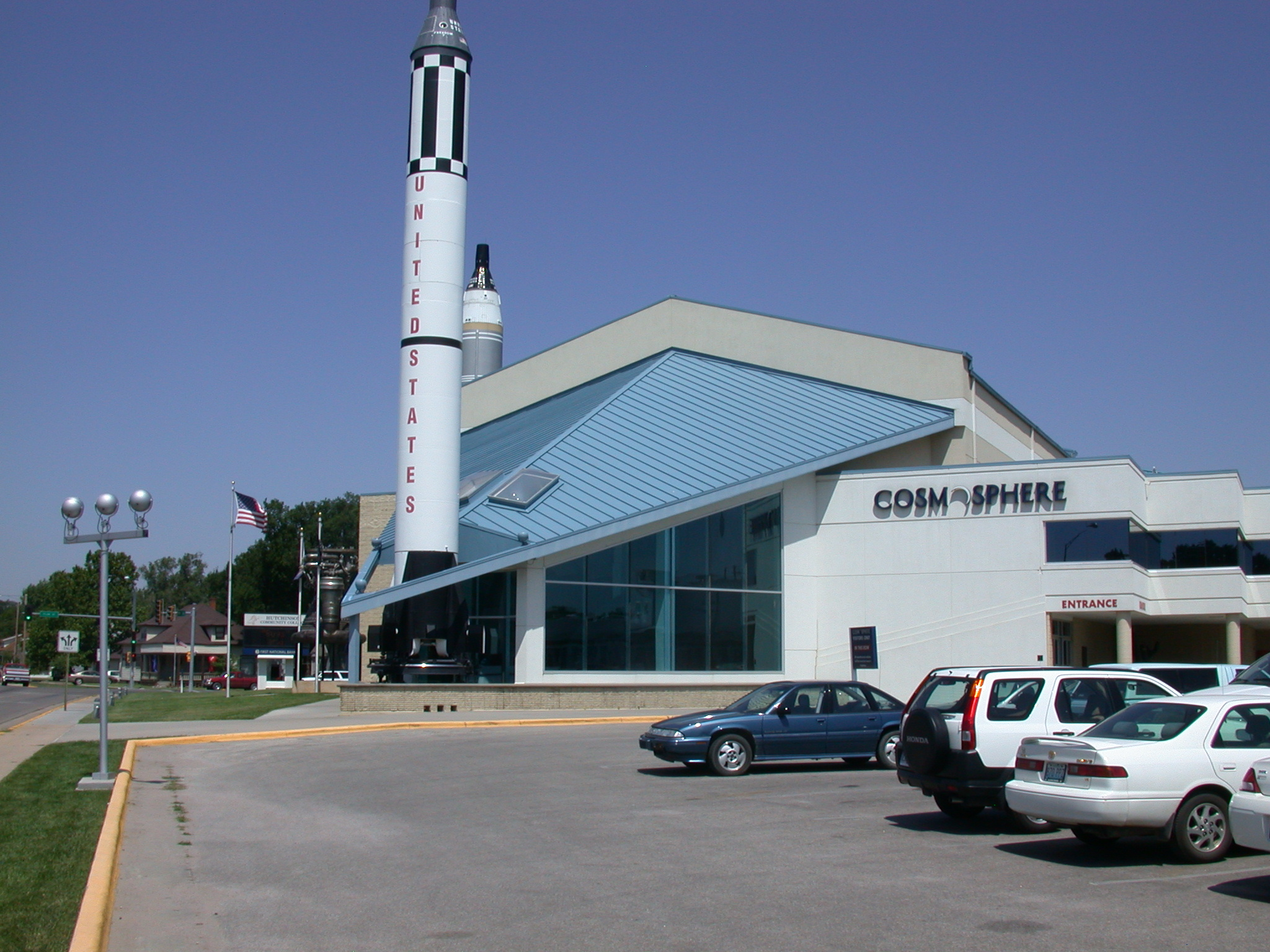
- Main entrance (2003)

- Location within Kansas Location within the United States
- Established: 1962; 64 years ago
- Location: 1100 North Plum Street; Hutchinson, KS 67501 USA
- Coordinates: 38°03′55″N 97°55′17″W
- Type: Space Museum
- Collection size: 15,000
- Visitors: 150,000 / year
- CEO: Jim Remar
- Website: cosmo.org

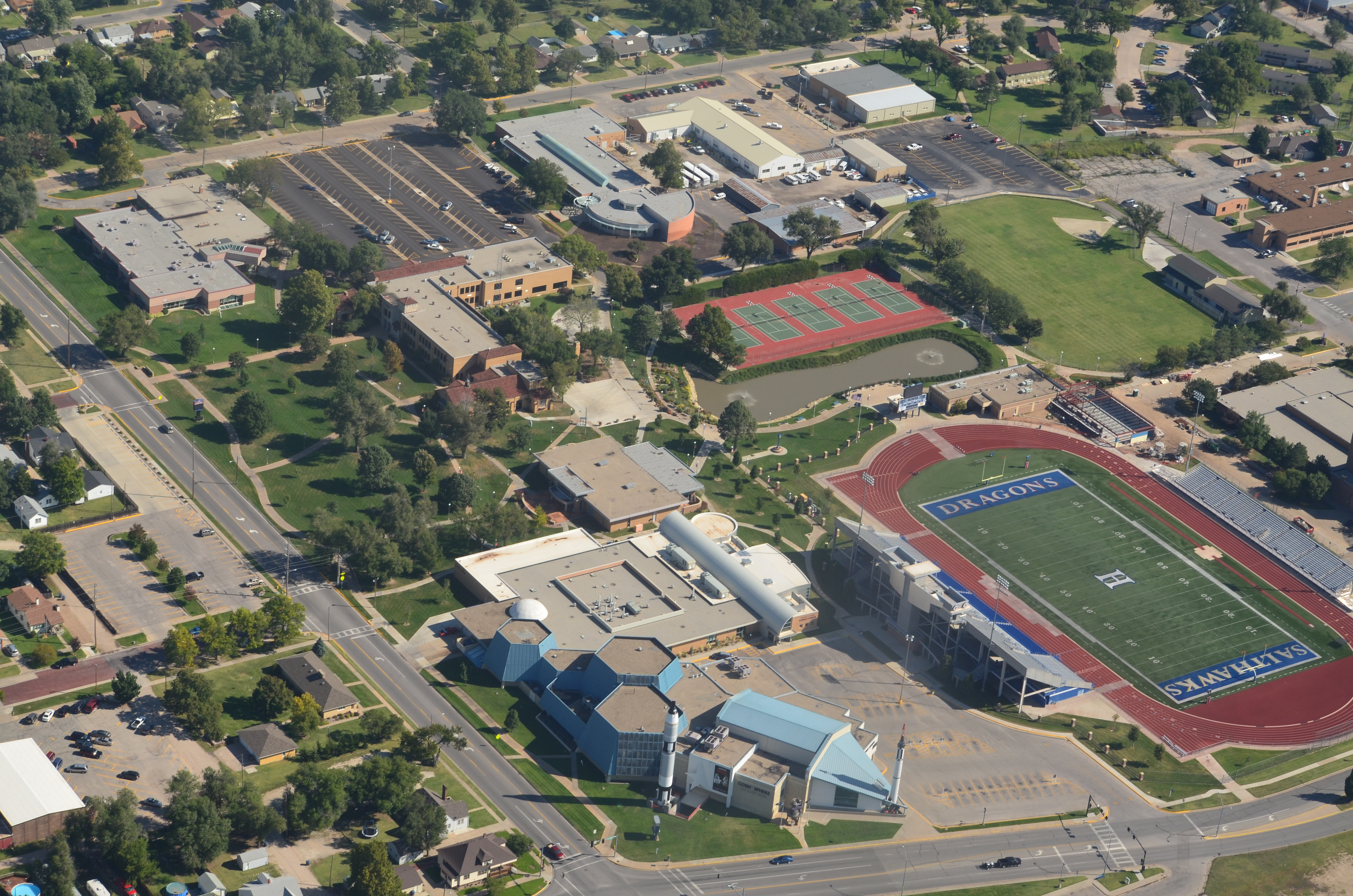
Aerial view of Kansas Cosmosphere and Hutchinson Community College (2014)

Cosmosphere is an international science education center and space museum in Hutchinson, Kansas, United States, located on the northeast corner of Plum Street and 11th Avenue, next to the Hutchinson Community College. It was previously known as the Kansas Cosmosphere. The museum houses over 13,000 spaceflight artifacts—the largest combined collection of US and Russian spaceflight artifacts in the world, and is home to various space educational programs.

== Facilities ==
The Cosmosphere grew from a planetarium established on the Kansas State Fairgrounds in 1962. The 105,000-square-foot (9,800 m^{2}) facility houses the largest collection of Russian space artifacts outside of Moscow, and a collection of US space artifacts second only to the National Air and Space Museum in Washington, D.C.

The Cosmosphere has five venues: the Hall of Space Museum, the Justice Planetarium, the Carey Digital Dome Theater, Dr. Goddard's Lab (an explosive live science presentation on the history of rocketry) and CosmoKids, an interactive STEAM (Science, Technology, Engineering, Art, and Math) area. The Cosmosphere also hosts summer camps for all ages, and co-curricular applied STEAM education programs for field trips, groups, and scouts that meet Next Generation Science Standards and Common Core, focused on college and career readiness.

The Cosmosphere is the only Smithsonian affiliate museum in Kansas.

In 2012, the Carey Digital Dome Theater upgraded from IMAX to 4K digital projection system.

In 2015, the Justice Planetarium underwent a complete renovation, transitioning from an optical starball projection system to the Spitz Sci-Dome XD digital projection system.

In 2021, three of the museum's oldest galleries began renovations: the German Gallery, the Redstone and Sputnik Gallery, and the Kennedy Theater. These galleries opened during the late 1990s. They will be repainted, and their exhibits will receive new graphics and new sound.

=== Restoration and replication ===
The Cosmosphere's SpaceWorks division has restored flown U.S. spacecraft for museums and exhibits across the globe, including artifacts that are part of the collection of the Smithsonian Institution National Air and Space Museum. Two examples of this work are the Apollo 13 Command Module Odyssey, and the Liberty Bell 7 – both on display at the Cosmosphere. The Cosmosphere built roughly 80% of the artifacts and props for the movie Apollo 13 and of the replicated spacecraft hardware seen in Magnificent Desolation: Walking on the Moon 3D; and the TV mini-series From the Earth to the Moon.

== Collection ==
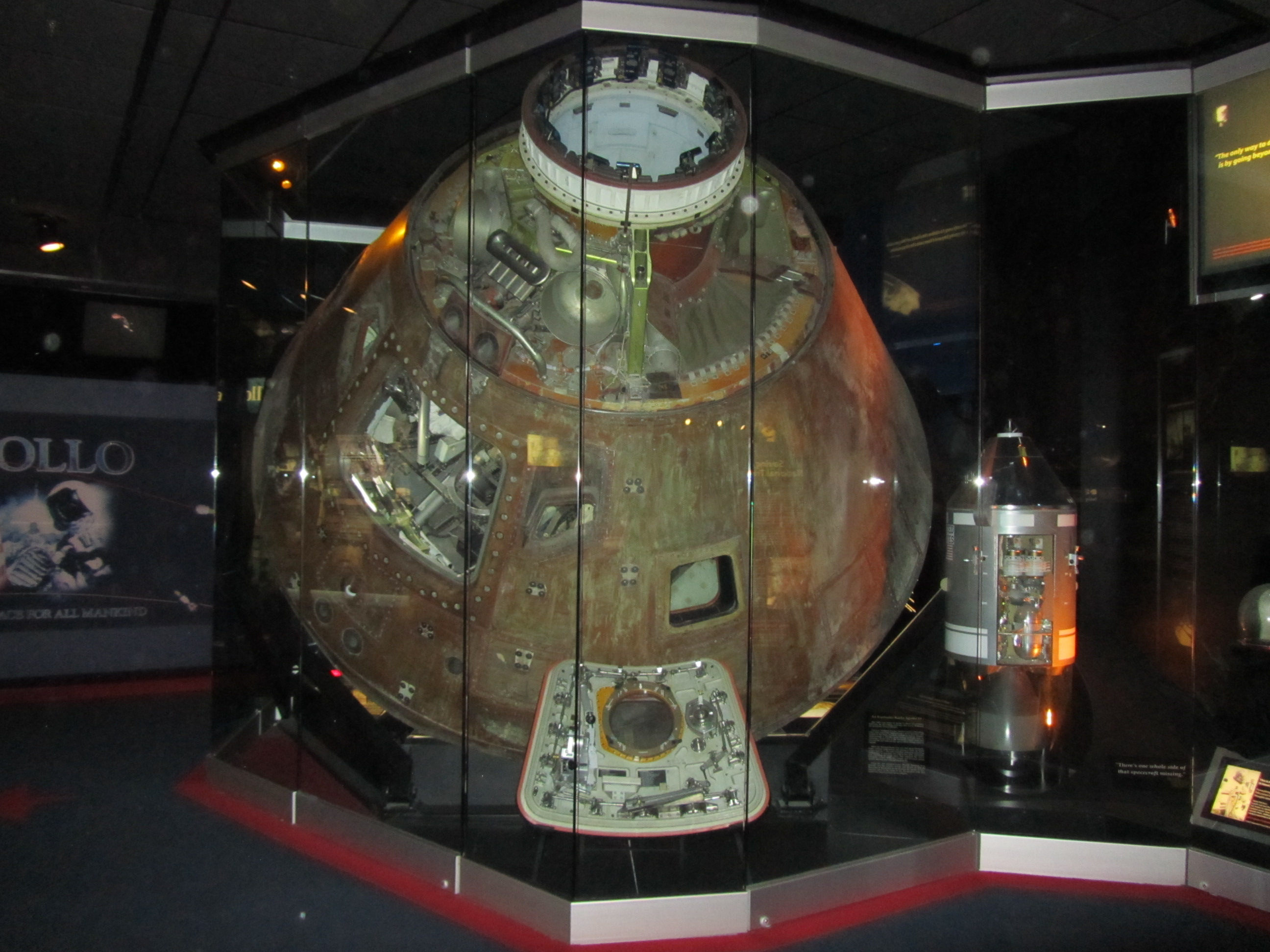
Apollo 13 command module on display (2010)

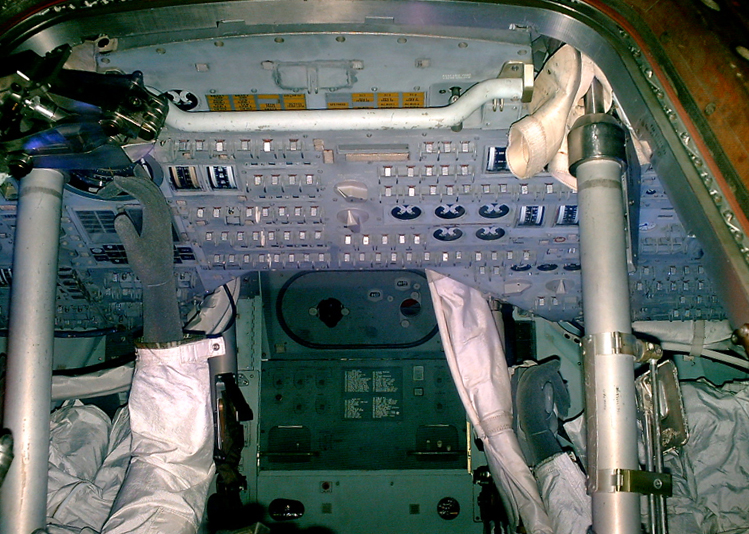
Interior view of the Apollo 13 capsule (2009)

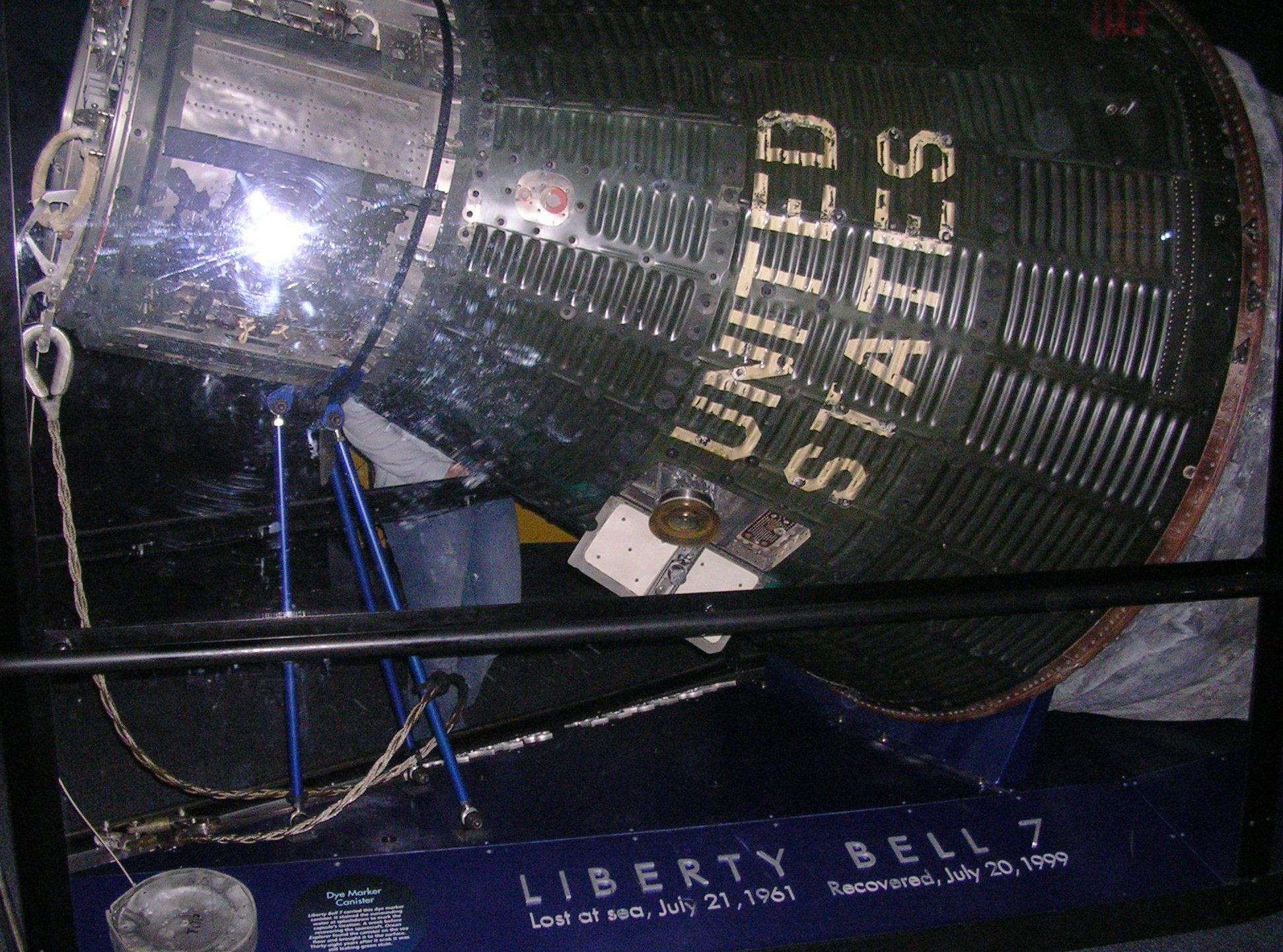
Liberty Bell 7 on display (2006)

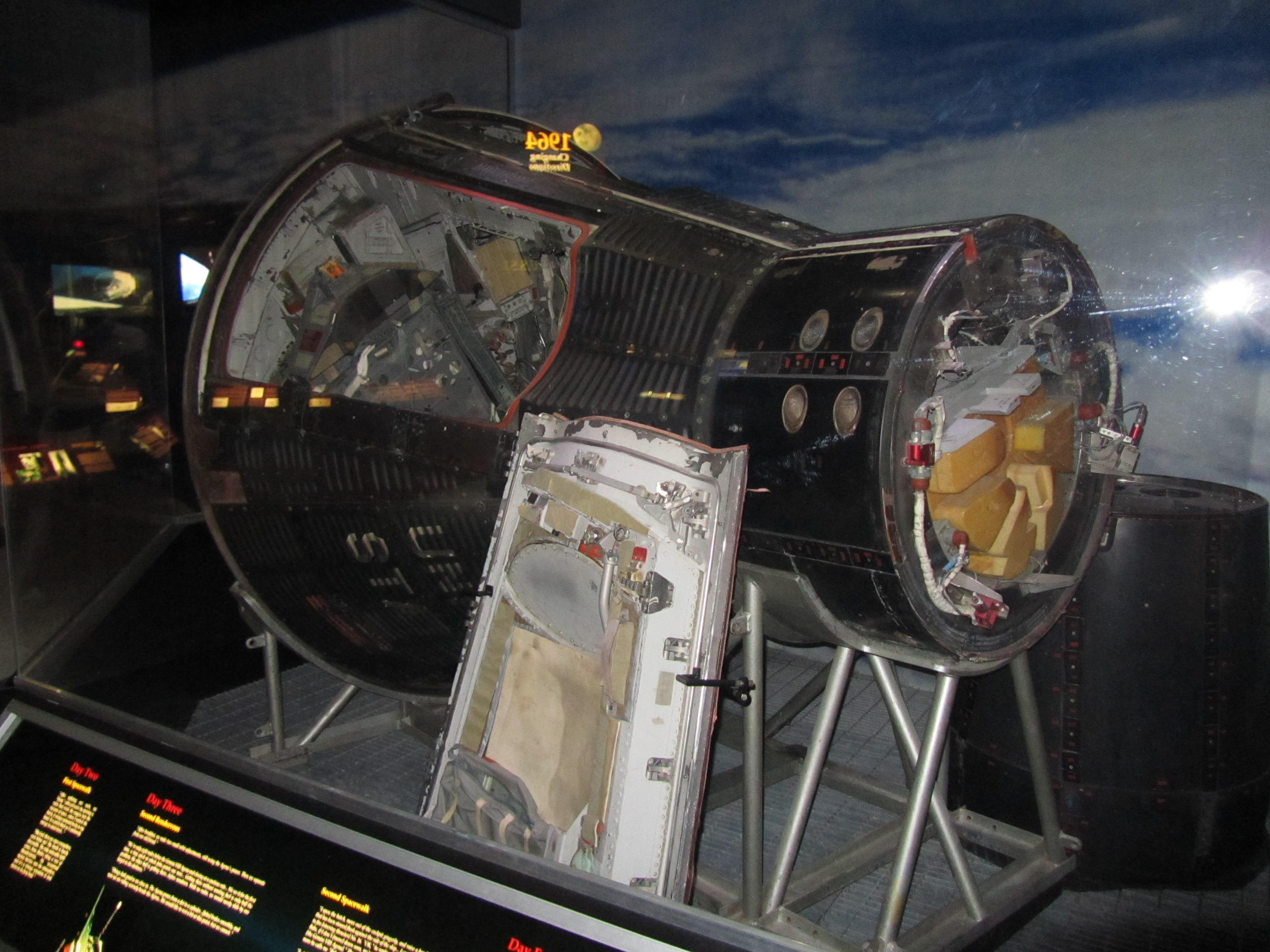
The Gemini 10 space capsule on display

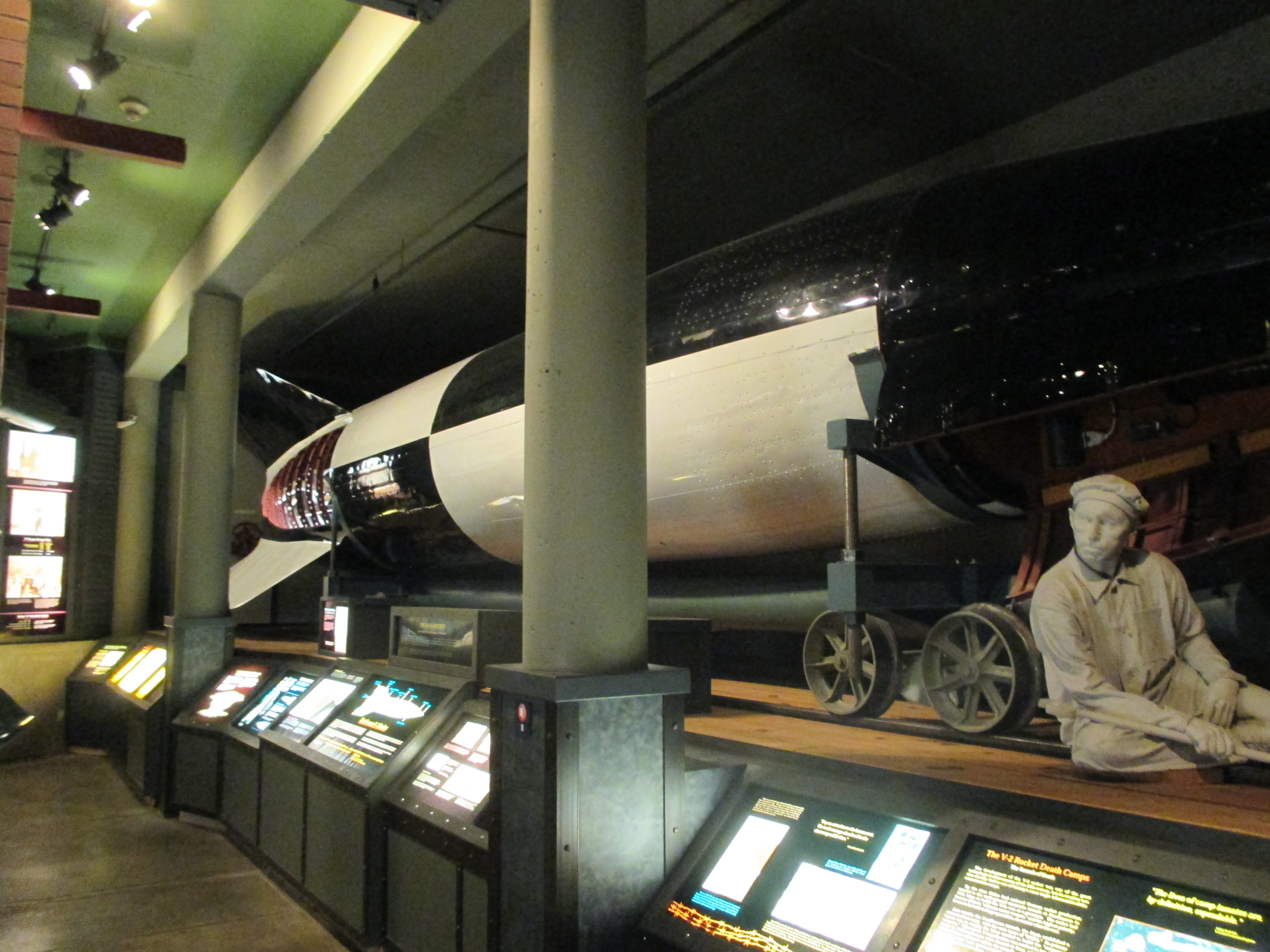
German V-2 rocket on display (2013)

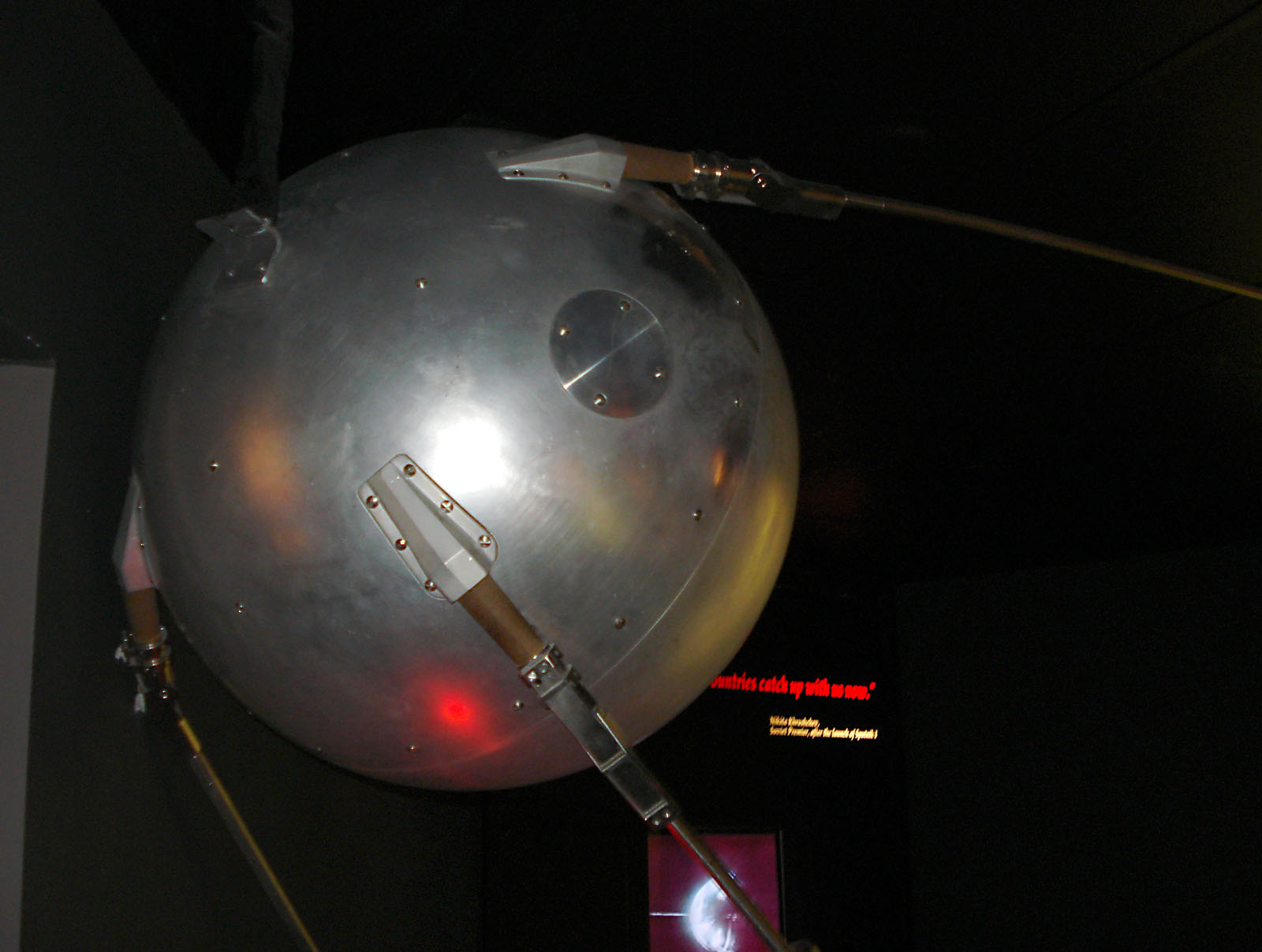
Flight-ready backup of Soviet Sputnik 1 on display (2008)

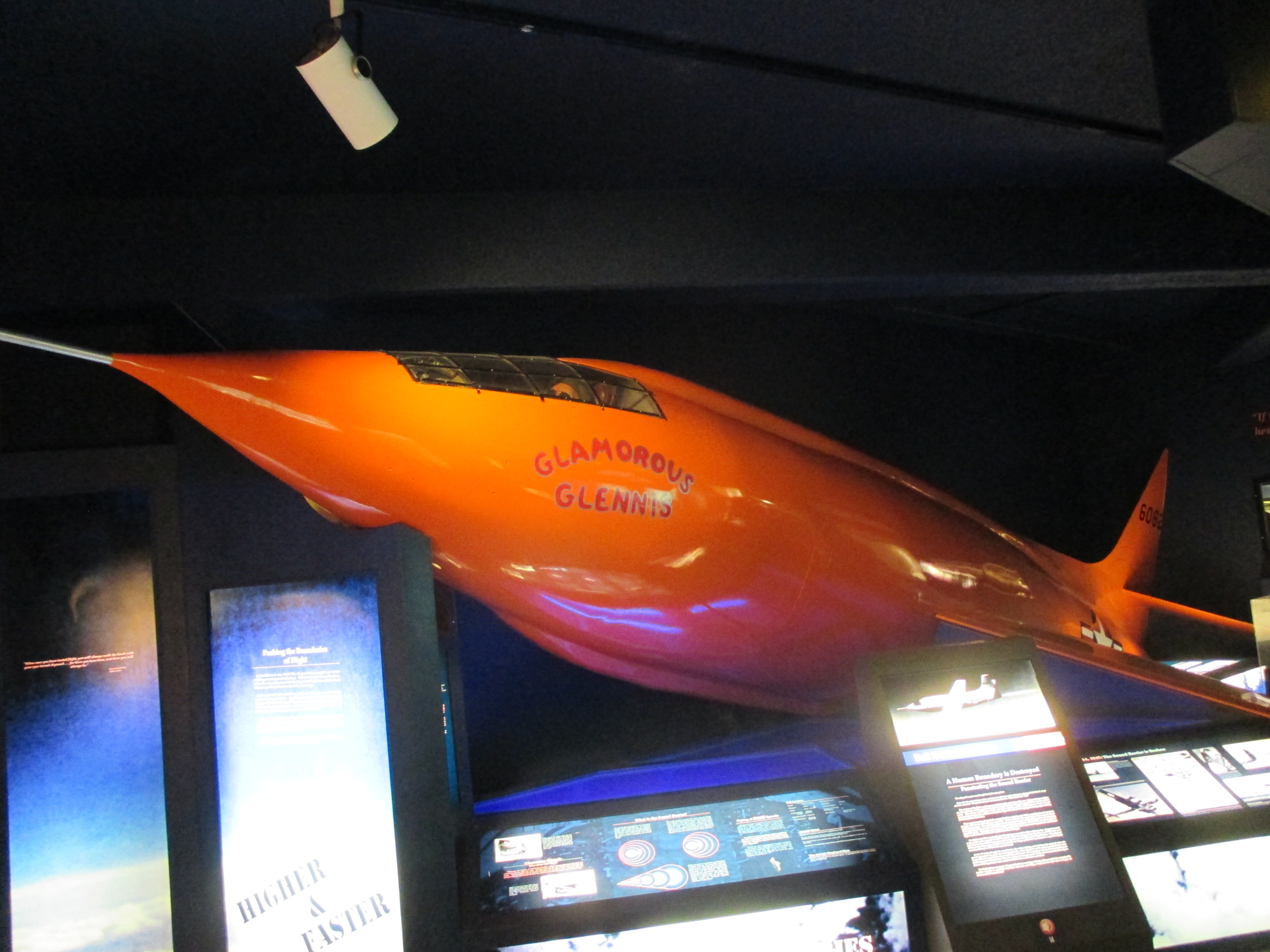
A replica of the Bell X-1 Glamorous Glennis, used in the 1983 film The Right Stuff

Flown items included in the Cosmosphere's collection are a Lockheed SR-71 Blackbird, the Liberty Bell 7 Mercury spacecraft, the Gemini 10 space capsule, and the Command Module Odyssey from Apollo 13. Additionally, authentic Redstone and Titan II launch vehicles used in the Mercury and Gemini programs flank the building's exterior. A prized item on display is a Moon rock from Apollo 11, the first crewed mission to land on the Moon.

Every artifact on display at the Cosmosphere is either an actual flown artifact, a "flight-ready backup" (identical to the item actually flown), an engineering model, or a historically accurate replica.

The Cosmosphere museum begins with the earliest experiments in rocketry during the World War II era, explores through the Space Race and Cold War, and continues through modern times with the Space Shuttle and International Space Station, as well as SpaceShipOne and commercial spaceflight.

Subset of notable items on display:

=== Germany ===
World War II era

- V-1 flying bomb missile (authentic, restored)
- V-2 rocket (authentic, restored)
- Walter HWK 109-509 rocket engine from a Messerschmitt Me 163 Komet

Cold War era

- Section of the Berlin Wall – last section removed (authentic)

=== Russia / Soviet Union / USSR ===
Early satellites

- Sputnik 1 (flight-ready backup)
- Sputnik 2 (engineering model)

Early space programs

- Vostok space capsule (competitor against Mercury program)
- Voskhod 2 space capsule (competitor against the Gemini program)

Space program joint venture with the United States

- Apollo–Soyuz Test Project Craft (full-scale replica)

Various space articles

- Prototype and flown Russian space suits
- RD-107 engine, used on the Soyuz rocket

=== United States ===
Winged aircraft

- Lockheed SR-71 Blackbird reconnaissance plane (flown)
- Northrop T-38 Talon supersonic jet trainer in NASA livery (flown)
- XLR11 and XLR99 rocket engines from the North American X-15 program (flown)
- Replica of the Bell X-1 Glamorous Glennis, used in the filming of The Right Stuff movie
- Engine from Bell X-1 Glamorous Glennis, pilot Chuck Yeager (flown)

Early satellites

- Explorer 1 satellite (replica)
- Vanguard 1 satellite (flight-ready backup)

Mercury space program

- Liberty Bell 7 Mercury spacecraft, recovered from the bottom of the Atlantic Ocean. It is the only spacecraft flown by NASA but owned by an entity other than NASA or the Smithsonian (owned by Cosmosphere).
- Mercury-Redstone Launch Vehicle rocket (authentic, standing vertical outdoors)

Gemini space program

- Gemini 10 space capsule (flown)
- Agena target vehicle docking collar (authentic)
- Titan II rocket used in the Gemini program (authentic, standing vertically outdoors)

Apollo space program

- Apollo 13 command module Odyssey (flown)
- Lunar Module ascent stage (engineering test article)
- Apollo–Soyuz Test Project 1-G trainer (authentic, used at Johnson Space Center)
- Lunar Roving Vehicle (full-scale replica)
- Lunar Module and surface experiment suite (full-scale replica)
- Apollo White Room (authentic)
- Moon rock collected during Apollo 11
- Multiple cameras and items carried on Apollo flights (flown)
- Rocketdyne F-1 engine components recovered from the ocean (flown), unused engine outdoors

Space Shuttle space program

- Full-scale replica of Space Shuttle Endeavour (left side only)
- Piece of tile from the Space Shuttle Columbia disaster (flown)

Various space articles

- Prototype and flown American space suits
- RL10, H-1, F-1, Merlin 1D rocket engines
- Surveyor program spacecraft (engineering model)
- Apollo-era Mission Control console from Mission Operations Control Room 2 (authentic)
- Atlas YLR89 booster engine and Redstone engine

- Mars Exploration Rover (full-scale replica)

== Controversy ==
In November 2003, the Cosmosphere released a statement indicating that a routine audit had revealed many missing items from the museum. Over a year later, in April 2005, former Cosmosphere director Max Ary was charged with stealing artifacts from the museum's collection and selling the pieces for personal profit. Some of the missing items included a nose cone, silk screens, boot covers, nuts and bolts, an Air Force One control panel, and a tape of the Apollo 15 landing which Ary sold for $2,200.

Additional charges involved the theft of dozens more artifacts from the Cosmosphere when he left in 2002 and false insurance claims made regarding the loss of an astronaut's Omega watch replica. Ary also failed to notify NASA of the watch's loss.

Ary went on trial in 2005. He testified that the artifacts he sold were from his private collection, which he had accumulated through undocumented trades and salvage of unwanted items. He also stated he had received numerous personal gifts from astronauts. Some of the items in question were supposedly brought with him from the Noble Planetarium in 1976 and incorporated into the Cosmosphere's permanent collection, and in many cases, ownership of artifacts could not be proved on Ary's behalf or the Cosmosphere's.

Ary was found guilty on 12 counts. On May 15, 2006, he was sentenced to three years in prison and ordered to pay restitution of $132,000. In 2008, he lost his appeal and began to serve his sentence in a federal prison in El Reno, Oklahoma on April 24, 2008. Ary has repeatedly proclaimed his innocence. He was released on good behavior in June 2010.

== See also ==
- Strataca, salt mine museum, in Hutchinson
- Combat Air Museum in Topeka
- Kansas Aviation Museum in Wichita
- Mid-America Air Museum in Liberal
- List of aerospace museums
- List of museums in Kansas
