= James Hart Wyld =

American engineer and rocketry scientist

- Born: September 10, 1912; New York City, New York, U.S.
- Died: December 1, 1953 (aged 41); Pompton Lakes, New Jersey, U.S.
- Education: Princeton University

James Hart Wyld (September 10, 1912 – December 1, 1953) was an American engineer and rocket scientist.

James Hart Wild was born on September 10, 1912, in New York City. Recognizing him as a child prodigy, his parents hired private tutors and sent him to the Harvey prep school in Hawthorne, New York, the Salisbury boarding school in Connecticut, and Princeton University He completed his B.S. in mechanical engineering at Princeton University in 1935.

Wyld's interest in rocketry began in 1934, with the reading of David Lasser's book, Conquest of Space, and reports from the Cleveland Rocket Society of early rocket engine experiments. He learned of the American Interplanetary Society (later renamed the American Rocket Society), and applied for membership in March 1935. The society's engines were based on early designs of the German rocket society Verein für Raumschiffahrt, but Wyld was unhappy with the German water-bath cooling scheme then used. He was more impressed with a 1933 regeneratively cooled engine developed by Harry Bull, of Syracuse, NY, and work by Eugene Saenger in Austria. With help from a couple professors, he began his own designs, calculations and experiments at Princeton.

In 1936 he developed the concept of a regeneratively cooled liquid rocket motor, which he named M-15. This uses a double-hulled rocket nozzle that allows the rocket fuel to circulate as a coolant. A version of this rocket motor was tested by the American Rocket Society on December 10, 1938, at New Rochelle, New York. The design produced a thrust of 90 pounds force (400 N) that lasted for 13 seconds, and the steel chamber and nozzle were successfully protected by the design. This cooling design became the basis of all modern liquid-propellant rocket motors.

In 1941 he helped to found Reaction Motors, Inc., serving as secretary and research director. This was the first commercial rocket company in the United States, and it was sponsored by the Navy. RMI's first Navy contract produced an engine capable of 1,000 pounds force (4,000 N) in 1942, and it was employed for JATO. Today, this engine is on display at the National Air and Space Museum. By 1943, his engines had achieved 3400 pounds thrust. His 6000C-4 engine, producing 6000 pounds of thrust was contained in the Bell X-1 rocket plane, which was the first crewed vehicle to break the sound barrier. The improved 8000C engine powered the MX-774 rocket, built by Karel Bossart.

After 1947, he worked on concepts for atomic rocket propulsion. He served on the Atomic Energy Commission in 1950.

Wyld died from a heart condition on December 1, 1953, at Pompton Lakes, New Jersey.

== Awards and honors ==
- Inductee into the International Space Hall of Fame at the New Mexico Museum of Space History, Alamogordo, New Mexico.
- The AIAA James H. Wyld Memorial Award was named for him.
- The Wyld crater on the Moon is named after him.

== Notes ==
More details at: http://www.nmspacemuseum.org/halloffame/detail.php?id=34
