= Douglas D-558-2 Skyrocket =

Experimental supersonic aircraft

D-558-2 Skyrocket
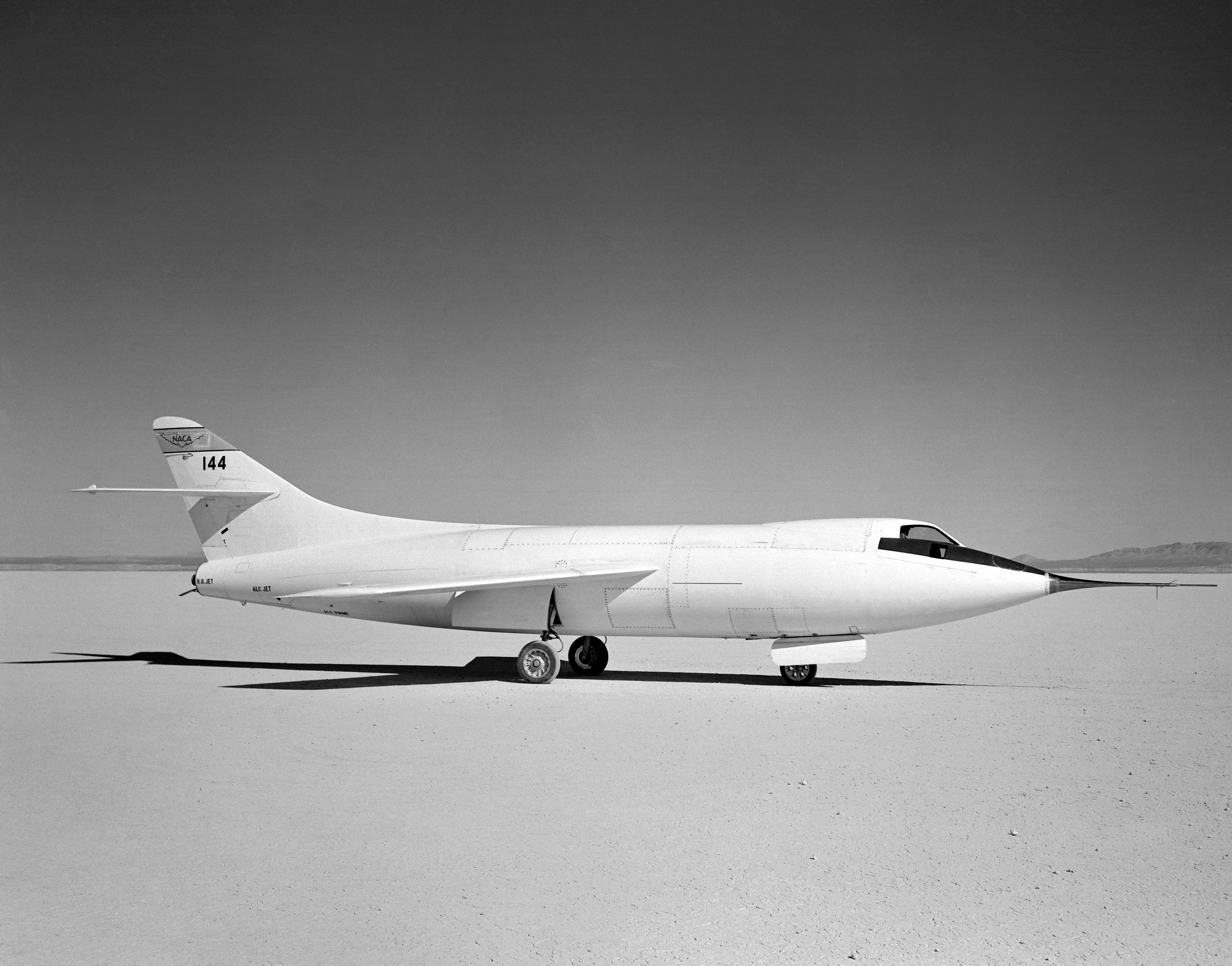
- Douglas Skyrocket D-558-2

General information
- Type: Experimental high-speed research aircraft
- Manufacturer: Douglas Aircraft Company
- Primary user: United States Navy
- Number built: 3

History
- First flight: 4 February 1948
- Developed from: Douglas D-558-1 Skystreak

The Douglas D-558-2 Skyrocket (or D-558-II) is a rocket and jet-powered research supersonic aircraft built by the Douglas Aircraft Company for the United States Navy. On 20 November 1953, shortly before the (17 December) 50th anniversary of powered flight, Scott Crossfield piloted the Skyrocket to Mach 2, or more than 1,290 mph (2076 km/h), the first time an aircraft had exceeded twice the speed of sound.

== Design and development ==
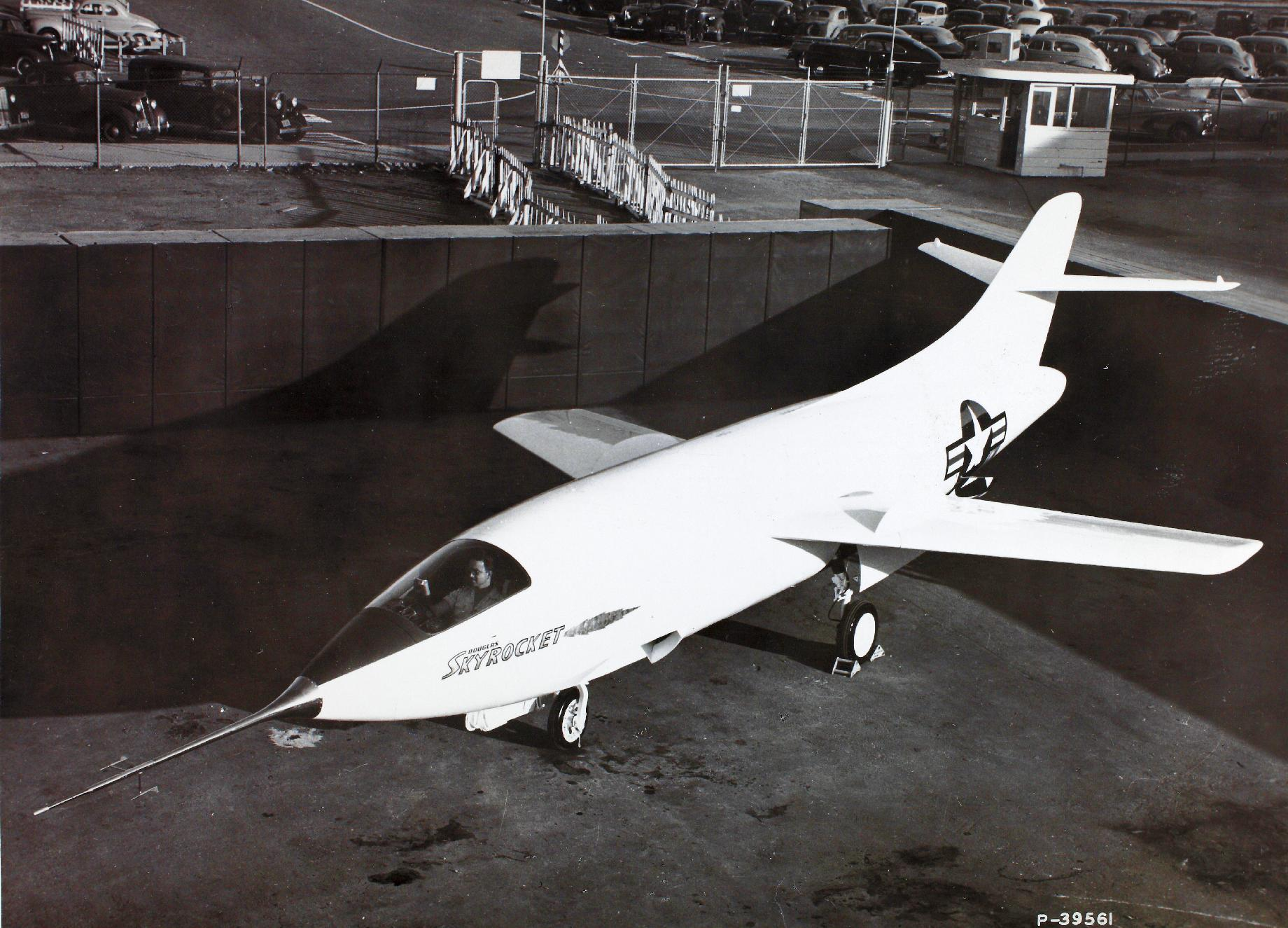
The D-558-2 undergoing tests

The "-2" in the aircraft's designation referred to the fact that the Skyrocket was the phase-two version of what had originally been conceived as a three-phase program. The phase-one aircraft, the D-558-1, was jet-powered and had straight wings. The third phase, which never came to fruition, would have involved constructing a mock-up of a combat-type aircraft embodying the results from the testing of the phase one and two aircraft. The eventual D-558-3 design, which was never built, was for a hypersonic aircraft similar to the North American X-15.

When it became obvious that the D558-1 fuselage could not be modified to accommodate both rocket and jet power, the D558-2 was conceived as an entirely different aircraft. The supply contract was changed on January 27, 1947 to drop the final three D558-1 aircraft and substitute three new D558-2 aircraft.

The Skyrocket featured wings with a 35-degree sweep and horizontal stabilizers with a 40-degree sweep. The wings and empennage were fabricated from aluminum and the large fuselage was primarily magnesium. The Skyrocket was powered by a Westinghouse J34-40 turbojet engine having 3,000 lbf (13 kN) thrust fed through side intakes in the forward fuselage. This engine was intended for takeoff, climb and landing. For high-speed flight, a four-chamber Reaction Motors LR8-RM-6 engine (the Navy designation for the Air Force's XLR11 used in the Bell X-1), was fitted. This engine was rated at 6,000 lbf (27 kN) static thrust at sea level. A total of 250 US gallons (950 L) of aviation fuel, 195 US gallons (740 L) of alcohol, and 180 US gallons (680 L) of liquid oxygen were carried in fuselage tanks.

The Skyrocket originally had a flush cockpit canopy, but visibility from the cockpit was poor, so it was re-configured with a raised cockpit with conventional angled windows. This resulted in a larger profile area at the front of the aircraft, which was balanced by an additional 14 inches (36 cm) of height added to the vertical stabilizer. Like its predecessor, the D558-1, the D558-2 was designed so that the forward fuselage, including the cockpit, could disconnect from the rest of the aircraft in an emergency. Once the forward fuselage had slowed down, the pilot could escape from the cockpit by parachute.

== Operational history ==
Douglas pilot John F. Martin made the first flight at Muroc Army Airfield (later renamed Edwards Air Force Base) in California on 4 February 1948 in an aircraft equipped only with the jet engine. The goals of the program were to investigate the characteristics of swept-wing aircraft at transonic and supersonic speeds with particular attention to pitch-up (un-commanded rotation of the nose of the aircraft upwards), a problem prevalent in high-speed service aircraft of that era, particularly at low speeds during takeoff and landing, and in tight turns.

The three aircraft gathered a great deal of data about pitch-up and the coupling of lateral (yaw) and longitudinal (pitch) motions; wing and tail loads, lift, drag and buffeting characteristics of swept-wing aircraft at transonic and supersonic speeds; and the effects of the rocket exhaust plume on lateral dynamic stability throughout the speed range. (Plume effects were a new experience for aircraft.) The number three aircraft also gathered information about the effects of external stores (bomb shapes, drop tanks) upon the aircraft's behavior in the transonic region (roughly 0.7 to 1.3 times the speed of sound). In correlation with data from other early transonic research aircraft such as the XF-92A, this information contributed to solutions to the pitch-up problem in swept-wing aircraft.

Its flight research was done at the NACA's Muroc Flight Test Unit in California, redesignated in 1949 the High-Speed Flight Research Station (HSFRS). The HSFRS became the High-Speed Flight Station in 1954 and was then known as the NASA Dryden Flight Research Center. In 2014 it was renamed Armstrong Flight Research Center in honor of Neil Armstrong.

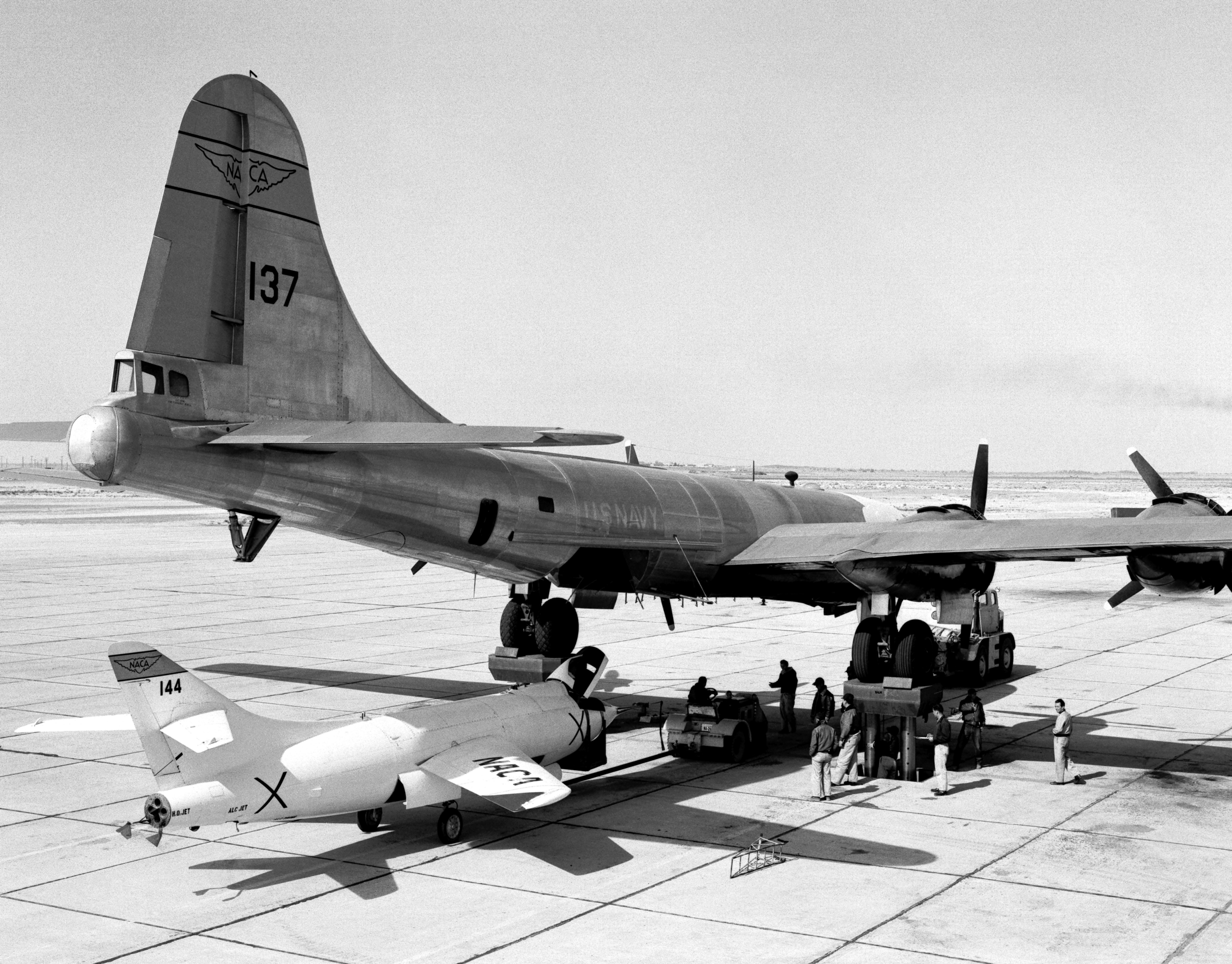
B-29 (P2B variant) on jacks to accept the Skyrocket

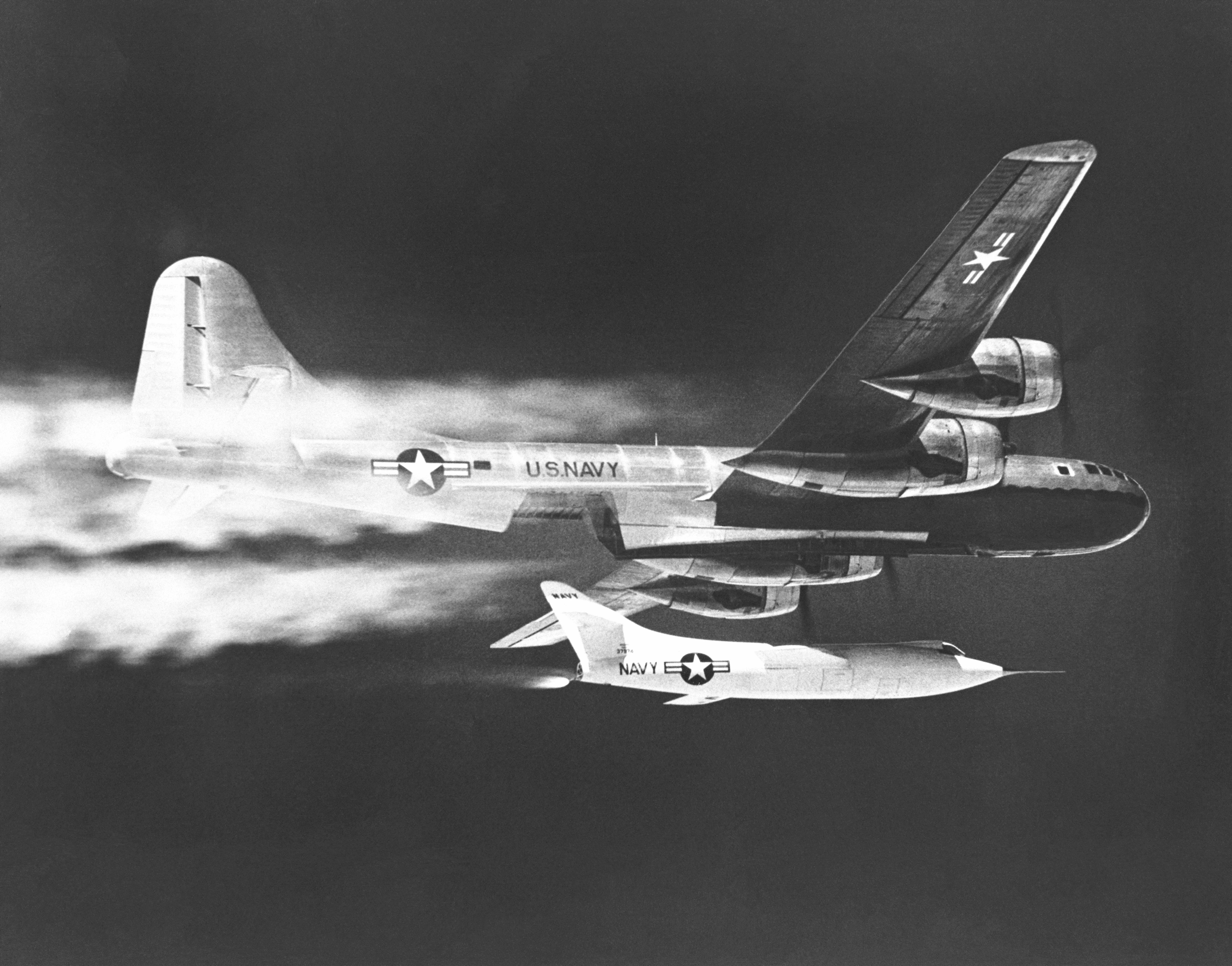
The Douglas Skyrocket was dropped from a Navy P2B patrol bomber

The three aircraft flew a total of 313 times – 123 by the number one aircraft (Bureau No. 37973—NACA 143), 103 by the second Skyrocket (Bureau No. 37974 – NACA 144), and 87 by aircraft number three (Bureau No. 37975 – NACA 145). Skyrocket 143 flew all but one of its missions as part of the Douglas contractor program to test the aircraft's performance.

NACA aircraft 143 was initially powered by the jet engine only but was later fitted with a rocket engine. In this configuration, it was tested by Douglas from 1949 to 1951. After Douglas' test program, it was delivered to NACA, who stored it until 1954. In 1954–55 the contractor modified it to an all-rocket air-launch capability with the jet engine removed. In this configuration, NACA research pilot John McKay flew the aircraft only once for familiarization on 17 September 1956. The 123 flights of NACA 143 served to validate wind-tunnel predictions of the aircraft's performance, except for the fact that the aircraft experienced less drag above Mach 0.85 than the wind tunnels had indicated.

NACA 144 also began its flight program with a turbojet powerplant. NACA pilots Robert A. Champine and John H. Griffith flew 21 times in this configuration to test airspeed calibrations and to research longitudinal and lateral stability and control. In the process, during August 1949 they encountered pitch-up problems, which NACA engineers recognized as serious because they could produce a limiting and dangerous restriction on flight performance. Hence, they determined to make a complete investigation of the problem.

In 1950, Douglas replaced the turbojet with an LR-8 rocket engine, and its pilot, Bill Bridgeman, flew the aircraft seven times up to a speed of Mach 1.88 (1.88 times the speed of sound) and an altitude of 79,494 ft (24,230 m), the latter an unofficial world's altitude record at the time, achieved on 15 August 1951. In the rocket configuration, the aircraft was attached beneath the bomb bay of a Navy P2B, a variant of the B-29 bomber. The P2B would fly to about 30,000 feet (9,100 m), then release the rocket plane. During Bridgeman's supersonic flights, he encountered a violent rolling motion known as lateral instability. The motion was less pronounced during the Mach 1.88 flight on 7 August 1951 than during a Mach 1.85 flight in June when he pushed over to a low angle of attack.

The NACA engineers studied the behavior of the aircraft before beginning their own flight research in the aircraft in September 1951. Over the next couple of years, NACA pilot Scott Crossfield flew the aircraft 20 times to gather data on longitudinal and lateral stability and control, wing and tail loads, and lift, drag, and buffeting characteristics at speeds up to Mach 1.878.

At that point, Marine Lt. Col. Marion Carl flew the aircraft to a new (unofficial) altitude record of 83,235 feet (25,370 m) on 21 August 1953, and to a maximum speed of Mach 1.728. The altitude record was not recognized by the Federation of Aeronautique Internationale, because at that time aircraft making record attempts had to take off on their own power.

Following Carl's completion of these flights for the Navy, NACA technicians at the High-Speed Flight Research Station (HSFRS) near Mojave, California, outfitted the LR-8 engine's combustion chambers with nozzle extensions to prevent the exhaust gas from affecting the rudders at supersonic speeds. This addition also increased the engine's thrust by 6.5 percent at Mach 1.7 and 70,000 feet (21,300 m).

Even before Marion Carl had flown the Skyrocket, HSFRS Chief Walter C. Williams had petitioned NACA headquarters unsuccessfully to fly the aircraft to Mach 2 to garner the research data at that speed. Finally, after Crossfield had secured the agreement of the Navy's Bureau of Aeronautics, NACA director Hugh L. Dryden relaxed the organization's usual practice of leaving record setting to others and consented to attempt a flight to Mach 2.

In addition to adding the nozzle extensions, the NACA flight team at the HSFRS chilled the fuel (alcohol) so more could be poured into the tank and waxed the fuselage to reduce drag. Project engineer Herman O. Ankenbruck drew up a plan to fly to about 72,000 feet (21,900 m) and push over into a slight dive. Crossfield made aviation history on 20 November 1953, when he flew to Mach 2.005, 1,291 miles per hour (2,078 km/h). It was the only Mach 2 flight the Skyrocket ever made.

Following this flight, Crossfield and NACA pilots Joseph A. Walker and John B. McKay flew the aircraft for such purposes as to gather data on pressure distribution, structural loads, and structural heating, with the last flight in the program occurring on 20 December 1956, when McKay obtained dynamic stability data and sound-pressure levels at transonic speeds and above.

Meanwhile, NACA 145 had completed 21 contractor flights by Douglas pilots Eugene F. May and William Bridgeman in November 1950. In this jet-and-rocket-propelled craft, Scott Crossfield and Walter Jones began the NACA's investigation of pitch-ups lasting from September 1951 well into the summer of 1953. They flew the Skyrocket with a variety of wing-fence, wing-slat and leading edge chord extension configurations, performing various maneuvers as well as straight-and-level flying at transonic speeds. While fences significantly aided recovery from pitch-up conditions, leading edge chord extensions did not, disproving wind-tunnel tests to the contrary. Slats (long, narrow auxiliary airfoils) in the fully open position eliminated pitch-up except in the speed range around Mach 0.8 to 0.85.

In June 1954, Crossfield began an investigation of the effects of external stores (bomb shapes and fuel tanks) upon the aircraft's transonic behavior. McKay and Stanley Butchart completed the NACA's investigation of this issue, with McKay flying the final mission on 28 August 1956.

Besides setting several records, the Skyrocket pilots had gathered important data and understanding about what would and would not work to provide stable, controlled flight of a swept-wing aircraft in the transonic and supersonic flight regimes. The data they gathered also helped to enable a better correlation of wind-tunnel test results with actual flight values, enhancing the abilities of designers to produce more capable aircraft for the armed services, especially those with swept wings. Moreover, data on such matters as stability and control from this and other early research aircraft aided in the design of the Century Series of fighter aircraft, all of which featured the movable horizontal stabilizers first employed on the X-1 and D-558 series.

== Variants ==
All three of the Skyrockets had 35-degree swept wings.

Until configured for air launch, NACA 143 featured a Westinghouse J-34-40 turbojet engine rated at 3,000 lbf (13 kN) static thrust. It carried 260 US gallons (980 L) of aviation gasoline and weighed 10,572 lb (4,795 kg) at takeoff.

NACA 144 (and NACA 143 after modification in 1955) was powered by an LR-8-RM-6 rocket engine rated at 6,000 pounds-force (27 kN) static thrust. Its propellants were 345 US gallons (1,310 L) of liquid oxygen and 378 US gallons (1,430 L) of diluted ethyl alcohol. In its launch configuration, it weighed 15,787 lb (7,161 kg).

NACA 145 had both an LR-8-RM-5 rocket engine rated at 6,000 lbf (27 kN) static thrust and featured a Westinghouse J-34-40 turbojet engine rated at 3,000 lbf (13 kN) static thrust. It carried 170 US gallons (640 L) of liquid oxygen, 192 US gallons (730 L) of diluted ethyl alcohol, and 260 US gallons (980 L) of aviation gasoline for a launch weight of 15,266 lb (6,925 kg).

=== Aircraft serial numbers ===
- D-558-2 Skyrocket
  - D-558-2 #1 – #37973 NACA-143, 123 flights
  - D-558-2 #2 – #37974 NACA-144, 103 flights
  - D-558-2 #3 – #37975 NACA-145, 87 flights

== Surviving aircraft ==
All three Skyrockets have been preserved. D-558-2 #1 Skyrocket is on display at the Planes of Fame Museum, Chino, California. The number two Skyrocket, the first aircraft to fly Mach 2, is on display at the National Air and Space Museum in Washington D.C. The third aircraft is displayed on a pylon in the grounds of Antelope Valley College, Lancaster, California.

== Specifications (D-558-2 Skyrocket) ==
(Configured with mixed propulsion)

Data from McDonnell Douglas aircraft since 1920 : Volume I,

General characteristics

- Crew: 1
- Length: 42 ft (13 m)
- Wingspan: 25 ft (7.6 m)
- Height: 12 ft 8 in (3.86 m)
- Wing area: 175 sq ft (16.3 m^{2})
- Airfoil: root: NACA 63-010; tip: NACA 63-012
- Launch weight turbojet only: 10,572 lb (4,795 kg)
- Launch weight mixed power: 15,266 lb (6,925 kg)
- Launch weight rocket only: 15,787 lb (7,161 kg)
- Fuel capacity:
- Turbojet fuel capacity: 250 US gal (210 imp gal; 950 L) Avgas
- Rocket fuel capacity: 195 US gal (162 imp gal; 740 L) Alcohol
- Rocket oxidiser capacity: 180 US gal (150 imp gal; 680 L) LOX
- Turbopump H_{2}O_{2} capacity: 11 US gal (9.2 imp gal; 42 L) High Test Hydrogen Peroxide (HTP)
- Powerplant: 1 × Westinghouse J34-WE-40 turbojet engine, 3,000 lbf (13 kN) thrust
- Powerplant: 1 × Reaction Motors XLR8-RM-5 4-chambered liquid-fuelled rocket engine, 6,000 lbf (27 kN) thrust

Performance

- Maximum speed: 585 mph (941 km/h, 508 kn) at 20,000 ft (6,100 m) on turbojet only

720 mph (630 kn; 1,160 km/h) at 40,000 ft (12,000 m) on mixed power with conventional take-off
1,250 mph (1,090 kn; 2,010 km/h) at 67,500 ft (20,600 m) on rocket power air-launched

- Stall speed: 160 mph (260 km/h, 140 kn)
- Rate of climb: 22,400 ft/min (114 m/s) mixed power

11,100 ft/min (3,400 m/min) rocket power only

- Wing loading: 60.4 lb/sq ft (295 kg/m^{2}) turbojet engine only

87.2 lb/sq ft (426 kg/m^{2}) mixed power
90.2 lb/sq ft (440 kg/m^{2}) rocket engine only

== See also ==
Related development

- Douglas D-558-1 Skystreak

Aircraft of comparable role, configuration, and era

- Bell X-2

Related lists

- List of experimental aircraft
- List of rocket aircraft
