= Viking (rocket) =

American sounding rockets, 1949 to 1955

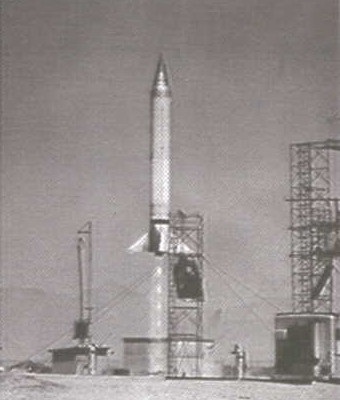
- Launch of Viking 10 on 7 May 1954
- Function: Research sounding rocket
- Manufacturer: Glenn L. Martin Company
- Country of origin: United States

Size
- Height: 15 m (49 ft); 13 m (43 ft)
- Diameter: 81 cm (32 in); 114 cm (45 in)
- Stages: 1

Launch history
- Status: Retired
- Launch sites: White Sands Missile Range, (Vikings 1–3 and 5–12); USS Norton Sound, near the Equator (Viking 4)
- Total launches: 12
- Success(es): 7
- Failure: 1
- Partial failure: 4
- First flight: 3 May 1949
- Last flight: 4 February 1955

First stage
- Powered by: Reaction Motors XLR10-RM-2
- Maximum thrust: 92.5 kN (20,800 lb_{f}) (sea level); 110.5 kN (24,800 lb_{f}) (vacuum)
- Specific impulse: 179.6 s (1.761 km/s)
- Burn time: 103 seconds
- Propellant: Ethyl alcohol and liquid oxygen

Viking was a series of twelve sounding rockets designed and built by the Glenn L. Martin Company under the direction of the US Naval Research Laboratory (NRL). Designed to supersede the German V-2 as a research vehicle, the Viking was the most advanced large, liquid-fueled rocket developed in the United States in the late 1940s, providing much engineering experience while returning valuable scientific data from the edge of space between 1949 and 1955.

After twelve flights, the Viking was adapted into the first stage for the Vanguard satellite launch vehicle, which launched America's second satellite into orbit in 1958.

== Origins ==
After World War II, the United States Army experimented with captured German V-2 rockets as part of the Hermes program. The number of V-2s available for all research was limited and Hermes was an Army project. The US Navy had the need to develop advanced missiles for both weapons and research purposes. The US Navy issued a contract 21 August 1946 to the Glenn L. Martin Company for a series of 10 large liquid-fueled rockets. The intent was to provide an independent US capability in rocketry, and to provide a vehicle better suited to scientific research. Originally dubbed "Neptune," it was renamed "Viking" in 1947 to avoid confusion with the Lockheed P-2 Neptune. The Viking was the most advanced large, liquid-fueled rocket being developed in the US at the time.

== Design ==
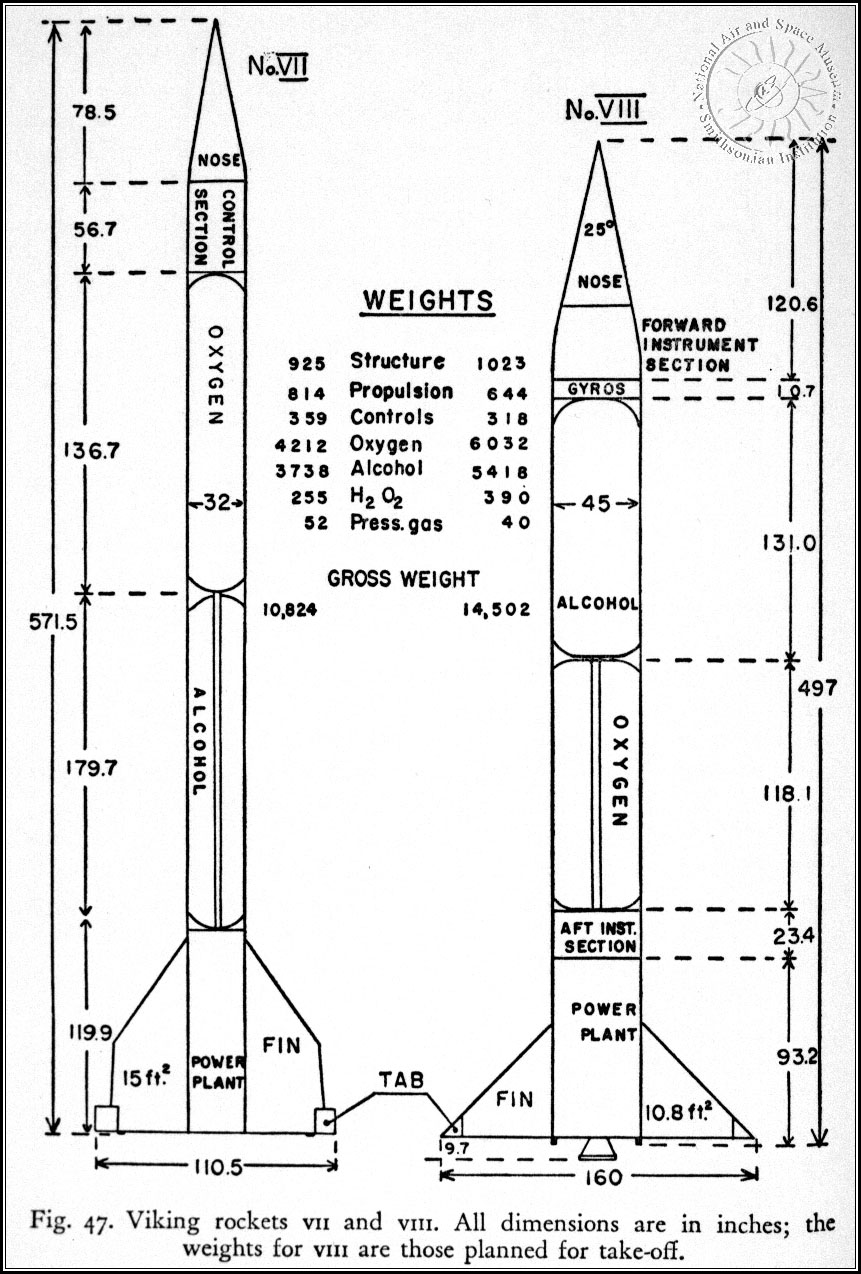
Diagram showing both Viking rocket variants, Vikings 1 to 7 (left) and 8 to 12 (right).

The Viking was roughly half the size, in terms of mass and power, of the V-2. Both were actively guided rockets, fueled with the same propellant (Ethyl alcohol and liquid oxygen), which were fed to a single large pump-fed engine by two turbine-driven pumps. The Reaction Motors XLR10-RM-2 engine was the largest liquid-fueled rocket engine developed in the United States up to that time, producing 20,800 lb (92.5 kN) of thrust at sea level, and 24,800 lb (110.5 kN) in a vacuum. The specific impulse was 179.6 s (1.761 km/s) and 214.5 s (2.104 km/s) respectively, with a mission time of 103 seconds. As was also the case for the V-2, hydrogen peroxide was converted to steam to drive the turbopump that fed fuel and oxidizer into the engine. XLR-10-RM-2 was regeneratively cooled.

Viking pioneered important innovations over the V-2. One of the most significant for rocketry was the use of a gimbaled thrust chamber which could be swiveled from side to side on two axes for pitch and yaw control, dispensing with the inefficient and somewhat fragile graphite vanes in the engine exhaust used by the V-2. The rotation of the engine on the gimbals was controlled by gyroscopic inertial reference; this type of guidance system was invented by Robert H. Goddard amongst others, who had partial success with it before World War II intervened. Roll control was by use of the turbopump exhaust to power reaction control system (RCS) jets on the fins. Compressed gas jets stabilized the vehicle after the main power cutoff. Similar devices are now extensively used in large, steerable rockets and in space vehicles. Another improvement was that initially the alcohol tank, and later the LOX tank also, were built integral with the outer skin, saving weight. The structure was also largely aluminum, as opposed to steel used in the V-2, thus reducing weight.

Vikings 1 through 7 were about 49 ft (15 m) long, slightly longer than the V-2, but with a straight cylindrical body only 32 inches (81 cm) in diameter, making the rocket quite slender. They had fairly large fins similar to those on the V-2. Vikings 8 through 14 were built with an enlarged airframe of improved design. The diameter was increased to 45 inches (114 cm), while the length was reduced to 43 ft (13 m), altering the missile's "pencil shape". The fins were made much smaller and triangular. The added diameter meant more fuel and more weight, but the "mass ratio", of fueled to empty mass, was improved to about 5:1, a record for the time.

== Flight history ==
=== First model RTV-N-12 (Vikings 1-7) ===
==== Viking 1 ====
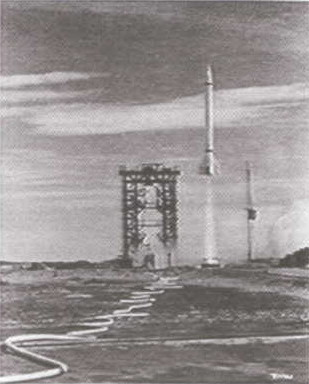
Launch of Viking 1

On 3 May 1949, after two static firings (11 March and 25 April), the first Viking rocket took off from White Sands Missile Range in New Mexico. Its engine fired for 55 seconds, ten seconds short of the hoped-for maximum of 65, but the rocket flew on course and reached an altitude of 51 mi (82 km)—deemed a good start to the program.

==== Viking 2 ====
Viking 2, launched four months later, also suffered from premature engine cutoff and only made it to 33 mi (53 km). Both had suffered from leaks in their turbines, the intense heat of the steam breaking the seal of the turbine casing. The solution was to weld the casing shut, there being no reason to access the turbine wheel again after a flight.

==== Viking 3 ====
The fix worked, and Viking 3, launched 9 February 1950 and incorporating an integrated (rather than discrete) oxygen tank, reached 50 mi (80 km) and could have gone higher. However, after 34 seconds of accurately guided flight, the rocket veered westward and threatened to leave the launch range. Range safety triggered charges in the rocket to separate the nose from the engine, and both tumbled to the ground, where they were recovered for analysis.

==== Viking 4 ====
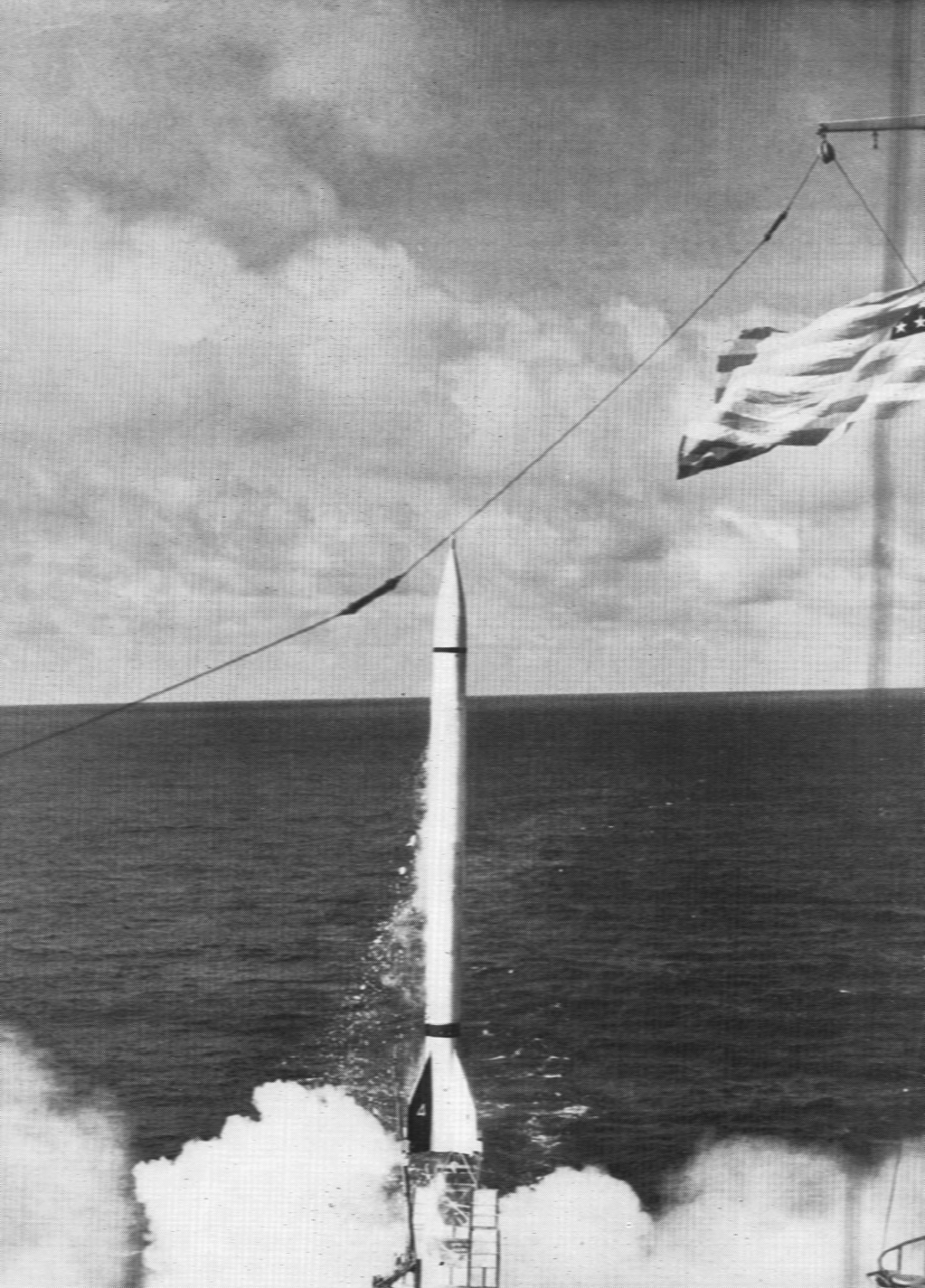
Launch of Viking 4

With successful tests of the engine and guidance systems conducted (though not on the same missions), Viking was deemed ready for its most ambitious test: shipboard launch from the deck of the USS Norton Sound. Viking 4 was identical to Viking 3, the first of the series not incorporate design changes to fix a problem on a previous Viking.} On 10 May 1950, from a site in the Pacific Ocean between Jarvis Island and Kiritimati, the fourth Viking became the only Viking rocket sounding rocket ever launched from a sea-going vessel. The flight was perfect, reaching 106.4 mi (171.2 km), more than double that reached by Vikings 1 and 3.

==== Viking 5 ====
Viking 5, launched 21 November 1950 carried a vast array of photomultiplier tubes, ionization chambers and Geiger counters, for the detection of radiation across a wide variety of energies and types. The rocket also carried two movie cameras to take high altitude film of the Earth all the way to its peak height of 108 miles (174 km) as well as Pirani gauges to measure air densities in the upper atmosphere.

==== Viking 6 ====
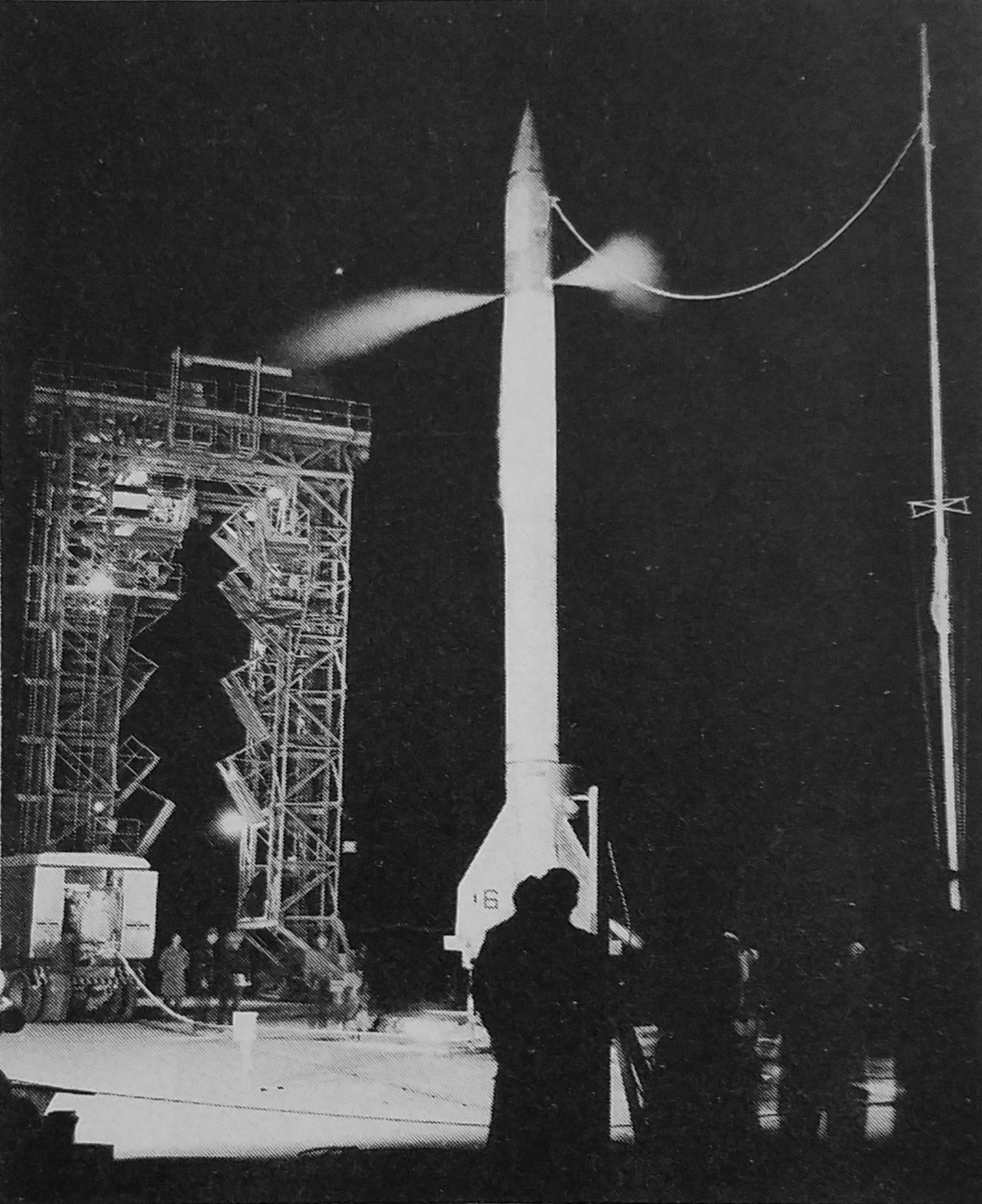
Viking 6 sounding rocket before 11 December 1950 launch

Viking 6, launched 11 December, carried a much lighter payload, but its experiments included a battery of custom built pressure gauges. The rocket underperformed, however, only reaching a maximum altitude of 40 miles (64 km).

==== Viking 7 ====
The first generation of Vikings reached its acme of performance with the flight of Viking 7, the sole Viking launch of 1951. Launched 7 August from White Sands, the rocket set a new world altitude record of 136 miles (219 km).

=== Second model RTV-N-12a (Vikings 8-12) ===
==== Viking 8 ====
In the late spring of 1952, the Naval Research Laboratory team under the management of Milton Rosen prepared to launch the first second-generation Viking (RTV-N-12a), Viking 8, from White Sands Missile Range in New Mexico. The new Viking design was nearly half as wide again as its precursor, affording the highest fuel-to-weight ratio of any rocket yet developed. The tail fins no longer supported the weight of the rocket, as had previously been the case. Now, the Viking rocket rested on the base of its fuselage. This allowed the tail fins to be made much lighter, allowing the rocket to carry a heavier tank without weighing more than the first Viking design.

On 6 June 1952, Viking 8 broke loose of its moorings during a static firing test. After it was allowed to fly for 55 seconds in the hope that it would clear the immediate area and thus pose no danger to ground crew, Nat Wagner, head of the "Cutoff group", delivered a command to the rocket to cease its thrust. 65 seconds later, the rocket crashed 4 or 5 miles (6 or 8 km) downrange to the southeast.

==== Viking 9 ====
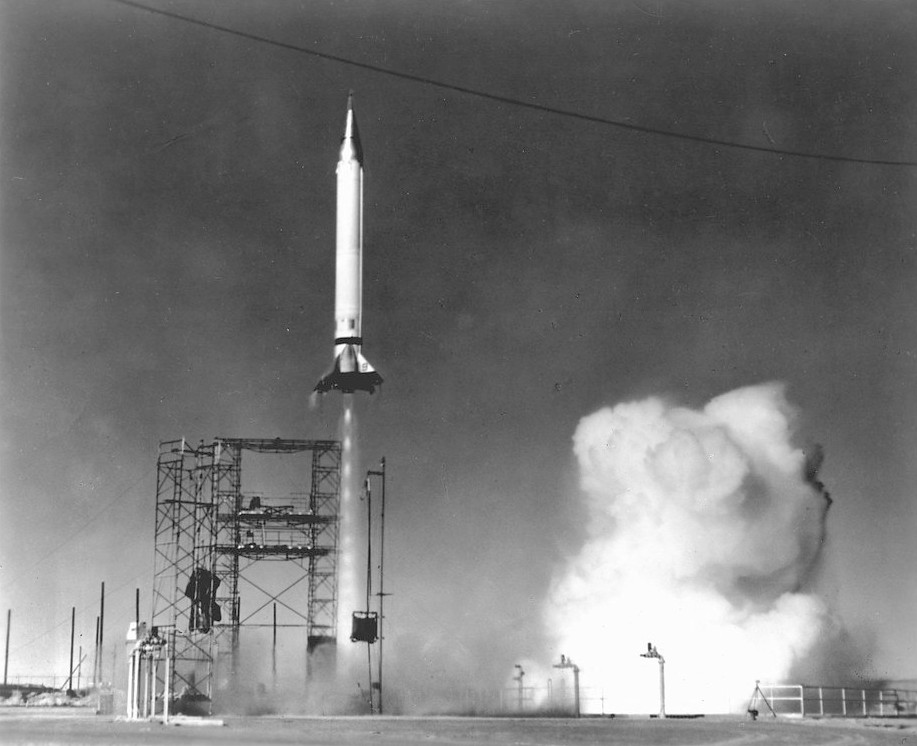
Viking 9 takes off 15 December 1952

With lessons learned from the Viking 8 failure, the successful 9 December static firing of Viking 9 was followed on 15 December by a successful launch from White Sands. The rocket reached an altitude of 135 miles (217 km), roughly the same as that of the first-generation Viking 7, launched in 1950. In addition to cameras that photographed the Earth during flight, Viking 9 carried a full suite of cosmic ray, ultraviolet, and X-ray detectors, including sixteen plates of emulsion gel for tracking the path of individual high energy particles. The experiment package was recovered intact after it had secured measurements high in the Earth's upper atmosphere.

==== Viking 10 ====
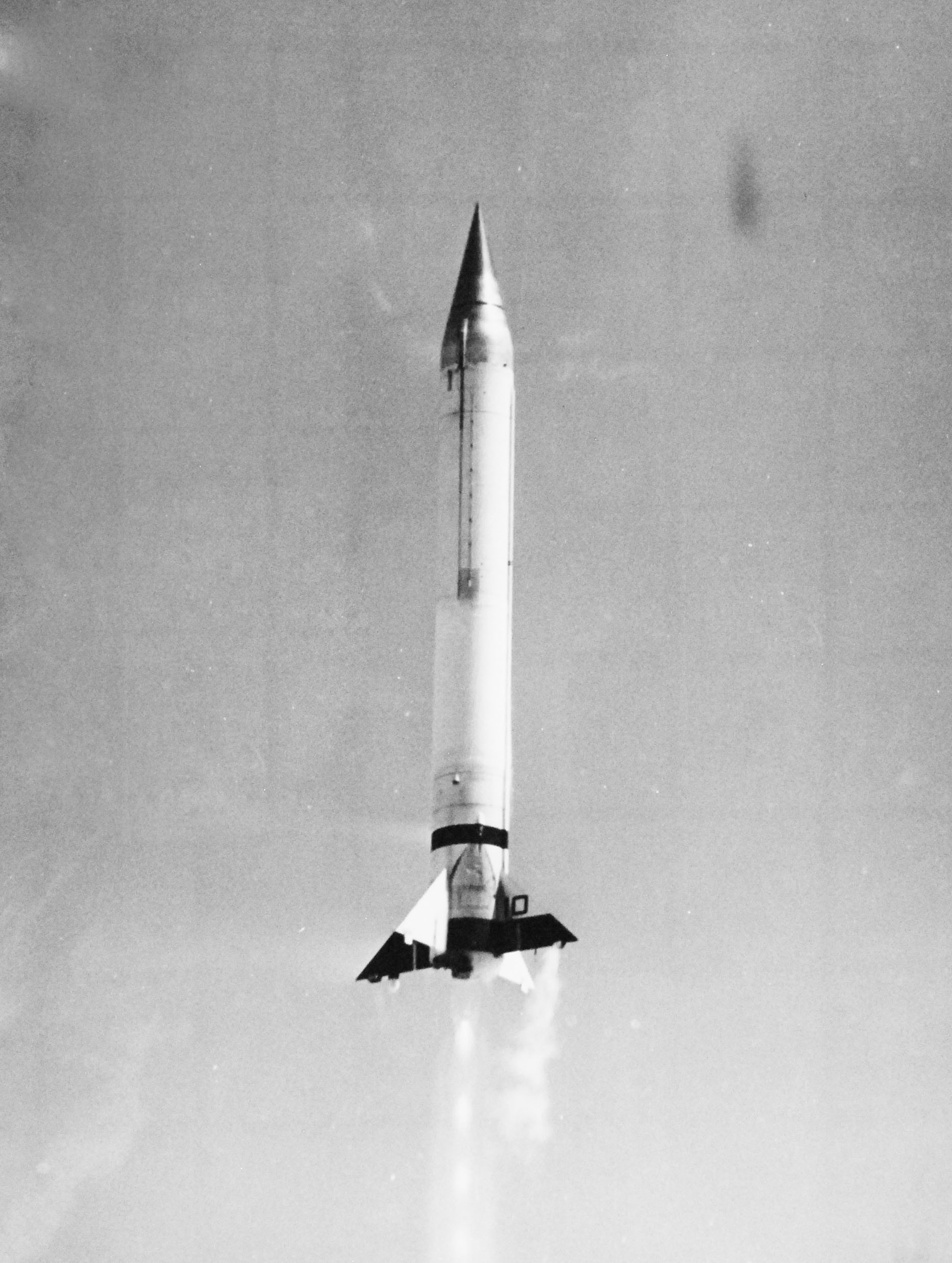
Viking 10 rocket being launched, May 7, 1954. Note, the original rocket exploded on first launch attempt on June 30, 1953 and was rebuilt for this launch.

On 25 May 1953, Viking 10, originally planned to be the last of the Vikings, arrived at White Sands Missile Range. A successful static firing on 18 June cleared the way for a 30 June launch date, a schedule that had been set months before, before the rocket had even left the Glenn L. Martin Company plant where it had been built. At the moment of liftoff, the tail of Viking 10 exploded, setting the rocket afire. Water was immediately flooded into the rocket's base to try to extinguish the fire, but flames continued to burn in the East Quadrant of the firing platform. Half an hour after launch, two of the launch team under manager Milton Rosen were dispatched to put out the fire to salvage what remained of the rocket.

Their efforts were successful but were then threatened by a slow leak in the propellant tank. The vacuum created by the escaping fuel was causing the tank to dimple, with the danger of implosion that would cause the rocket to collapse. Lieutenant Joseph Pitts, a member of the launch team, shot a rifle round into the tank, equalizing the pressure and saving the rocket. Three hours after the attempted launch, the last of the alcohol propellant had been drained from Viking 10. The launch team was able to salvage the instrument package of cameras, including X-ray detectors, cosmic ray emulsions, and a radio-frequency mass-spectrometer, valued at tens of thousands of dollars, although there was concern that the rocket was irreparable.

A thorough investigation of the explosion began in July, but a cause could not be determined conclusively. In a report presented in September, Milton Rosen noted that there had been no similar occurrence in more than 100 prior tests of the Viking motor. It was decided to rebuild Viking 10, and a program for closer monitoring of potential fail points was implemented for the next launch, scheduled for 1954. Ten months of salvage, testing, and troubleshooting followed the failed launch.

On 30 June 1953, the rebuilt rocket was once again ready for launch. A successful static firing took place at the end of April 1954, and launch was scheduled for 4 May. Control issues revealed in the static firing as well as gusty, sand-laden winds caused a delay of three days. At 10:00 am local time, Viking 10 blasted off from its pad at the White Sands Missile Range, reaching an altitude of 136 mi (219 km)—a tie with the highest altitude ever reached by a first-generation Viking (Viking 7 on 7 August 1951). Data was received from the rocket for all stages of the flight, and its scientific package, including an emulsion experiment, returned the first measurement of positive ion composition at high altitudes.

==== Viking 11 ====
Viking 11, which was ready for erection on 5 May, also had a successful static test and was ready for launch, 24 May 1954. Again, the countdown went without hold, and Viking 11, the heaviest rocket yet in the series, was launched at 10:00 AM. Forty seconds into the flight, several puffs of smoke issued from the vehicle, but these accidental excitations of the rocket's roll jets did no harm. Viking 11 ultimately reached 158 mi (254 km) in altitude, a record for the series, taking the highest altitude photographs of the Earth to date. Viking 11 carried a successful emulsions experiment, measuring cosmic rays at high altitudes.

==== Viking 12 ====
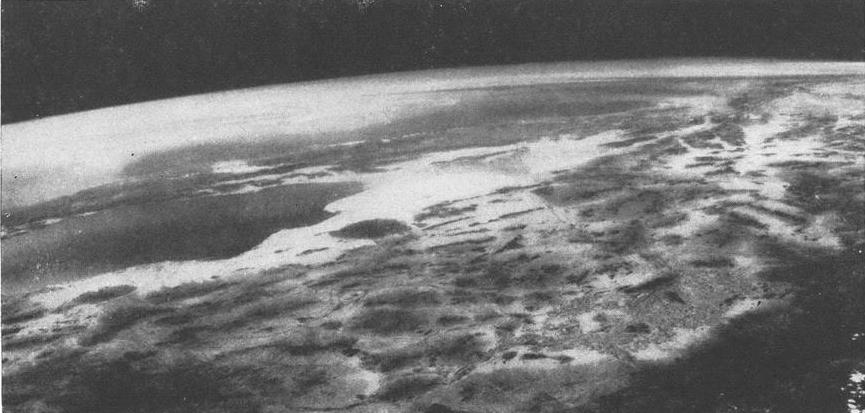
Viking 12 infrared photo of the Earth taken 4 February 1955

The final Viking flight was that of Viking 12, launched 4 February 1955. Reaching an altitude of 143.5 mi (230.9 km), the rocket's K-25 camera took an infrared picture of the Southwestern United States, from the Pacific coast to Phoenix, just after reaching its apogee.

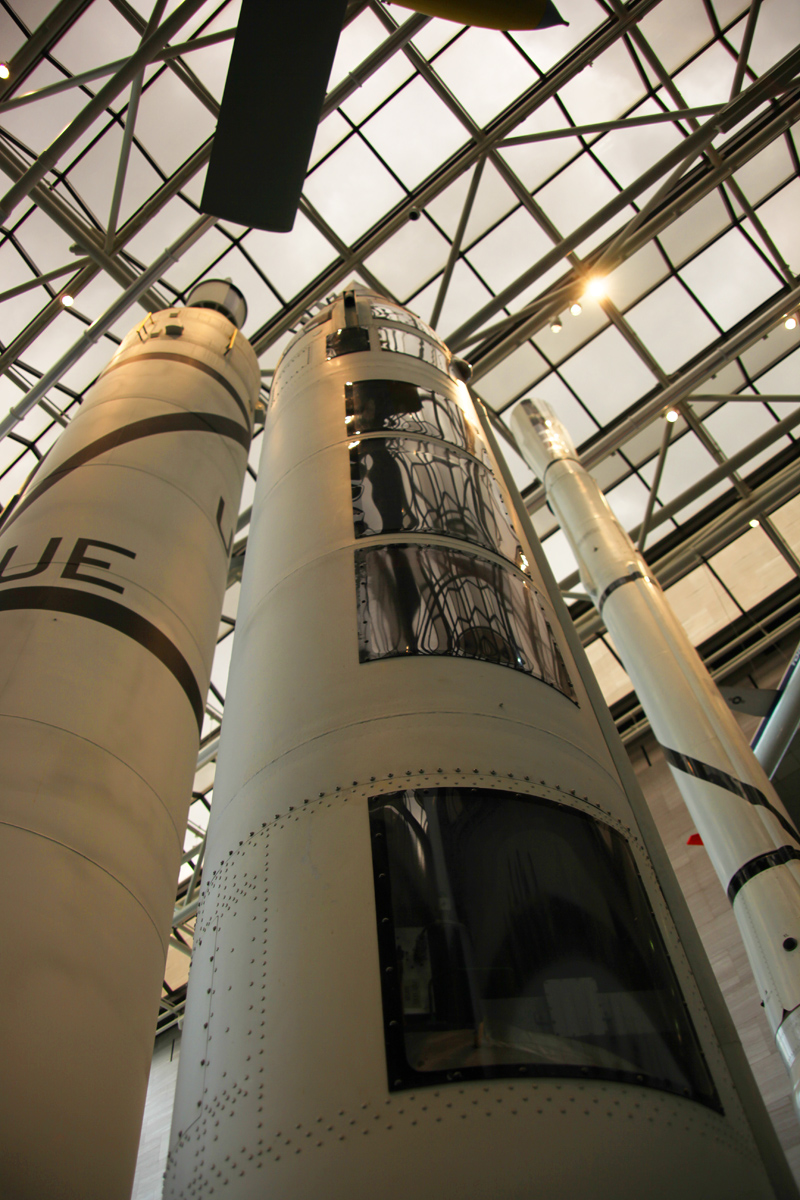
Viking 12 reconstruction at the Smithsonian

Parts of Viking 12 were recovered and, along with parts built from the original blueprints, were used to create a full-size cutaway reconstruction of the rocket. This vehicle was donated by the Martin Marietta Corp in 1976 to the National Air and Space Museum, where it is on display.

== Viking into Vanguard ==
The Viking series returned a bonanza of scientific information measuring temperature, pressure, density, composition and winds in the upper atmosphere and electron density in the ionosphere, and recording the ultraviolet spectra of the Sun, The success of the program, at a cost of under $6 million, suggested that, with a more powerful engine and the addition of upper stages, the Viking rocket could be made a vehicle capable of launching an Earth satellite.

In October 1952, the General Assembly of the International Council of Scientific Unions (ICSU) adopted a proposal to undertake simultaneous observations of geophysical phenomena over the entire surface of the Earth. The International Geophysical Year (IGY), set for 1957–58, would involve the efforts of a multitude of nations in such farflung regions as the Arctic and Antarctica. In January 1955, Radio Moscow announced that the Soviet Union might be expected to launch a satellite in the near future. This announcement galvanized American space efforts; in the same month, the National Academy of Sciences' IGY committee established a Technical Panel on Rocketry to evaluate plans to orbit an American satellite.

On 26 May 1955, the US National Security Council also endorsed a satellite program. On 8 June, United States Secretary of Defense Charles Wilson directed Assistant Secretary Donald A. Quarles to coordinate the implementation of a satellite program, with the United States Department of Defense providing the rocket and launch facilities, and the civilian IGY National Committee producing the satellite and its experimental package, the National Science Foundation being intermediary between the two agencies. A committee, under the chairmanship of Homer J. Stewart of Jet Propulsion Laboratory, was developed to manage the project to weigh and choose between the available satellite orbiting options. They were Project Orbiter, an Army plan to use a slightly modified Redstone (a 200-mile (320 km) range surface-to-surface missile developed the prior year) combined with upper stages to put a satellite into orbit, which could be tracked optically., and the NRL plan to develop an orbital capability for the Viking (Project Vanguard).

On 28 July, confident that a satellite could be lofted during the IGY, President Dwight D. Eisenhower's press secretary, James Hagerty, announced that a satellite would officially be among the United States' contributions to the IGY. The Soviets responded four days later with their own announcement of a planned IGY satellite launch.

By 9 September, over Stewart's objections, the Stewart Committee had chosen Vanguard over Orbiter, citing the Navy's impressive planned Minitrack communications technology and network as well as both the civilian nature and the greater growth potential of the Viking/Vanguard rocket. The contract authorizing the construction of two more Viking rockets to continue upper atmospheric research was expanded to include development of the Vanguard rockets. The Viking was thus incorporated as the first stage of NRL's three-stage Project Vanguard vehicle which launched the second US satellite in 1958. Vikings 13 and 14, substantially similar to Vikings 8 through 12, were used as suborbital test vehicles (Vanguard TV-0 and Vanguard TV-1) before the first Vanguard vehicle, Vanguard TV-2, became available for test in the fall of 1957.

== Table of flights ==
Viking flights
Viking #	Launch date	Altitude	Remarks
1	3 May 1949	50 mi (80 km)	Prolonged and trying period of ground firing tests. Altitude limited by premature engine cut-off traced to steam leakage from the turbine casing.
2	6 September 1949	32 mi (51 km)	Early engine cut-off for same reason as Viking 1. Solved by welding rather than bolting turbine casing halves of subsequent engines.
3	9 February 1950	50 mi (80 km)	Suffered from instability in a redesigned guidance system; had to be cut off by ground command when it threatened to fly outside launch range.
4	11 May 1950	105 mi (169 km)	Launched from the deck of the USS Norton Sound near the Equator, almost the maximum possible for the payload flown, in a nearly perfect flight. Guidance system had been reverted to that of Viking 1 and 2.
5	21 November 1950	108 mi (174 km)	Engine thrust was about 5% low, slightly reducing maximum altitude.
6	11 December 1950	40 mi (64 km)	Suffered catastrophic failure of the stabilizing fins late in powered flight causing loss of attitude control, which created very large drag and reduced maximum altitude.
7	7 August 1951	136 mi (219 km)	Beat the old V-2 record for a single-stage rocket. Highest and last flight of the original airframe design.
8	6 June 1952	4 mi (6 km)	First rocket of improved airframe design; lost when it broke loose during static testing, flying to just 4 mi (6 km) before ground commanded cut-off.
9	15 December 1952	135 mi (217 km)	First successful flight of the improved airframe design.
10	7 May 1954	136 mi (219 km)	Engine exploded on first launch attempt, 30 June 1953. Rocket was rebuilt and flown successfully.
11	24 May 1954	158 mi (254 km)	Set altitude record for a Western single-stage rocket up to that time.
12	4 February 1955	144 mi (232 km)	Re-entry vehicle test, photography, and atmospheric research.
13	4 December 1956	131 mi (211 km)	Vanguard TV-0 - Telemetry and launch complex test.
14	1 May 1957	126 mi (202 km)	Vanguard TV-1 - Carried a prototype Vanguard 3rd stage.

Vikings 1–12, excepting Viking 4, were flown from White Sands Missile Range, New Mexico. Vikings 13 and 14 were launched from Cape Canaveral.

== See also ==
- Vanguard rocket
- Milton Rosen
