= Reaction Motors XLR11 =

Rocket engine

XLR11
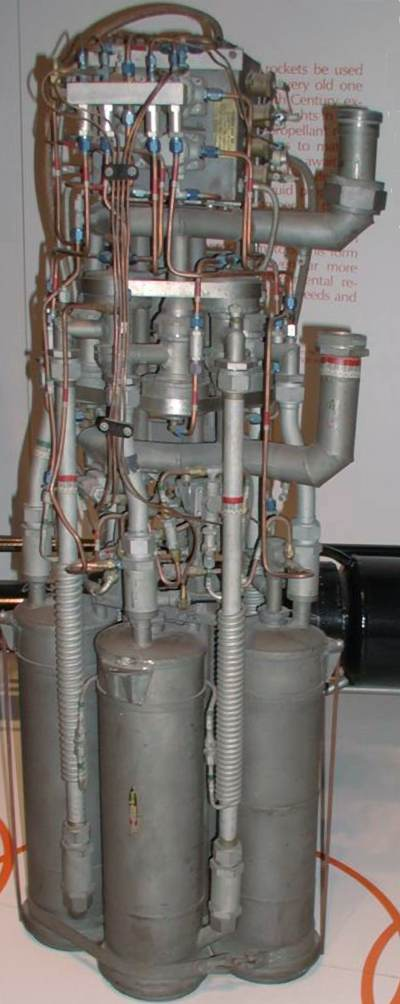
- XLR11 rocket engine on display at the National Air and Space Museum
- Country of origin: United States
- Date: 1947–1960
- Manufacturer: Reaction Motors Inc.
- Successor: XLR-99

Liquid-fuel engine
- Propellant: LOX / Ethyl alcohol

Performance
- Thrust: 6,000 lbf (27 kN)

Dimensions
- Dry mass: 210 lb (95 kg)

The XLR11, company designation RMI 6000C4, was the first liquid-propellant rocket engine developed in the United States for use in aircraft. It was designed and built by Reaction Motors Inc., and used ethyl alcohol and liquid oxygen as propellants to generate a maximum thrust of 6,000 lbf (27 kN). Each of the four combustion chambers produced 1,500 lbf (6.7 kN) of thrust. The engine was not throttleable but each chamber could be turned on and off individually.

== Development ==
Development of the engine began in 1943. Reaction Motors called the engine "Black Betsy", though informally it was referred to as "The Belching Black Bastard". Its first official designation was the 6000C4, and it was later given the military designation XLR11.

== Operational history ==
The XLR11-RM-5 engine was first used in the Bell X-1. On October 14, 1947, the X-1 became the first aircraft to fly faster than the speed of sound (Mach 1). The XLR11-RM-5 was also used in the X-1A and X-1B, and as a booster engine in the U.S. Navy's D-558-2 Douglas Skyrocket turbojet (where it was designated the XLR8-RM-5).

In 1959 and 1960, while development of a more powerful engine was still under way, a pair of XLR11-RM-13's were used as an interim power plant for the initial flights of the X-15 research aircraft. These engines were boosted to 2,000 lbf (8.9 kN) of thrust per chamber for a total of 16,000 lbf (71 kN). In comparison, the thrust of the X-15's XLR99 engine could be varied from 15,000–57,000 lbf (67–254 kN). After 24 powered flights, the XLR11 engines were replaced by the new XLR99 engine in November 1960.

The XLR11-RM-13 was also used in the Dryden lifting bodies, and as a booster engine in the Republic XF-91 Thunderceptor turbojet.

== Variants ==
RMI 6000C4
Company designation of the LR11 family.
XLR8-RM-5
XLR8-RM-6
(RMI A6000C4-2)
XLR11-RM-5
XLR11-RM-13

== Specifications (XLR11-RM-5) ==
Data from:Aircraft engines of the World 1959/60

=== General characteristics ===
- Type: quadruple chamber liquid propellant rocket engine
- Length: 143.5 centimetres (56.5 in) to 208 centimetres (82 in) models
- Diameter: 46 centimetres (18 in)
- Dry weight: 95.1 kilograms (210 lb)
- Propellant capacity: 600 gallons for 2.5 minutes
- Fuel: ethanol (C_{2}H_{5}OH / EtOH)
- Oxidiser: liquid oxygen (LO_{2} / LOX)

=== Components ===
- Pumps: Early model pressurized gas feed system and later versions integrated turbopumps

=== Performance ===
- Thrust: 8,000 lbf (36,000 N)
- Burn time:
- Thrust-to-weight ratio: 0.49 on a Bell X-1
- Thrust specific fuel consumption: 6 to 20 lb/(lbf·hr) on Bell X-1

== See also ==
- Bell X-1
- North American X-15
- Northrop M2-F2
- Northrop M2-F3
- Northrop HL-10
- Martin Marietta X-24A
- Martin Marietta X-24B
