= Reaction Motors =

Defunct American rocket engine company

Reaction Motors, Inc. (RMI)
- Type: Private company
- Industry: Rocket technology
- Founded: 1938
- Defunct: April 17, 1958
- Fate: Merged into Thiokol as Reaction Motors Division, disbanded 1972
- Area served: United States
- Key people: Lovell Lawrence Jr, George Edward Pendray, James Hart Wyld

Reaction Motors, Inc. (RMI) was an early American maker of liquid-fueled rocket engines, located in New Jersey. RMI engines with 6,000 lbf (27 kN) thrust powered the Bell X-1 rocket aircraft that first broke the sound barrier in 1947, and later aircraft such the X-1A, X-1E, and the Douglas D-558-2 Skyrocket. A 20,000 lbf (89 kN) thrust RMI engine also powered the Viking research rocket, the first large liquid-fueled US high-altitude rocket. RMI was merged with Thiokol in 1958, where it produced the XLR-99 engine that powered the X-15 rocket aircraft.

== History ==
=== Formation and the sound barrier ===
Reaction Motors, Inc. began operation as early as 1930 through the work of then American Interplanetary Society members Lovell Lawrence, George Edward Pendray, Hugh Pierce, and engineer John Shesta. This group quickly moved from science fiction discussions to practical rocketry.

Pendray contributed heavily to their early designs using knowledge acquired from a trip to Berlin in 1931. In 1938, Princeton University student James Hart Wyld tested a two-pound rocket engine which provided 90 pounds of thrust; this would become the basis for the group's work over the next two decades.

Though test flights are recorded from 1933 forward, the group would rename themselves the American Rocket Society and continue experimentation in the relatively populous area of Staten Island until incorporating Reaction Motors, Inc. under Lovell Lawrence in 1938 in pursuit of a war-time contract from the United States Navy.

In 1938 and prior to incorporation, the group successfully designed and perfected the world's first workable regenerative cooling rocket engine, technology which would for the first time make liquid-fueled rocket engines capable of burning for long enough periods to be practical. All future liquid-fueled rockets would build off this technology. They tested this rocket engine in Pompton Lakes, New Jersey, not far from the laboratory they built it in. Reaction Motors, Inc. (RMI) was incorporated in December 1941. It was the first commercial rocket engine company in the United States. With Lawrence as president and Wyld, Pierce, and Shesta as company officers, Reaction Motors, Inc. (RMI) received its first naval contract in 1942. Operating on a start-up budget of $5,000, the company first used a bicycle shop in Oakland, New Jersey, belonging to Shesta's brother in-law as mailing address and laboratory but soon moved to a former night club in Pompton Plains to provide space for rocket engine testing and machine work.

In 1945 RMI was granted a contract from the United States Army to develop a rocket engine for the first of the "X" series of experimental airplanes, designed to break the sound barrier. Undaunted by the 1946 death of British test pilot Geoffrey de Havilland Jr., the company eventually furnished the X-1 project with a design based upon four of Wyld's engines which would provide 1,500 pounds of thrust each.

On October 14, 1947, American test pilot Chuck Yeager was the first in the world to break the sound barrier, piloting the X-1 with the four Reaction Motors, Inc. engines. Yeager was able to complete his flight safely due to the remarkably smooth flight provided by Wyld's system and despite the fact that he had broken several ribs while horse-riding the previous day.

=== Merger with Thiokol and the Space Race ===
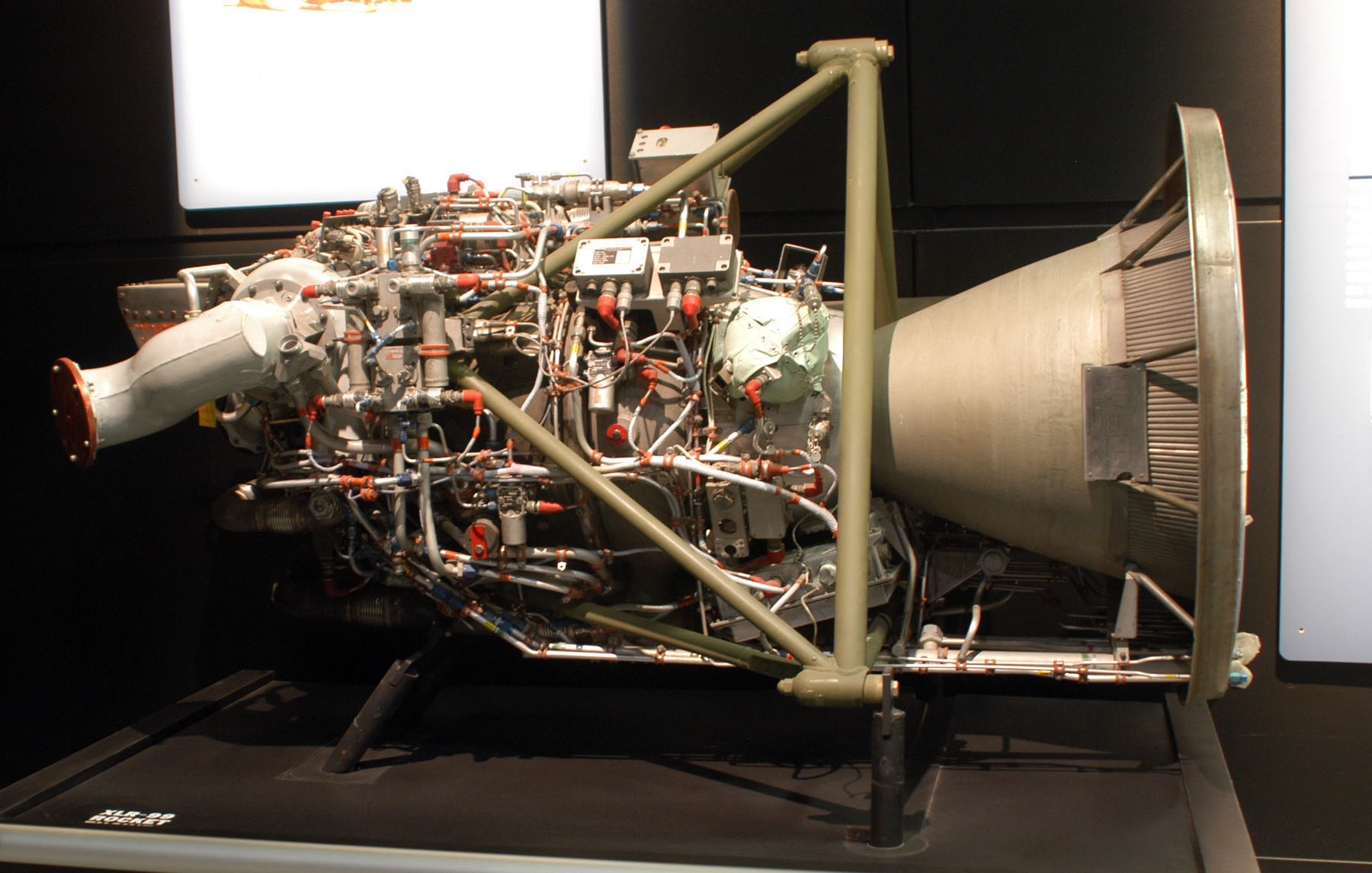
The XLR-99 engine.

In early 1956, following an extensive bidding war, Reaction Motors, Inc. was awarded a contract from the United States Navy for the development of the proposed XLR30 engine to be used to power the experimental aircraft known as X-15 and eventually pursue crewed spaceflight.

After much misadventure, a massive increase in budgetary requirements, and engineering problems related to fuel injectors and the thrust chamber, which resulted in the Navy enlisting the assistance of the Rocketdyne Division of North American Aviation, the XLR30 engine project was moved back on track with a new designation of XLR-99-RM-1 to convey the striking changes in design which were required.

On April 17, 1958, RMI's acquisition by Thiokol Chemical Corporation was finalized by the approval of the stockholders and RMI was henceforth referred to as Reaction Motors Division (RMD).

RMD's XLR99 engine for the X-15 was first flown in November 1960 and 199 flights were made before the X-15 project was discontinued in 1969, years past its due date and having cost more than five times its original budget. The X-15 is credited as having reached a record Mach 6.72 at 67 miles above the Earth, being solely responsible for providing the data necessary to insulate and maintain the structural integrity of the Mercury spacecraft, and a host of additional technical achievements and aviation milestones.

During this time RMD also developed the liquid engine for the AGM-12 Bullpup missile and the vernier engines of the Surveyor probes. Thiokol finally disbanded RMD in 1972.

== Products ==
- Reaction Motors CML2N - used on KA2N Gorgon IIA and KA3N Gorgon III missiles
- Reaction Motors LR2-RM-2 and LR2-RM-6 - used on the SAM-N-2 Lark missile
- Reaction Motors XLR10 - used on Viking (rocket)
- Reaction Motors XLR11 - used on various vehicles, including the Bell X-1, Douglas D-558-2 Skyrocket, and the early North American X-15 rocket planes
- Reaction Motors XLR30-RM-2 - planned for the X-15, canceled in favor of the XLR99
- Reaction Motors XLR35-RM-1 - used on the RTV-A-2 Hiroc missile
- Reaction Motors XLR-99 - used on the North American X-15
- Reaction Motors LR58-RM-4 - used on the AGM-12 Bullpup missile

== Patents filed ==
(partial list)

- 3095694 - Reaction motor which does not require booster at high altitudes
- 2637973 - "Rocket Engine Having Turbine Located in Nozzle for Driving Auxiliaries"
- 2479888 - "Controlling System for Reaction Motors"
