= Karel Bossart =

Rocket designer

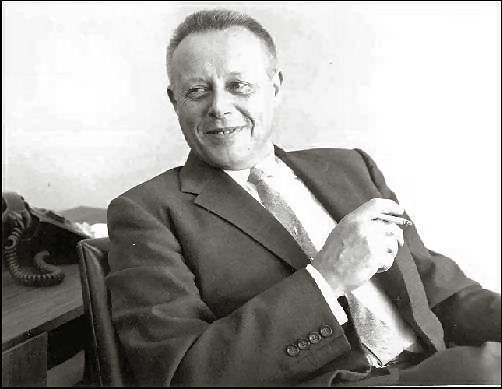
- Born: Karel Jan Bossart; February 9, 1904; Antwerp, Belgium
- Died: August 3, 1975 (aged 71); San Diego, California, U.S.
- Citizenship: Belgian–American
- Education: Université libre de Bruxelles
- Occupation: Rocket engineer
- Known for: Atlas ICBM
- Spouse: Cornelia Chase
- Children: 3
- Awards: Exceptional Civilian Award

Karel Jan Bossart (February 9, 1904 – August 3, 1975) was an innovative rocket designer and creator of the Atlas ICBM. His achievements rank alongside those of Wernher von Braun and Sergei Korolev. But as most of his work was for the United States Air Force and was therefore classified, his achievements are not widely known.

== Biography ==
Karel Bossart was born on February 9, 1904, in Antwerp, Belgium. He graduated in Mining Engineering at the Université libre de Bruxelles in 1924. After winning a scholarship to Massachusetts Institute of Technology under the Belgian American Educational Foundation to study aeronautical engineering, he remained in the United States, working for various aircraft companies. In 1945 he was chief of structures at Convair and proposed to the United States Air Force that a missile could be developed with a range of 8000 km. The Air Force was skeptical of Bossart's proposal, partly wishing to preserve the priority of strategic bombers, but granted him a limited contract to develop a prototype. Bossart's major innovation was the use of a monocoque design in which structural support was maintained by pressure within the inelastic fuel tanks. After a series of tests in 1947 the Air Force lost interest and Bossart was instructed to abandon the research, but by 1951 the escalation of the Cold War enabled Bossart to revive the project that became known as 'Atlas'. In 1955 the Central Intelligence Agency reported that Soviet Russia had made swift progress on its own intercontinental ballistic missile (ICBM) programme and Atlas became a crash project of the highest national importance. Bossart used this opportunity to advance work with high energy cryogenic fuels that resulted in the Centaur upper stage.

Atlas was first launched in June 1957 but was never fully effective as an ICBM. However, used as a launch vehicle, the Atlas design has excelled and has formed the basis of the most successful and reliable expendable rockets in service. As a result, Bossart's achievements include

- Launch of first communications satellite;
- Launch of first United States orbital crewed missions;
- Launch of Mariner probes to Mars and Venus; and
- Launch of Pioneer 10 and Pioneer 11 to Jupiter and Saturn.

In 1955 Bossart became chief engineer of the Atlas project and in 1957 was promoted to Technical Director of Aeronautics at General Dynamics. On December 17, 1957, eleven years of Bossart's work climaxed in the first successful flight of the Atlas. A few days later, on December 22, 1957, he appeared on What's My Line? as a guest credited as "Rocket Designer U.S.A.F. Atlas Missile". The next year, the Air Force awarded him the Exceptional Civilian Award for his work in developing America's first ICBM.

His co-workers called Bossart one of the finest technical men in the country. They credit him with having spearheaded a major phase in the art of rocketry.

In 1965, Bossart was inducted into the International Aerospace Hall of Fame for his pioneering contributions to the Atlas rocket system. He is featured in the Hall of Fame's exhibit within the San Diego Air and Space Museum. Bossart was later inducted into the International Space Hall of Fame in 1990.

Bossart died on August 3, 1975, in San Diego, California.
