= John H. Griffith =

Pilot

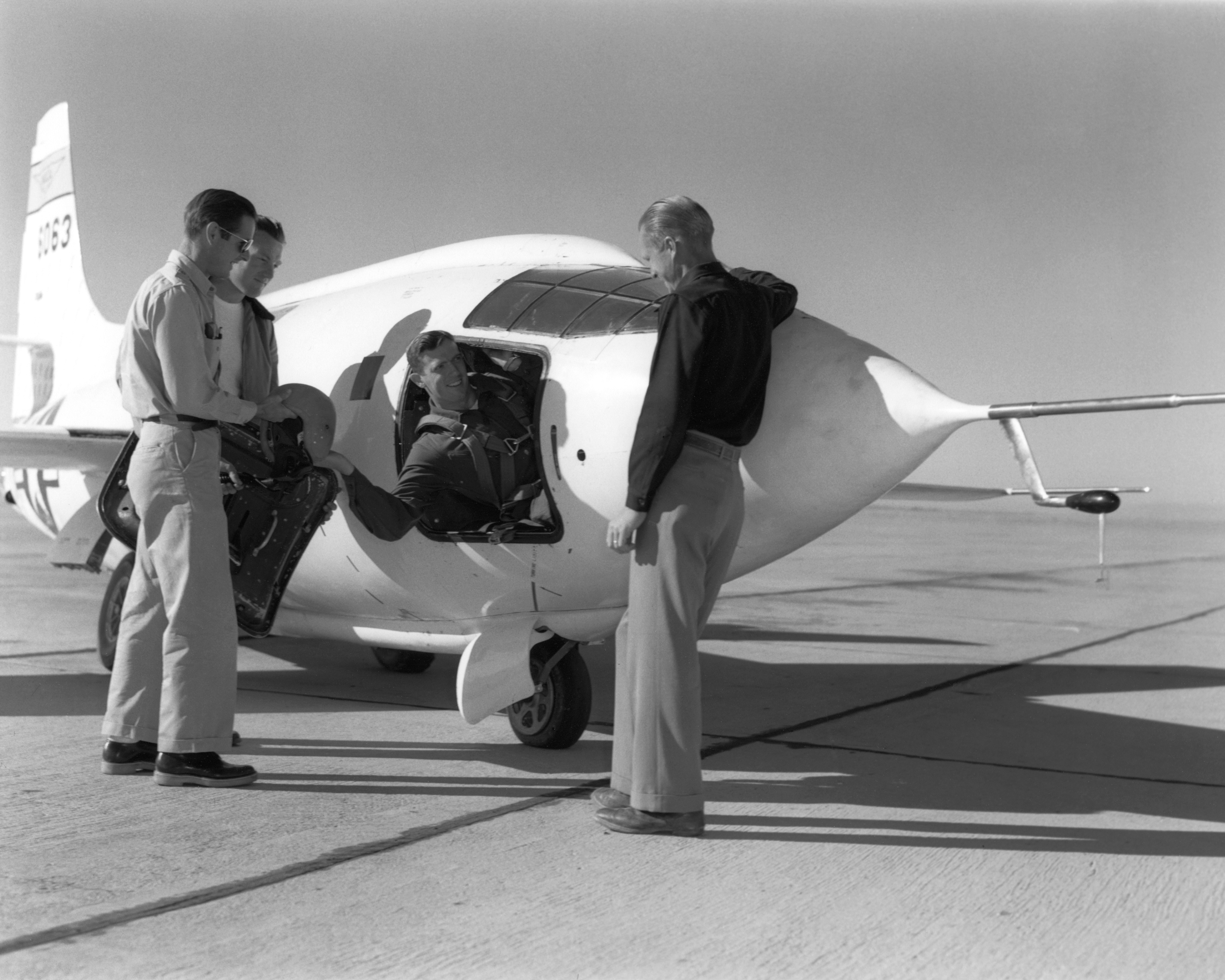
John Griffith leaning out the hatch of the X-1 #2

John H. Griffith was a test pilot for the National Advisory Committee for Aeronautics, one of the pilots of the Bell X-1.

Griffith grew up in Homewood, Illinois. He joined the United States Army Air Corps in November 1941, and served in New Guinea for the 7th Fighter Squadron the during World War II. He flew 189 missions in the Curtiss P-40 fighter and was awarded two Distinguished Flying Crosses and four Air Medals.

Following the war, he attended Purdue University, earning a bachelor of science degree with distinction in aeronautical engineering. He then joined the NACA's Lewis Flight Propulsion Laboratory. At Lewis he piloted the B-24M "flying icing wind tunnel" research aircraft and he was involved in tests of ramjet aircraft. In August, 1949, Griffith became a research pilot at the NACA High-Speed Flight Research Station (now Armstrong Flight Research Center). He flew the experimental aircraft the Bell X-1 (nine flights), X-4 Bantam (three flights), Douglas Skystreak (fifteen flights), and Douglas Skyrocket (nine flights). On May 26, 1950, he piloted the X-1 #2 to its highest speed of Mach 1.20. He was the first NACA pilot to fly the X-4.

Griffith left the NACA in 1950 to fly for private companies — Chance Vought, United Airlines, and for Westinghouse. At Vought, in 1951, he was the Senior Experimental Pilot on the F7U Cutlass. At Westinghouse, he became the Chief Engineering Test Pilot. He later worked for the Federal Aviation Administration, assisting in the development of a never-completed supersonic transport plane. He subsequently returned to United Airlines as a flight instructor, until retiring to Penn Valley, California.

Griffith is one of the 2006 inductees into the Lancaster, California Aerospace Walk of Honor

John H. Griffith died October 21, 2011, at the Sierra Nevada Memorial Hospital, Grass Valley, California, from pneumonia and a dissected aorta. He was 90 years old.
