= 8026 Johnmckay =

Hungaria asteroid and very slow rotator

Discovery
- Discovered by: E. F. Helin
- Discovery site: Palomar Obs.
- Discovery date: 8 May 1991

Designations
- Named after: John B. McKay (test pilot)
- Alternative designations: 1991 JA_{1} · 1989 UF_{2}
- Minor planet category: main-belt · (inner); Hungaria

Orbital characteristics
- Epoch 4 September 2017 (JD 2458000.5)
- Uncertainty parameter 0
- Observation arc: 27.33 yr (9,981 days)
- Aphelion: 2.0697 AU
- Perihelion: 1.7809 AU
- Semi-major axis: 1.9253 AU
- Eccentricity: 0.0750
- Orbital period (sidereal): 2.67 yr (976 days)
- Mean anomaly: 181.46°
- Mean motion: 0° 22^{m} 8.04^{s} / day
- Inclination: 19.936°
- Longitude of ascending node: 217.71°
- Argument of perihelion: 145.66°
- Known satellites: 1

Physical characteristics
- Dimensions: 1.690±0.239 km 2.54 km (calculated)
- Synodic rotation period: 355±5 h 372±5 h
- Geometric albedo: 0.30 (assumed); 0.815±0.196
- Spectral type: E
- Absolute magnitude (H): 14.60±0.44 · 14.7 · 14.9

8026 Johnmckay, provisional designation 1991 JA_{1}, is a binary Hungaria asteroid and very slow rotator from the inner regions of the asteroid belt, approximately 2 kilometers in diameter. It was discovered on 8 May 1991, by American astronomer Eleanor Helin at the U.S. Palomar Observatory, California, and later named for NASA test pilot John B. McKay.

== Classification and orbit ==
The bright E-type asteroid is a member of the Hungaria family, which form the innermost dense concentration of asteroids in the Solar System. Johnmckay orbits the Sun in the inner main-belt at a distance of 1.8–2.1 AU once every 2 years and 8 months (976 days). Its orbit has an eccentricity of 0.08 and an inclination of 20° with respect to the ecliptic. The first observation was made at the discovering observatory in 1989, extending the asteroid's observation arc by almost 2 years prior to its discovery.

== Diameter estimates ==
According to the survey carried out by the NEOWISE mission of NASA's Wide-field Infrared Survey Explorer, Johnmckay measures 1.7 kilometers in diameter and its surface has an exceptionally high albedo of 0.81, while the Collaborative Asteroid Lightcurve Link assumes a standard albedo for Hungaria asteroids of 0.30, and calculates a diameter of 2.5 kilometers, based on an absolute magnitude of 14.9.

== Lightcurves ==
=== Primary ===
Two rotational lightcurves of Johnmckay were obtained for this asteroid from photometric observations by U.S. astronomer Brian D. Warner at the Palmer Divide Station (PDO), Colorado. In August 2010, the first lightcurve gave a long rotation period of 372±5 hours with a brightness variation of 1.0 in magnitude (U=3). The second lightcurve from June 2015, gave a similar period of 355±5 with an amplitude of 0.66 in magnitude (U=2).

This makes Johnmckay one of the Top 100+ slowest rotators known to exist.

=== Moon ===
In 2010 a small asteroid moon was discovered around this asteroid. It has an orbital period of 2.300±0.001 hours, while observations at the PDO gave it a period of 2.2981 and 14.93 hours, respectively.

== Naming ==
This minor planet was named in memory of NASA test pilot John B. McKay (1922–1975), one of the first pilots assigned to fly the North American X-15. He was also assigned to the X-1E and to the D-558-II. He died in 1975, from injuries he had sustained during a X-15 crash. In 2005, he received posthumous the astronaut badge for a reached peak-altitude of 89,900 metres (295,000 feet). The approved naming citation was published by the Minor Planet Center on 7 February 2012 (M.P.C. 78269).
