= List of X-1B flights =

The X-1B aircraft 48-1385 made 27 flights between September 24, 1954, and January 23, 1958. The first ten were conducted by the United States Air Force (USAF) and the remaining 17 by the National Advisory Committee for Aeronautics (NACA). The first two planned powered flights were aborted and completed as glide flights, while the first powered flight took place on October 8, 1954. Subsequent flights included research into aerodynamic heating, stability and control, and reaction controls. On December 2, 1954, the aircraft reached Mach 2.3 and an altitude of 21,336 metres (70,000 ft).

== X-1B pilots ==
Pilot	Agency	Flights	Aircraft
Neil Armstrong	NACA	4	48-1385
John McKay	NACA	13	48-1385
Stuart Childs	USAF	1	48-1385
Frank Everest	USAF	2	48-1385
Horace Hanes	USAF	1	48-1385
Richard Harer	USAF	1	48-1385
Stanley Holtoner	USAF	1	48-1385
Arthur Murray	USAF	1	48-1385
Jack Ridley	USAF	2	48-1385
Robert Stephens	USAF	1	48-1385

== X-1B flights ==
Vehicle Flight #	Date	Pilot	Aircraft	Agency	Velocity -Mach-	Altitude: m -	Comments
X-1B #1	September 24, 1954	Jack Ridley	48-1385	USAF 1	?	?	Planned powered flight. Turbopump overspeed caused abort. Glide flight.
X-1B #2	October 6, 1954	Jack Ridley	48-1385	USAF 2	?	?	Planned powered flight. High lox-tank pressure caused abort. Glide flight.
X-1B #3	October 8, 1954	Frank Everest	48-1385	USAF 3	?	?	First powered flight. Checkout and familiarization.
X-1B #4	October 13, 1954	Robert Stephens	48-1385	USAF 4	?	?	-
X-1B #5	October 19, 1954	Stuart Childs	48-1385	USAF 5	?	?	-
X-1B #6	October 26, 1954	Horace Hanes	48-1385	USAF 6	?	?	-
X-1B #7	November 4, 1954	Richard Harer	48-1385	USAF 7	?	?	-
X-1B #8	November 26, 1954	Stanley Holtoner	48-1385	USAF 8	?	?	-
X-1B #9	November 30, 1954	Frank Everest	48-1385	USAF 9	?	?	-
X-1B #10	December 2, 1954	Frank Everest	48-1385	USAF 10	2.3	21,336 (70,000 feet)	Second flight of X-1 over Mach 2 after Chuck Yeager in 1953 in X-1A
X-1B #11	August 14, 1956	John McKay	48-1385	NACA 1	?	?	Pilot familiarization. Nose gear failed on landing. Minor damage.
X-1B #12	August 29, 1956	John McKay	48-1385	NACA 2	?	?	Cabin pressure regulator malfunctioned. Inner canopy cracked. Low speed, low altitude maneuvers.
X-1B #13	September 7, 1956	John McKay	48-1385	NACA 3	1.8	17,080	High speed flight. Heating data gathered.
X-1B #14	September 18, 1956	John McKay	48-1385	NACA 4	?	?	Erratic engine start. Glide flight.
X-1B #15	September 28, 1956	John McKay	48-1385	NACA 5	?	18,300	Three chamber engine flight. Heating data obtained.
X-1B #16	January 3, 1957	John McKay	48-1385	NACA 6	1.94	?	Last aerodynamic heating data flight.
X-1B #17	May 22, 1957	John McKay	48-1385	NACA 7	1.45	18,300	Flight instrumentation check. Control pulses at speed.
X-1B #18	June 7, 1957	John McKay	48-1385	NACA 8	1.5	18,300	Supersonic maneuvers at speed and altitude to determine dynamic and static stability and control characteristics.
X-1B #19	June 24, 1957	John McKay	48-1385	NACA 9	1.5	18,300	Supersonic maneuvers at speed and altitude to determine dynamic and static stability and control characteristics.
X-1B #20	July 11, 1957	John McKay	48-1385	NACA 10	?	?	Aborted after launch. Gear door open warning. Propellants jettisoned. Glide flight.
X-1B #21	July 19, 1957	John McKay	48-1385	NACA 11	1.65	18,300	Control pulses, 2 g wind-up turn, sideslips.
X-1B #22	July 29, 1957	John McKay	48-1385	NACA 12	1.55	18,300	Enlarged wing tips installed to simulate addition of reaction controls.
X-1B #23	August 8, 1957	John McKay	48-1385	NACA 13	1.55	18,300	Stability, control tests. Accelerated maneuvers, control pulses, pull-ups.
X-1B #24	August 15, 1957	Neil Armstrong	48-1385	NACA 14	?	?	Pilot familiarization. Nose gear failed on landing. Minor damage.
X-1B #25	November 27, 1957	Neil Armstrong	48-1385	NACA 15	?	?	First reaction-control flight.
X-1B #26	January 16, 1958	Neil Armstrong	48-1385	NACA 16	?	?	Low-altitude, low-mach reaction-control tests.
X-1B #27	January 23, 1958	Jack McKay	48-1385	NACA 17	1.5	16,775	Reaction-control tests. Last NACA flight.

== See also ==
- Bell X-1
- Neil Armstrong
- John McKay
