= List of X-1E flights =

This is a list of flights made in the Bell X-1E airplane.

== X-1E pilots ==
Pilot	Agency	Flights	Aircraft
John B. McKay	NACA	5	46-063
Joseph A. Walker	NACA	21	46-063

== X-1E flights ==
Vehicle Flight #	Date	Pilot	Aircraft	Agency	Velocity -Mach-	Altitude: m -	Comments
X-1E #1	December 12, 1955	Joseph Walker	46-063	NACA 1	?	?	Pilot familiarization. Glide flight. Low speed evaluation.
X-1E #2	December 15, 1955	Joseph Walker	46-063	NACA 2	?	?	First powered flight. Engine ran overpressure, overspeeds with two automatic shutdowns. Pilot shutdown engine.
X-1E #3	April 3, 1956	Joseph Walker	46-063	NACA 3	0.85	9,150	Cylinder 1 did not fire. Damping characteristics good.
X-1E #4	April 30, 1956	Joseph Walker	46-063	NACA 4	?	?	Turbopump didn't start. No engine start.
X-1E #5	May 11, 1956	Joseph Walker	46-063	NACA 5	0.84	?	Turns from mach 0.69 to 0.84. Control pulses.
X-1E #6	June 7, 1956	Joseph Walker	46-063	NACA 6	1.55	13,725	Longitudinal, lateral trim changes in transonic region bothersome to pilot..
X-1E #7	June 18, 1956	Joseph Walker	46-063	NACA 7	1.74	18,300	Damaged while landing.
X-1E #8	July 26, 1956	Joseph Walker	46-063	NACA 8	?	?	Subsonic flight. Cylinders 3 and 4 didn't fire.
X-1E #9	August 31, 1956	Joseph Walker	46-063	NACA 9	2.0	18,300	Sideslips, pulses, rolls.
X-1E #10	September 14, 1956	Joseph Walker	46-063	NACA 10	2.1	18,910	Stabilizer, rudder, aileron pulses.
X-1E #11	September 20, 1956	Joseph Walker	46-063	NACA 11	?	?	Brief engine power. Engine malfunction. Flight aborted.
X-1E #12	October 3, 1956	Joseph Walker	46-063	NACA 12	?	?	Engine fired for only 60 seconds. Flight aborted. Engine and turbopump replaced.
X-1E #13	November 20, 1956	Joseph Walker	46-063	NACA 13	?	?	Engine did not start due to lack of manifold pressure.
X-1E #14	April 25, 1957	Joseph Walker	46-063	NACA 14	1.71	20,435	Aileron, rudder pulses.
X-1E #15	May 15, 1957	Joseph Walker	46-063	NACA 15	1.5	22,265	Aileron pulses, rolls, sideslips, wind-up turns. Aircraft was severely damaged on landing.
X-1E #16	September 19, 1957	Joseph Walker	46-063	NACA 16	?	?	Planned velocity not achieved due to loss of power during pushover from climb.
X-1E #17	October 8, 1957	Joseph Walker	46-063	NACA 17	2.24	?	Highest speed attained by X-1E.
X-1E #18	May 14, 1958	Joseph Walker	46-063	NACA 18	?	21,350	First flight with ventral fins. Longitudinal, lateral stability, control maneuvers tests. Engine air start at altitude.
X-1E #19	June 10, 1958	Joseph Walker	46-063	NACA 19	?	?	Flight aborted. Only 1 engine cylinder fired. Aircraft damaged on landing.
X-1E #20	September 10, 1958	Joseph Walker	46-063	NACA 20	?	?	Stability, control tests with ventral fins.
X-1E #21	September 17, 1958	Joseph Walker	46-063	NACA 21	?	?	Stability, control tests with ventral fins. New stabilizer bell crank allowed greater stabilizer travel.
X-1E #22	September 19, 1958	John McKay	46-063	NACA 22	?	?	Pilot familiarization.
X-1E #23	September 30, 1958	John McKay	46-063	NACA 23	?	?	Tests of low-speed stability and control.
X-1E #24	October 16, 1958	John McKay	46-063	NACA 24	?	?	First flight of modified engine with increased chamber pressure. Flight shortened due to overcast obscuring view of lakebed.
X-1E #25	October 28, 1958	John McKay	46-063	NACA 25	?	?	Good data obtained on new elevated chamber pressure, stability and control.
X-1E #26	November 6, 1958	John McKay	46-063	NACA 26	?	?	Low-altitude and low-mach investigation of new U-Deta fuel. Last flight. Aircraft grounded due to significant crack in the fuel tank wall.

== See also ==
- Bell X-1
- John B. McKay
- Joseph A. Walker
