= List of X-4 flights =

== X-4 pilots ==
| Pilot | Agency | Flights | Aircraft |
|---|---|---|---|
| A.Boyd | USAF | 1 | 46-677 |
| Frank Everest | USAF | 4 | 46-677 |
| R.L. Johnson | USAF | 1 | 46-677 |
| J.S. Nash | USAF | 1 | 46-677 |
| Chuck Yeager | USAF | 7 | 46-677 |
| S.P. Butchart | NACA | 4 | 46-677 |
| George Cooper | NACA | 1 | 46-677 |
| Scott Crossfield | NACA | 29 | 46-677 |
| John Griffith | NACA | 7 | 46-677 |
| W.P. Jones | NACA | 14 | 46-677 |
| John McKay | NACA | 1 | 46-677 |
| Joseph Walker | NACA | 1 | 46-677 |
| Charles Tucker | Northrop | 31 | 46-676/46-677 |

== X-4 flights ==
| Vehicle Flight # | Date | Pilot | Aircraft | Agency | Velocity -Mach- | Altitude: m - | Comments |
|---|---|---|---|---|---|---|---|
| X-4 #1 | August 18, 1950 | Chuck Yeager | 46-677 | USAF 1 | ? | ? | Air Force flight. Pilot familiarization. |
| X-4 #2 | August 22, 1950 | Frank Everest | 46-677 | USAF 2 | ? | ? | Air Force flight. Pilot familiarization. |
| X-4 #3 | August 22, 1950 | Frank Everest | 46-677 | USAF 3 | ? | ? | Aborted, landing gear malfunction. |
| X-4 #4 | August 30, 1950 | Frank Everest | 46-677 | USAF 4 | ? | ? | Handling qualities. |
| X-4 #5 | August 31, 1950 | Frank Everest | 46-677 | USAF 5 | ? | ? | Same as flight 4. |
| X-4 #6 | September 8, 1950 | Chuck Yeager | 46-677 | USAF 6 | ? | ? | Longitudinal and latitudinal stability and control. |
| X-4 #7 | September, 1950 | Chuck Yeager | 46-677 | USAF 7 | ? | ? | Aborted, faulty canopy lock. |
| X-4 #8 | September, 1950 | Chuck Yeager | 46-677 | USAF 8 | ? | ? | Longitudinal and latitudinal dynamic stability and control. |
| X-4 #9 | September, 1950 | Chuck Yeager | 46-677 | USAF 9 | ? | ? | Same as flight 8. |
| X-4 #10 | September, 1950 | Chuck Yeager | 46-677 | USAF 10 | ? | ? | Same as flight 8. |
| X-4 #11 | September, 1950 | Chuck Yeager | 46-677 | USAF 11 | ? | ? | Same as flight 8. |
| X-4 #12 | September 22, 1950 | - | 46-677 | USAF 12 | ? | ? | Air Force flight. Pilot familiarization. |
| X-4 #13 | September-November, 1950 | A. Boyd | 46-677 | USAF 13 | ? | ? | Air Force flight. Pilot familiarization. |
| X-4 #14 | September-November, 1950 | J.S. Nash | 46-677 | USAF 14 | ? | ? | Air Force flight. Pilot familiarization. Airspeed calibration. |
| X-4 #15 | September-November, 1950 | John Griffith | 46-677 | NACA 1 | ? | ? | First NACA pilot checkflight. |
| X-4 #16 | September-November, 1950 | John Griffith | 46-677 | NACA 2 | ? | ? | Longitudinal, latitudinal, directional stability, and control. |
| X-4 #17 | September-November, 1950 | John Griffith | 46-677 | NACA 3 | ? | ? | Same as flight 16. |
| X-4 #18 | September-November, 1950 | John Griffith | 46-677 | NACA 4 | ? | ? | Same as flight 16. |
| X-4 #19 | September-November, 1950 | John Griffith | 46-677 | NACA 5 | ? | ? | Same as flight 16. |
| X-4 #20 | November 7, 1950 | John Griffith | 46-677 | NACA 6 | ? | ? | Same as flight 16. |
| X-4 #21 | November 17, 1950 | John Griffith | 46-677 | NACA 7 | ? | ? | Same as flight 16. |
| X-4 #22 | December 6, 1950 | R.L. Johnson | 46-677 | USAF 15 | ? | ? | Air Force flight. Pilot familiarization. |
| X-4 #23 | December 6, 1950 | Scott Crossfield | 46-677 | NACA 8 | ? | ? | NACA pilot checkflight. Aborted. |
| X-4 #24 | December 15, 1950 | Scott Crossfield | 46-677 | NACA 9 | ? | ? | Aborted; instrument malfunction. |
| X-4 #25 | December 28, 1950 | Scott Crossfield | 46-677 | NACA 10 | ? | ? | Longitudinal, latitudinal, directional stability and control. |
| X-4 #26 | January 4, 1951 | Scott Crossfield | 46-677 | NACA 11 | ? | ? | Same as flight 25. |
| X-4 #27 | January 17, 1951 | Scott Crossfield | 46-677 | NACA 12 | ? | ? | Same as flight 25. |
| X-4 #28 | January 19, 1951 | Scott Crossfield | 46-677 | NACA 13 | ? | ? | Aborted, landing gear malfunction. |
| X-4 #29 | January 24, 1951 | Scott Crossfield | 46-677 | NACA 14 | ? | ? | Aborted, instrument malfunction. |
| X-4 #30 | January 26, 1951 | Scott Crossfield | 46-677 | NACA 15 | ? | ? | Longitudinal, latitudinal, directional stability and control. |
| X-4 #31 | February 19, 1951 | Scott Crossfield | 46-677 | NACA 16 | ? | ? | Same as flight 30. |
| X-4 #32 | March 19, 1951 | Scott Crossfield | 46-677 | NACA 17 | ? | ? | Same as flight 30. |
| X-4 #33 | March 26, 1951 | Scott Crossfield | 46-677 | NACA 18 | ? | ? | Same as flight 30. |
| X-4 #34 | March 28, 1951 | Scott Crossfield | 46-677 | NACA 19 | ? | ? | Same as flight 30. |
| X-4 #35 | April 12, 1951 | Scott Crossfield | 46-677 | NACA 20 | ? | ? | Same as flight 30. |
| X-4 #36 | April 13, 1951 | Scott Crossfield | 46-677 | NACA 21 | ? | ? | Same as flight 30. |
| X-4 #37 | April 17, 1951 | Scott Crossfield | 46-677 | NACA 22 | ? | ? | Same as flight 30. |
| X-4 #38 | April 20, 1951 | W.P. Jones | 46-677 | NACA 23 | ? | ? | NACA pilot check. |
| X-4 #39 | April 26, 1951 | Scott Crossfield | 46-677 | NACA 24 | ? | ? | Longitudinal, latitudinal, directional stability, and control. |
| X-4 #40 | April 27, 1951 | W.P. Jones | 46-677 | NACA 25 | ? | ? | Same as flight 39. |
| X-4 #41 | May 3, 1951 | W.P. Jones | 46-677 | NACA 26 | ? | ? | Same as flight 39. |
| X-4 #42 | May 9, 1951 | Scott Crossfield | 46-677 | NACA 27 | ? | ? | Same as flight 39. |
| X-4 #43 | May 16, 1951 | Scott Crossfield | 46-677 | NACA 28 | ? | ? | Same as flight 39. |
| X-4 #44 | May 18, 1951 | Scott Crossfield | 46-677 | NACA 29 | ? | ? | Same as flight 39. |
| X-4 #45 | May 29, 1951 | Scott Crossfield | 46-677 | NACA 30 | ? | ? | Same as flight 39. |
| X-4 #46 | August 20, 1951 | W.P. Jones | 46-677 | NACA 31 | ? | ? | First flight with thick trailing edge on speed brakes. |
| X-4 #47 | October 2, 1951 | Scott Crossfield | 46-677 | NACA 32 | ? | ? | Stability and control with thick trailing edge. |
| X-4 #48 | October 5, 1951 | Scott Crossfield | 46-677 | NACA 33 | ? | ? | Lift-to-drag variation using various speedbrake settings. |
| X-4 #49 | October 9, 1951 | Scott Crossfield | 46-677 | NACA 34 | ? | ? | Landings at various lift-to-drag ratios. |
| X-4 #50 | October 11, 1951 | Scott Crossfield | 46-677 | NACA 35 | ? | ? | Same as flight 49. |
| X-4 #51 | October 12, 1951 | W.P. Jones | 46-677 | NACA 36 | ? | ? | Same as flight 49. |
| X-4 #52 | October 17, 1951 | W.P. Jones | 46-677 | NACA 37 | ? | ? | Constant speed-drag ratios. |
| X-4 #53 | October 18, 1951 | Joseph Walker | 46-677 | NACA 38 | ? | ? | NACA pilot check; handling qualities. |
| X-4 #54 | October 19, 1951 | Joseph Walker | 46-677 | NACA 39 | ? | ? | Maneuvers and speed runs. |
| X-4 #55 | October 24, 1951 | W.P. Jones | 46-677 | NACA 40 | ? | ? | General stability and control. |
| X-4 #56 | March 6, 1952 | W.P. Jones | 46-677 | NACA 41 | ? | ? | Lift-to-drag at various speedbrake settings. |
| X-4 #57 | March 13, 1952 | W.P. Jones | 46-677 | NACA 42 | ? | ? | Directional trim change invest. |
| X-4 #58 | March 17, 1952 | W.P. Jones | 46-677 | NACA 43 | ? | ? | Lift-to-drag variation with speedbrakes. |
| X-4 #59 | March 21, 1952 | W.P. Jones | 46-677 | NACA 44 | ? | ? | Lift-to-drag variation studies. |
| X-4 #60 | March 25, 1952 | W.P. Jones | 46-677 | NACA 45 | ? | ? | Dynamic stability invest. |
| X-4 #61 | March 26, 1952 | W.P. Jones | 46-677 | NACA 46 | ? | ? | Same as flight 60. |
| X-4 #62 | March 27, 1952 | S.P. Butchart | 46-677 | NACA 47 | ? | ? | NACA pilot check. |
| X-4 #63 | May 19, 1952 | W.P. Jones | 46-677 | NACA 48 | ? | ? | Check flight with thickened trailing edge on elevons. |
| X-4 #64 | August 6, 1952 | Scott Crossfield | 46-677 | NACA 49 | ? | ? | Stability and control with thickened elevons. |
| X-4 #65 | August 11, 1952 | - | 46-677 | NACA 50 | ? | ? | Aborted; engine malfunction. |
| X-4 #66 | September 16, 1952 | - | 46-677 | NACA 51 | ? | ? | Aborted; instrument malfunction. |
| X-4 #67 | September 22, 1952 | - | 46-677 | NACA 52 | ? | ? | - |
| X-4 #68 | September 23, 1952 | Scott Crossfield | 46-677 | NACA 53 | ? | ? | Stability and control with thickened elevons. |
| X-4 #69 | March 27, 1953 | Scott Crossfield | 46-677 | NACA 54 | ? | ? | Same as flight 68. |
| X-4 #70 | April 29, 1954 | Scott Crossfield | 46-677 | NACA 55 | ? | ? | Airspeed calibration with thickened elevons. |
| X-4 #71 | April 30, 1954 | Scott Crossfield | 46-677 | NACA 56 | ? | ? | High-lift stability and control. |
| X-4 #72 | May 20, 1954 | S.P. Butchart | 46-677 | NACA 57 | ? | ? | Dynamic stability without thickened elevons. |
| X-4 #73 | July 1, 1954 | S.P. Butchart | 46-677 | NACA 58 | ? | ? | Same as flight 72. |
| X-4 #74 | July 3, 1954 | S.P. Butchart | 46-677 | NACA 59 | ? | ? | Same as flight 72. |
| X-4 #75 | July 3-August, 1954 | George Cooper | 46-677 | NACA 60 | ? | ? | NACA pilot check for Ames pilot. |
| X-4 #76 | August 11, 1954 | John McKay | 46-677 | NACA 61 | ? | ? | NACA pilot check. |
| X-4 #77 | August, 1954 | - | 46-677 | NACA 62 | ? | ? | Dynamic Stability. |
| X-4 #78 | August, 1954 | - | 46-677 | NACA 63 | ? | ? | Dynamic Stability. |
| X-4 #79 | August 31, 1954 | - | 46-677 | NACA 64 | ? | ? | NACA pilot check. |
| X-4 #80 | September, 1954 | - | 46-677 | NACA 65 | ? | ? | NACA pilot check. |
| X-4 #81 | September, 1954 | - | 46-677 | NACA 66 | ? | ? | NACA pilot check. |
| X-4 #82 | September, 1954 | - | 46-677 | NACA 67 | ? | ? | Aileron pulses, low-speed turns with dive brakes. |

== See also ==
- X-4 Bantam
- Chuck Yeager
- Scott Crossfield
- John McKay
- Joseph Walker
