= D558 =

D558 or D-558 may refer to one of two experimental research aircraft:

- Douglas D-558-1 Skystreak
- Douglas D-558-2 Skyrocket
