= List of X-1A flights =

== X-1A pilots ==
| Pilot | Agency | Flights | Aircraft |
|---|---|---|---|
| Jean Ziegler | Bell Aircraft | 6 | 48-1384 |
| Joseph Walker | NACA | 2 | 48-1384 |
| Arthur Murray | USAF | 14 | 48-1384 |
| Chuck Yeager | USAF | 4 | 48-1384 |

== X-1A flights ==
| Vehicle Flight # | Date | Pilot | Aircraft | Agency | Velocity -Mach- | Altitude: m - | Comments |
|---|---|---|---|---|---|---|---|
| X-1A #1 | February 14, 1953 | Jean Ziegler | 48-1384 | Bell 1 | ? | ? | Pilot familiarization. Fuel jettison test. Glide flight. |
| X-1A #2 | February 14, 1953 | Jean Ziegler | 48-1384 | Bell 2 | ? | ? | Planned powered flight. Propellant system problems. Glide flight. |
| X-1A #3 | February 21, 1953 | Jean Ziegler | 48-1384 | Bell 3 | ? | ? | First X1-A powered flight. False fire alarm. |
| X-1A #4 | March 26, 1953 | Jean Ziegler | 48-1384 | Bell 4 | ? | ? | Aircraft fired all four cylinders. |
| X-1A #5 | April 10, 1953 | Jean Ziegler | 48-1384 | Bell 5 | 0.93 | ? | Pilot found low-frequency elevator buzz at mach 0.93. |
| X-1A #6 | April 25, 1953 | Jean Ziegler | 48-1384 | Bell 6 | 0.93 | ? | Pilot again found low-frequency elevator buzz at mach 0.93. Turbopump overspeeding caused powered flight abort. |
| X-1A #7 | November 21, 1953 | Chuck Yeager | 48-1384 | USAF 1 | 1.15 | ? | Familiarization flight. |
| X-1A #8 | December 2, 1953 | Chuck Yeager | 48-1384 | USAF 2 | 1.5 | ? | - |
| X-1A #9 | December 8, 1953 | Chuck Yeager | 48-1384 | USAF 3 | 1.9 | 18,300 | First high-mach flight. Achieved mach 1.9 during slight climb. |
| X-1A #10 | December 12, 1953 | Chuck Yeager | 48-1384 | USAF 4 | 2.44 | 15,250 | Encountered severe instability above mach 2.3. Inverted spin from apogee down to 7,624 m. Pilot recovered control. |
| X-1A #11 | March 21, 1954 | Arthur Murray | 48-1384 | USAF 5 | ? | ? | Estimated flight date. |
| X-1A #12 | April 4, 1954 | Arthur Murray | 48-1384 | USAF 6 | ? | ? | Estimated flight date. |
| X-1A #13 | April 11, 1954 | Arthur Murray | 48-1384 | USAF 7 | ? | ? | Estimated flight date. |
| X-1A #14 | April 25, 1954 | Arthur Murray | 48-1384 | USAF 8 | ? | ? | Estimated flight date. |
| X-1A #15 | May 14, 1954 | Arthur Murray | 48-1384 | USAF 9 | ? | ? | Estimated flight date. |
| X-1A #16 | May 28, 1954 | Arthur Murray | 48-1384 | USAF 10 | ? | 26,564 | Attained unofficial world altitude record for that time. |
| X-1A #17 | June 4, 1954 | Arthur Murray | 48-1384 | USAF 11 | 1.97 | 27,374 | Attained unofficial world altitude record. Encountered severe instability at mach 1.97. Tumbled out of control from apogee down to 20,130 m. |
| X-1A #18 | June 18, 1954 | Arthur Murray | 48-1384 | USAF 12 | ? | ? | Estimated flight date. |
| X-1A #19 | July 2, 1954 | Arthur Murray | 48-1384 | USAF 13 | ? | ? | Estimated flight date. |
| X-1A #20 | July 16, 1954 | Arthur Murray | 48-1384 | USAF 14 | ? | ? | Estimated flight date. |
| X-1A #21 | July 30, 1954 | Arthur Murray | 48-1384 | USAF 15 | ? | ? | Estimated flight date. |
| X-1A #22 | August 8, 1954 | Arthur Murray | 48-1384 | USAF 16 | ? | ? | Estimated flight date. |
| X-1A #23 | August 19, 1954 | Arthur Murray | 48-1384 | USAF 17 | ? | ? | Estimated flight date. |
| X-1A #24 | August 26, 1954 | Arthur Murray | 48-1384 | USAF 18 | ? | 27,584 | Last USAF flight. Turned over to NACA. |
| X-1A #25 | July 20, 1955 | Joseph Walker | 48-1384 | NACA 1 | 1.45 | 13,725 | First NACA flight. Severe aileron buzz at mach 0.90 to 0.92. |
| X-1A #26 | August 8, 1955 | Joseph Walker | 48-1384 | NACA 2 | ? | ? | Planned second NACA flight. X-1A suffered small in flight explosion. Pilot exited into B-29. X-1A jettisoned and destroyed. |

== See also ==
- Bell X-1
- Chuck Yeager
- Joseph Walker
