= List of X-1D flights =

The X-1D aircraft 48-1386 completed one flight and was destroyed following an aborted second launch attempt in 1951. On July 24, Bell pilot Jean Ziegler made a familiarization glide flight, during which the nose gear broke on landing. On August 22, with United States Air Force (USAF) pilot Frank Everest aboard, the launch was aborted and a small explosion occurred during propellant jettison; Everest evacuated to the B-50, and the X-1D was jettisoned and destroyed.

== X-1D pilots ==
Pilot	Agency	Flights	Aircraft
Jean Ziegler	Bell	1	48-1386
Frank Everest	USAF	1	48-1386

== X-1D flights ==
Vehicle Flight #	Date	Pilot	Aircraft	Agency	Velocity -Mach-	Altitude: m -	Comments
X-1D #1	July 24, 1951	Jean Ziegler	48-1386	Bell 1	?	?	Pilot familiarization. Glide flight. Nose gear broken on landing.
X-1D #2	August 22, 1951	Frank Everest	48-1386	USAF 1	?	?	Launch aborted. Small explosion during propellant jettison process. Pilot evacuated to B-50. X-1D jettisoned and destroyed.

== See also ==
- Bell X-1
