= Northrop X-4 Bantam =

American experimental jet aircraft

X-4 Bantam
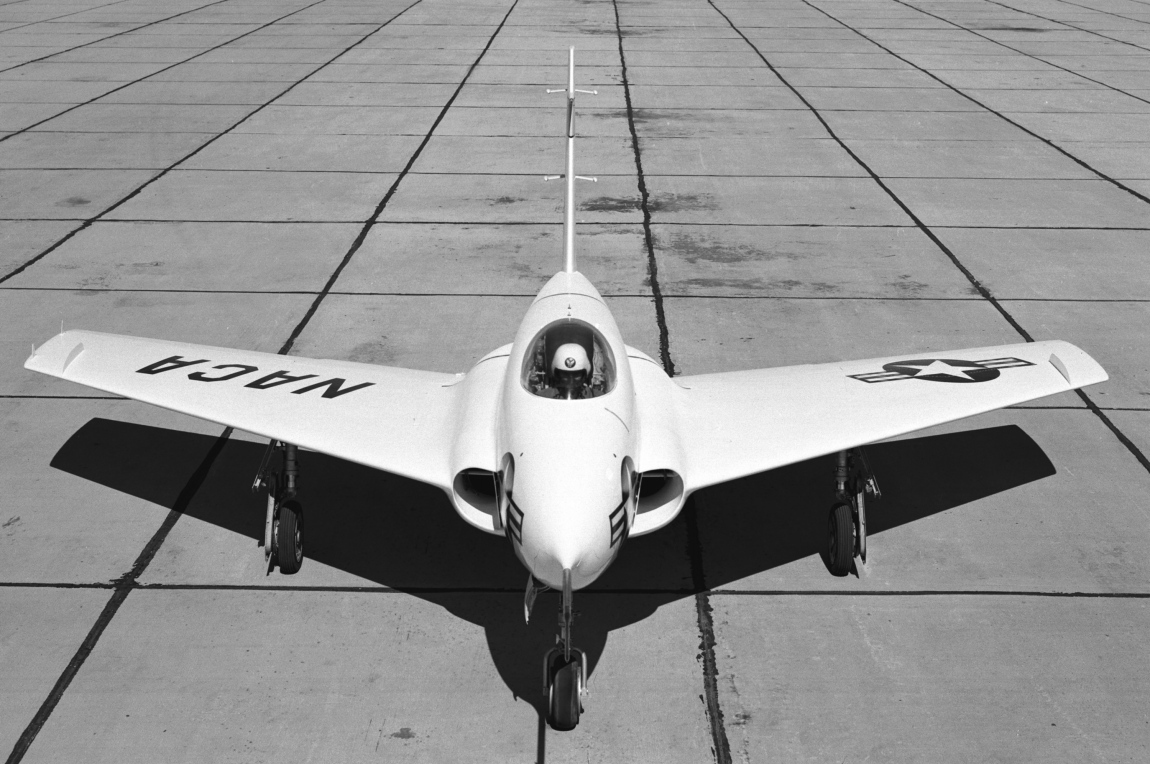
- X-4 Bantam

General information
- Type: Tailless aircraft prototype
- Manufacturer: Northrop Corporation
- Status: Retired
- Number built: 2

History
- First flight: 15 December 1948

The Northrop X-4 Bantam is a prototype small twinjet aircraft manufactured by Northrop Corporation in 1948. It had no horizontal tail surfaces, depending instead on combined elevator and aileron control surfaces (called elevons) for control in pitch and roll attitudes, almost exactly in the manner of the similar-format, rocket-powered Messerschmitt Me 163 of Nazi Germany's Luftwaffe. Some aerodynamicists had proposed that eliminating the horizontal tail would also do away with stability problems at fast speeds (called shock stall) resulting from the interaction of supersonic shock waves from the wings and the horizontal stabilizers. The idea had merit, but the flight control systems of that time prevented the X-4 from achieving any success.

== Development ==
Two X-4s were built by the Northrop Corporation, but the first was found to be mechanically unsound and after ten flights it was grounded and used to provide parts for the second. While being tested from 1950 to 1953 at the NACA High-Speed Flight Research Station (now Edwards Air Force Base), the X-4's semi-tailless configuration exhibited inherent longitudinal stability problems (porpoising) as it approached the speed of sound. It was concluded that (with the control technology available at the time) tailless craft were not suited for transonic flight.

It was believed in the 1940s that a design without horizontal stabilizers would avoid the interaction of shock waves between the wing and stabilizers. These were believed to be the source of the stability problems at transonic speeds up to Mach 0.9. Two aircraft had already been built using a semi-tailless design—the rocket-powered Me 163B Komet flown in combat by Nazi Germany's Luftwaffe in World War II, and the turbojet-powered British de Havilland DH.108 Swallow built after the war. The United States Army Air Forces signed a contract with the Northrop Aircraft Company on 11 June 1946, to build two X-4s. Northrop was selected because of its experience with flying wing designs, such as the N-9M, XB-35 and YB-49 aircraft.

The resulting aircraft was very compact, only large enough to hold two Westinghouse J30 jet engines, a pilot, instrumentation, and a 45-minute fuel supply. Nearly all maintenance work on the aircraft could be done without using a ladder or footstool. A person standing on the ground could easily look into the cockpit. The aircraft also had split flaps, which doubled as speed brakes.

== Operational history ==
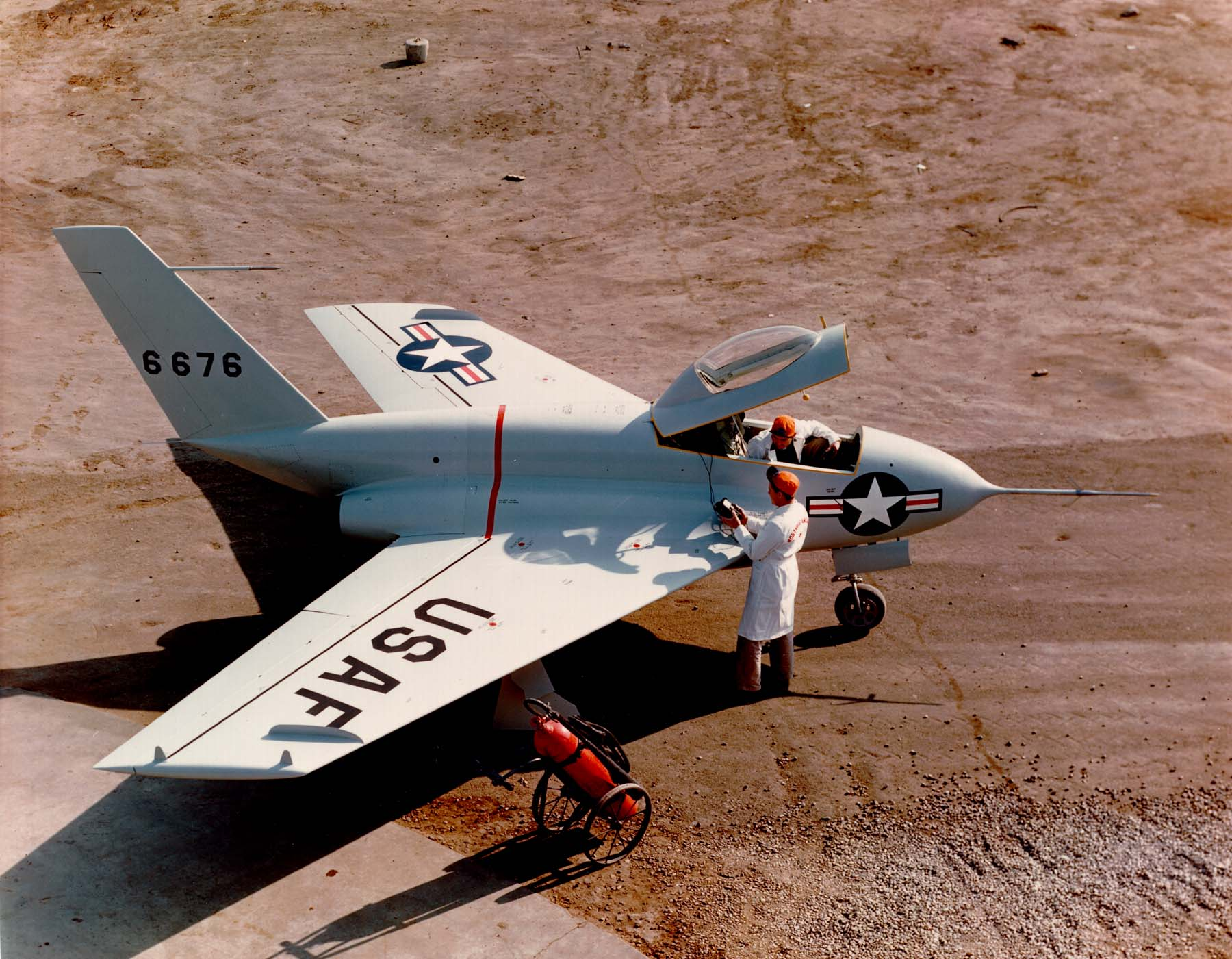
Preparing for flight

The first X-4 (serial number 46-676) was delivered to Muroc Air Force Base, California, in November 1948. It underwent taxi tests and made its first flight on December 15, 1948, with Northrop test pilot Charles Tucker at the controls. Winter rains flooded Rogers Dry Lake soon after, preventing additional X-4 flights until April 1949. The first X-4 proved mechanically unreliable, and made only ten flights. Walter C. Williams, the head of the NACA Muroc Flight Test Unit (now Dryden Flight Research Center) called the aircraft a "lemon". The second X-4 (serial number 46-677) was delivered during the halt of flights, and soon proved far more reliable. It made a total of 20 contractor flights. Despite this, the contractor flight program dragged on until February 1950, before both aircraft were turned over to the Air Force and the NACA. The first X-4 never flew again, used as spare parts for the second aircraft.

The NACA instrumented the second X-4 to conduct a short series of flights with Air Force pilots. These included Chuck Yeager, Frank Kendall Everest, Jr., Al Boyd, Richard Johnson, Fred Ascani, Arthur Murray and Jack Ridley. The flights were made in August and September 1950. The first flight by a NACA pilot was made by John H. Griffith on September 28, 1950.

The initial NACA X-4 flights, which continued from late 1950 through May of 1951, focused on the aircraft's sensitivity to pitch. NACA pilots Griffith and Scott Crossfield noted that as the X-4's speed approached Mach 0.88, it began a pitch oscillation of increasing severity, which was likened to driving on a washboard road. Increasing speeds also caused a tucking phenomenon, in which the nose pitched down, a phenomenon also experienced by the Me 163A Anton prototypes in 1941. More seriously, the aircraft also showed a tendency to "hunt" about all three axes. This combined yaw, pitch and roll, which grew more severe as the speed increased, was a precursor to the inertial coupling which would become a major challenge in the years to come.

To correct the poor stability, project engineers decided to increase the flap/speed brake trailing edge thickness. Balsa wood strips were added between the upper and lower hinged "clamshell"-style flap/speed brake halves, causing them to remain open at a 5° angle. The first test of the blunt trailing edge was flown on 20 August 1951 by NACA pilot Walter Jones. A second test was made by Crossfield in October. The results were positive, with Jones commenting that the X-4's flight qualities had been greatly improved, and the aircraft did not have pitch control problems up to a speed of Mach 0.92.

The balsa strips were removed, and the X-4 then undertook a long series of flights to test landing characteristics. By opening the speed brakes, the lift-to-drag ratio of the aircraft could be reduced to less than 3:1. This was for data on future rocket-powered aircraft. The tests continued through October 1951, until wing tank fuel leaks forced the aircraft to be grounded until March 1952, when the landing tests resumed. NACA pilots Joe Walker, Stanley Butchard, and George Cooper were also checked out in the aircraft.

The thickened flap/speed brake tests had been encouraging, so balsa wood strips were reinstalled on both the flap/speed brake and the elevons. The first flight was made by Jones on 19 May 1952, but one of the engines was damaged during the flight, and it was August before a replacement J30 could be found. When the flights resumed, they showed that the modifications had improved stability in both pitch and yaw, and delayed the nosedown trim changes from Mach 0.74 to Mach 0.91. Above Mach 0.91, however, the X-4 still oscillated.

In May 1953, the balsa wood strips were again removed, and the X-4's dynamic stability was studied in the original flap/speed brake and elevon configuration. These flights were made by Crossfield and John B. McKay. This was the final project for the X-4, which made its 81st and final NACA flight on September 29, 1953. Both aircraft survived the test program. The first X-4, AF serial number 46-676, was transferred to the United States Air Force Academy, Colorado Springs, Colorado, before being returned to Edwards Air Force Base. 46-676 has been restored as of August 2012, and is currently being held in storage pending placement in the Edwards Museum. The second X-4 went to the National Museum of the United States Air Force at Wright-Patterson Air Force Base near Dayton, Ohio, where it remains on display.

The X-4's primary importance involved proving a negative, in that a swept-wing semi-tailless design was not suitable for speeds near Mach 1, although Vought's F7U Cutlass proved to be something of a counterexample—the developed version was the first aircraft to demonstrate stores separation above Mach 1. Aircraft designers were thus able to avoid this dead end. It was not until the development of computer fly-by-wire systems that such designs could be practical. Semi-tailless designs appeared on the X-36, Have Blue, F-117, and Bird of Prey, although these aircraft all differed significantly in shape from the X-4. The trend during its test program was already towards delta and modified delta aircraft such as the Douglas F4D, the Convair F-102A derived from the XF-92A, and the Avro Vulcan.

== Aircraft on display ==
- X-4 serial number 46-676, is on display at the Flight Test Museum on Edwards Air Force Base, Edwards, California.
- X-4 serial number 46-677, is on display at the National Museum of the United States Air Force in Dayton, Ohio.

== Specifications (X-4) ==
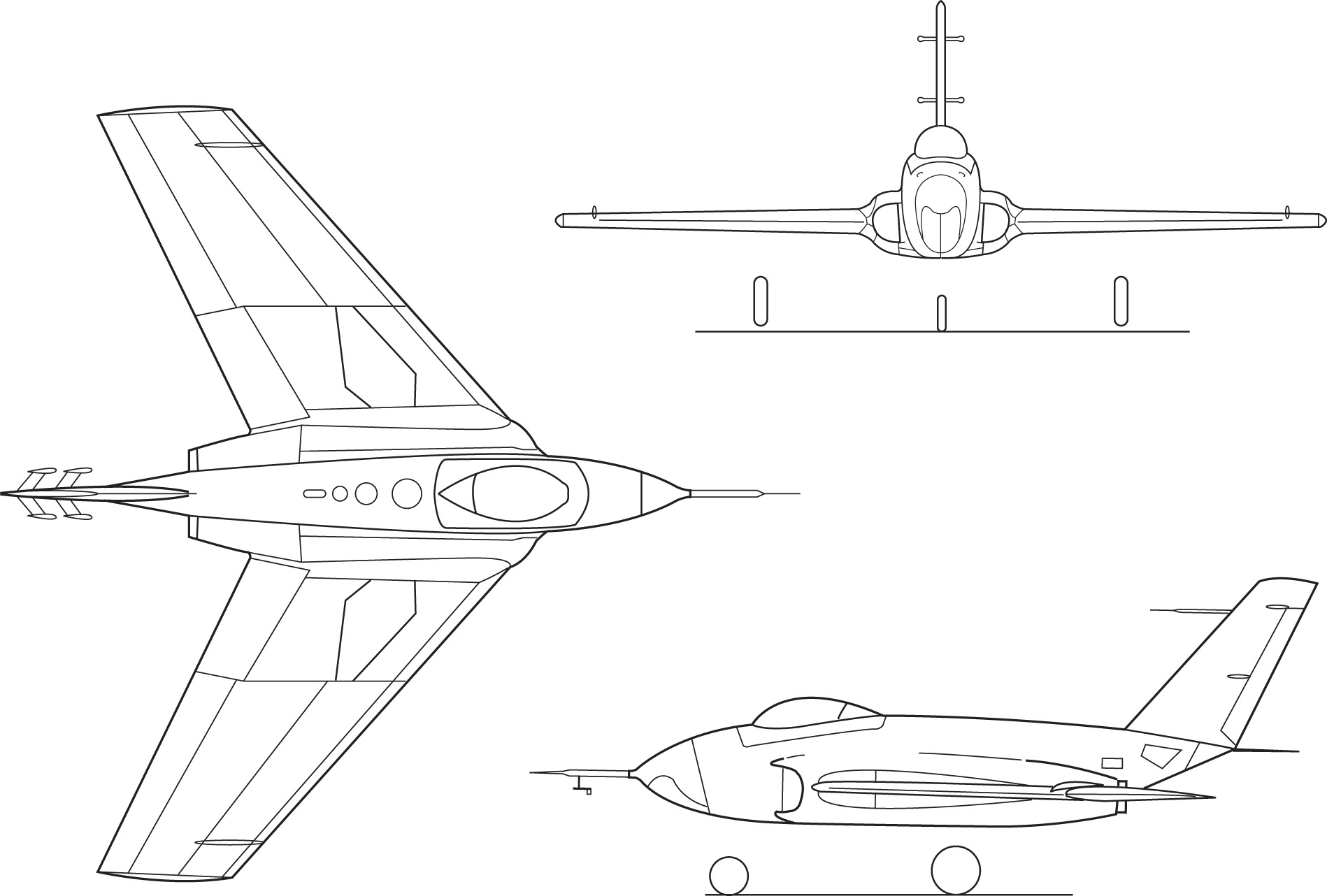

Data from X-4 – The Bantam Explorer

General characteristics

- Crew: 1
- Length: 23 ft 3 in (7.09 m)
- Wingspan: 26 ft 10 in (8.18 m)
- Height: 14 ft 10 in (4.52 m)
- Wing area: 200 sq ft (19 m^{2})
- Airfoil: NACA 0010-64
- Empty weight: 5,507 lb (2,498 kg)
- Max takeoff weight: 7,820 lb (3,547 kg)
- Powerplant: 2 × Westinghouse J30-WE-7 / WE-9 turbojet engines, 1,600 lbf (7.1 kN) thrust each

Performance

- Maximum speed: 625 mph (1,006 km/h, 543 kn)
- Range: 420 mi (680 km, 360 nmi)
- Service ceiling: 42,300 ft (12,900 m)
- Rate of climb: 7,700 ft/min (39 m/s)

== See also ==
Aircraft of comparable role, configuration, and era

- DH.108 Swallow
- Messerschmitt Me 163
- Lippisch P.15

Related lists

- List of X-4 flights
- List of X-planes
