= Douglas D-558-1 Skystreak =

American jet research aircraft in the 1940s

D-558-1 Skystreak
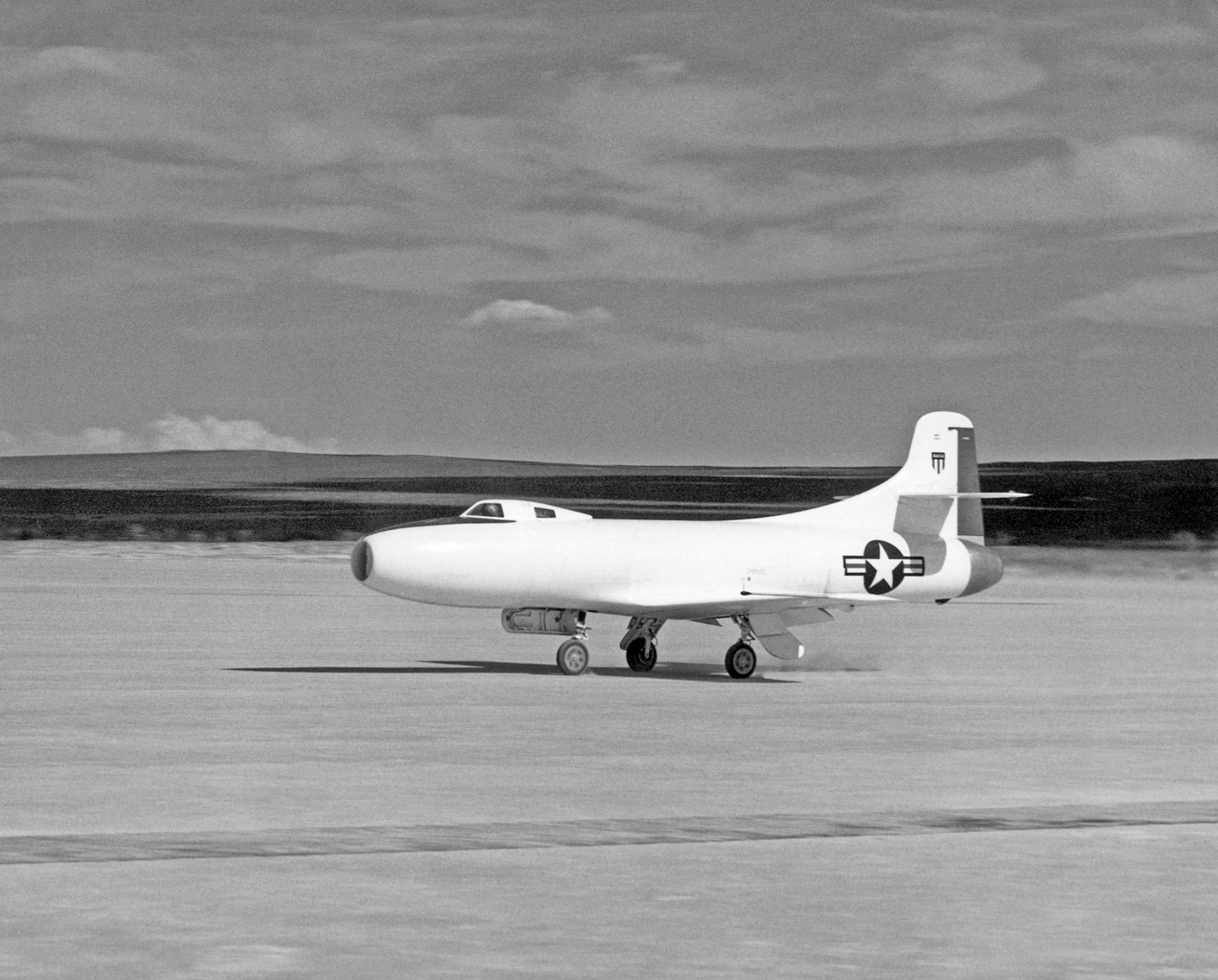

General information
- Type: Experimental aircraft
- National origin: United States
- Manufacturer: Douglas Aircraft Company
- Status: Retired
- Primary user: United States Navy; National Advisory Committee for Aeronautics
- Number built: 3

History
- First flight: 14 April 1947
- Developed into: Douglas D-558-2 Skyrocket

The Douglas Skystreak (D-558-1 or D-558-I) is an American single-engine jet research aircraft of the 1940s. It was designed in 1945 by the Douglas Aircraft Company for the U.S. Navy Bureau of Aeronautics, in conjunction with the National Advisory Committee for Aeronautics (NACA). The Skystreak was a turbojet-powered aircraft that took off from the ground under its own power and had unswept flying surfaces.

== Development ==
The D558 program was conceived as a joint NACA/U.S. Navy research program for transonic and supersonic flight. As originally envisioned, there would be three phases to the D558 program: a jet-powered airplane, a mixed rocket/jet-powered configuration, and a design and mockup of a combat aircraft. A contract for design and construction of six D558-1 aircraft for the first phase was issued on 22 June 1945. The original plan had been for six aircraft with a mixture of nose and side air inlets and varying wing airfoil sections. That plan was quickly reduced to three aircraft of a single configuration with a nose inlet. Plans for the second phase with mixed rocket/jet propulsion were also dropped. Instead, a new aircraft, the D558-2, was designed with mixed rocket and jet propulsion for supersonic flight.

Construction of the first 558-1 began in 1946 and was completed in January 1947. The fuselage used lightweight, high strength HK31 magnesium alloy extensively, while the wings were fabricated from more conventional aluminum alloys. The airframe was designed to withstand unusually high loads of up to 18 times gravity due to the uncertainties of transonic flight. The forward fuselage, including the cockpit, could be jettisoned from the aircraft in an emergency. The aircraft was configured to carry more than 500 pounds (230 kg) of test equipment, including sensors (such as strain gauges and accelerometers) in 400 locations throughout the aircraft. One wing was pierced by 400 small holes for the pressure measurements required for calculating airloads.

The Skystreaks were powered by one Allison J-35-A-11 engine (developed by General Electric as the TG-180) — one of the first axial-flow turbojets of American origin — and carried 230 US gallons (871 L) of jet fuel (kerosene).

== Operational history ==
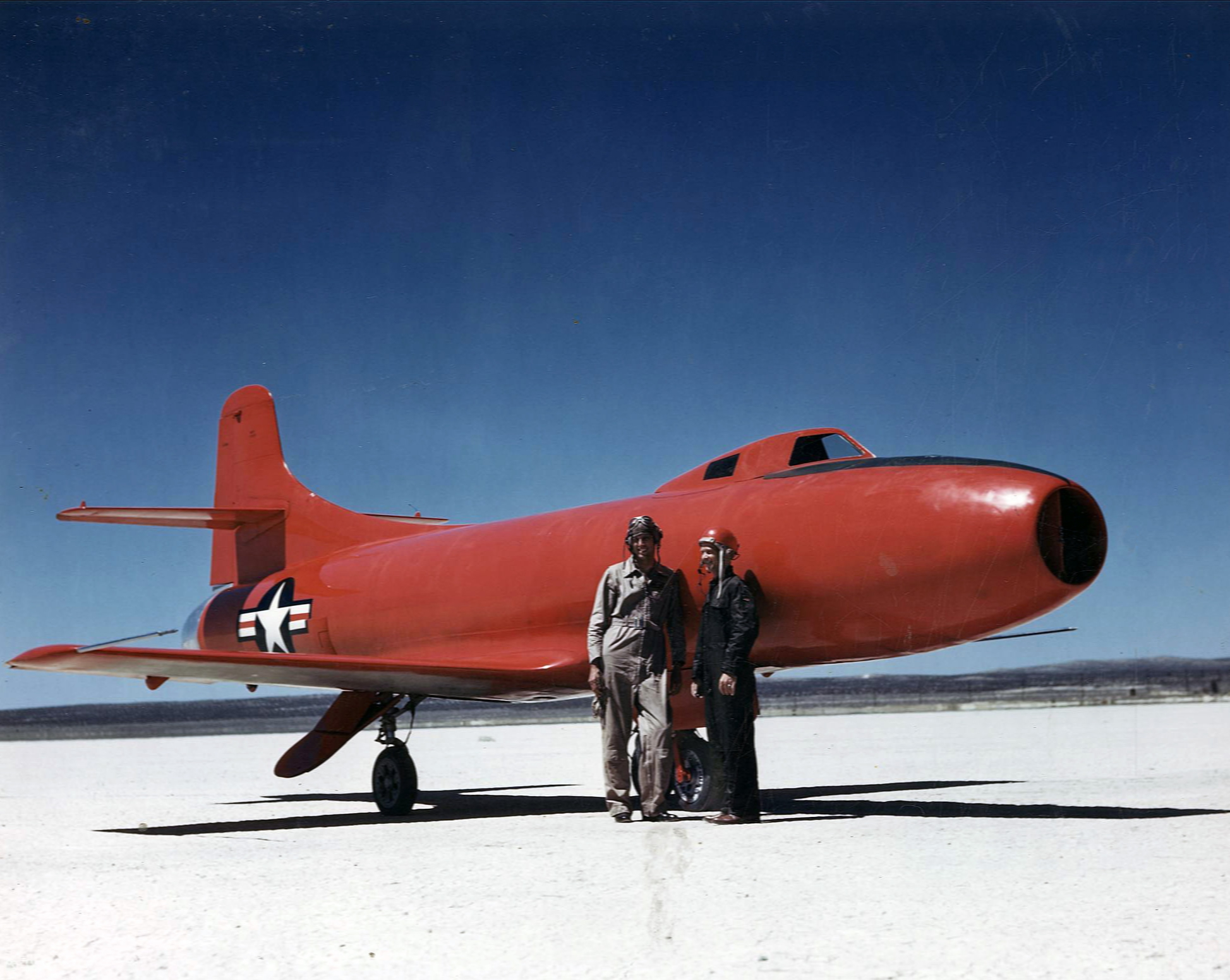
Pilots Carl and Caldwell with a D-558-1 at Muroc, in 1947.

All the Skystreaks were initially painted scarlet, which led to the nickname crimson test tube. NACA later had the color of the Skystreaks changed to white to improve optical tracking and photography. The first of three D-558-1 Skystreaks, BuNo 37970, made its maiden flight on 14 April 1947, at Muroc Army Air Field (later named Edwards AFB). Less than 4 months later, on August 20, this aircraft with Commander Turner Caldwell, USN, reached 640.744 mph (1,031.178 km/h; 556.791 kn) flying D-558-1 #1. This was recognised as an official world air speed record, as the World War II German Me 163B V18 Komet rocket fighter prototype that was claimed to have reached 1,130 km/h (702 mph; 610 kn) in July 1944 did so in secrecy and not under the strict conditions that regulate official records (presence of FIA officials as observers, timed runs in two directions to cancel out wind speed, etc). The D-558-1 #1 Skystreak's record lasted 5 days, and was broken by then-Lieutenant Colonel Marion Carl, USMC, going 10 mph (16 km/h; 8.7 kn) faster in D-558-1 #2, BuNo 37971. This aircraft was delivered to the NACA Muroc Flight Test Unit in April 1949 after 101 flights had been completed by the Navy, Air Force, and Douglas. This aircraft was never flown by the NACA. The D-558-1 #1 is located at the National Naval Aviation Museum at Naval Air Station Pensacola, Florida.

Following 27 flights by the Navy and Douglas the second D-558-1 aircraft was delivered to the NACA in November 1947. The D-558-1 #2 underwent extensive instrumentation by the NACA Muroc instrumentation section. The number 2 Skystreak made a total of 19 flights with the NACA before it crashed on takeoff due to compressor disintegration on May 3, 1948, killing NACA pilot Howard C. Lilly. The third D-558-I, BuNo 37972, aircraft was delivered to the NACA Muroc Flight Test Unit in 1949 after three Douglas test pilots and Howard Lilly had flown it. The number three aircraft took over the planned flight program of the D-558-1 #2. From the first flight in 1949 through 1953 the third Skystreak was flown in an intensive flight-research program by seven NACA test pilots, with a great deal of useful data collected on high-subsonic handling. The D-558-1 #3 made a total of 78 research flights with the NACA before being retired on June 10, 1953. The third Skystreak is on display at Carolinas Aviation Museum located at the Charlotte-Douglas International Airport (CLT) in Charlotte, North Carolina.

The Skystreak reached Mach 0.99 in level flight, but only flew supersonic in a dive. In the public mind, much of the research performed by the D-558-1 Skystreaks was quickly overshadowed by Chuck Yeager and the supersonic Bell X-1 rocket plane. However, the Skystreak performed an important role in aeronautical research by flying for extended periods of time at transonic speeds, which freed the X-1 to fly for limited periods at supersonic speeds.

=== Aircraft Bureau Numbers (BuNo) and status ===
- D-558-1 Skystreak
  - D-558-1 #1 - BuNo 37970 NACA-140, 101 flights (retired to National Naval Aviation Museum, NAS Pensacola, Florida)
  - D-558-1 #2 - BuNo 37971 NACA-141, 46 flights (destroyed in crash, 3 May 1948)
  - D-558-1 #3 - BuNo 37972 NACA-142, 81 flights (retired to Carolinas Aviation Museum, Charlotte-Douglas International Airport, Charlotte, North Carolina)
  - D-558-1 #4, #5, #6 Additional aircraft originally ordered but later cancelled.

== Specifications (D-558-1 Skystreak) ==
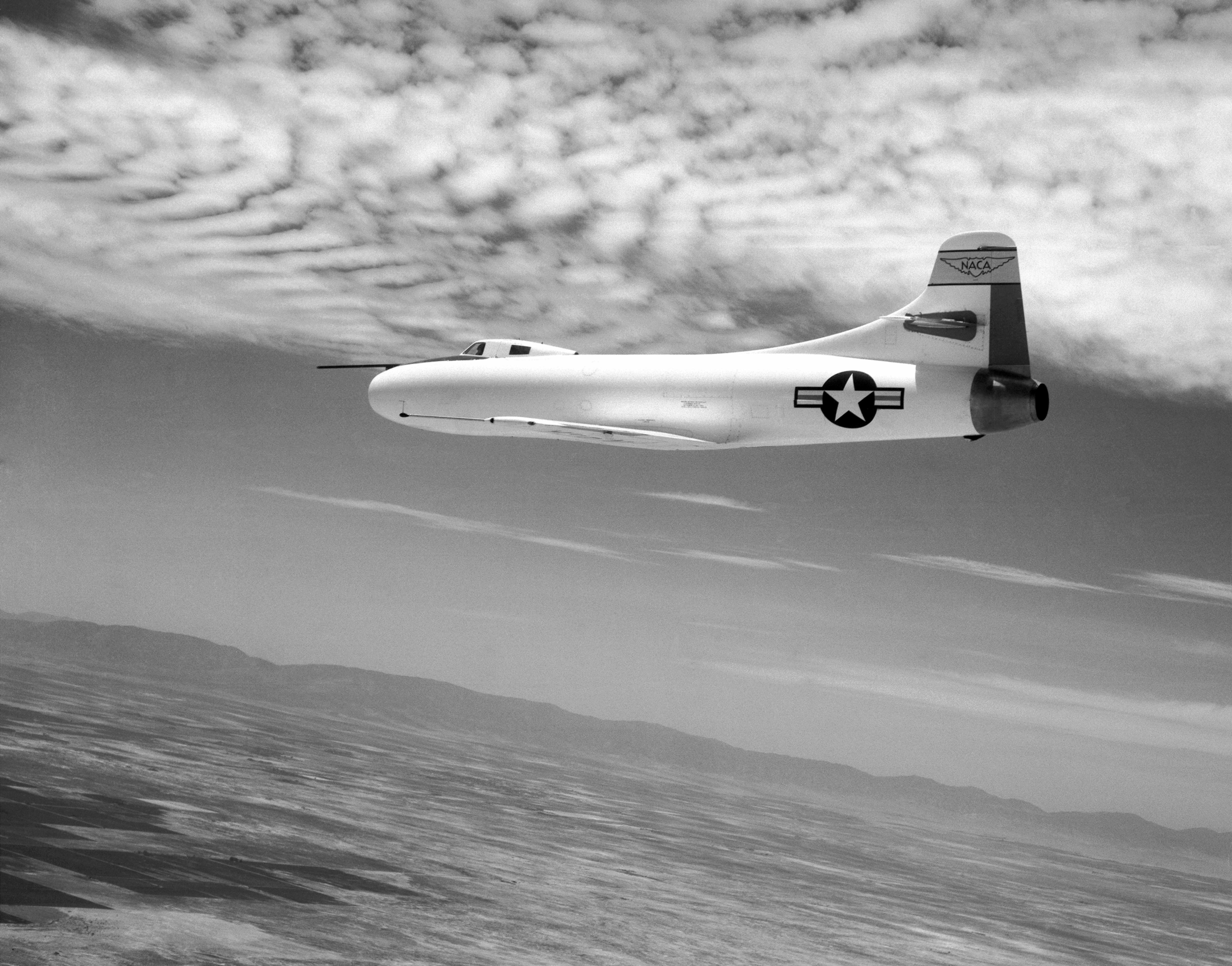
D-558-1 in flight

Data from McDonnell Douglas aircraft since 1920 : Volume I, Jane's all the World's Aircraft 1949-50

General characteristics

- Crew: 1
- Capacity: 500 lb (230 kg) of instrumentation
- Length: 35 ft 8.5 in (10.884 m)
- Wingspan: 25 ft 0 in (7.62 m)
- Height: 12 ft 11.6875 in (3.954 m)
- Wing area: 150.7 sq ft (14.00 m^{2})
- Airfoil: NACA 65-110
- Gross weight: 9,750 lb (4,423 kg)
- Max takeoff weight: 10,105 lb (4,584 kg)
- Fuel capacity: 230 US gal (190 imp gal; 870 L) + optional 50 US gal (42 imp gal; 190 L) jettisonable tip-tanks
- Powerplant: 1 × Allison J35-A-11 turbojet engine, 5,000 lbf (22 kN) thrust

Performance

- Maximum speed: 651 mph (1,048 km/h, 566 kn) at sea level
- g limits: +11 (ultimate)
- Wing loading: 64.7 lb/sq ft (316 kg/m^{2})
- Thrust/weight: 0.51

== See also ==
Related development

- D-558-2 Skyrocket

Aircraft of comparable role, configuration, and era

- Bell X-1
- Bell X-5
- Convair XF-92
- Northrop X-4 Bantam

Related lists

- List of experimental aircraft
