= Aerodynamic heating =

Higher temperatures due to movement through air

Aerodynamic heating is the heating of a solid body produced by its high-speed passage through air. In science and engineering, an understanding of aerodynamic heating is necessary for predicting the behaviour of meteoroids which enter the Earth's atmosphere, to ensure spacecraft safely survive atmospheric reentry, and for the design of high-speed aircraft and missiles.

"For high speed aircraft and missiles aerodynamic heating is the conversion of kinetic energy into heat energy as a result of their relative motion in stationary air and the subsequent transfer through the skin into the structure and interior of the vehicle. Some heat is produced by fluid compression at and near stagnation points such as the vehicle nose and wing leading edges. Additional heat is generated from air friction along the skin inside the boundary layer". These two regions of skin heating are shown by van Driest. Boundary layer heating of the skin may be known as kinetic heating.

== The effect of skin heating on aircraft wing design ==
Concorde skin temperatures caused by air coming to rest, from an ambient temperature of -57 degC, at the nose and wing leading edges and from the temperature from friction in the boundary layer rearwards.

The effects of aerodynamic heating on the temperature of the skin, and subsequent heat transfer into the structure, the cabin, the equipment bays and the electrical, hydraulic and fuel systems, have to be incorporated in the design of supersonic and hypersonic aircraft and missiles.

One of the main concerns caused by aerodynamic heating arises in the design of the wing. For subsonic speeds, two main goals of wing design are minimizing weight and maximizing strength. Aerodynamic heating, which occurs at supersonic and hypersonic speeds, adds an additional consideration in wing structure analysis. An idealized wing structure is made up of spars, stringers, and skin segments. In a wing that normally experiences subsonic speeds, there must be a sufficient number of stringers to withstand the axial and bending stresses induced by the lift force acting on the wing. In addition, the distance between the stringers must be small enough that the skin panels do not buckle, and the panels must be thick enough to withstand the shear stress and shear flow present in the panels due to the lifting force on the wing. However, the weight of the wing must be made as small as possible, so the choice of material for the stringers and the skin is an important factor.

At supersonic speeds, aerodynamic heating adds another element to this structural analysis. At normal speeds, spars and stringers experience a load which is a function of the lift force, first and second moments of inertia, and length of the spar. When there are more spars and stringers, the load in each member is reduced, and the area of the stringer can be reduced to meet critical stress requirements. However, the increase in temperature caused by energy flowing from the air (heated by skin friction at these high speeds) adds another load factor, called a thermal load, to the spars. This thermal load increases the force felt by the stringers, and thus the area of the stringers must be increased in order for the critical stress requirement to be met.

Another issue that aerodynamic heating causes for aircraft design is the effect of high temperatures on common material properties. Common materials used in aircraft wing design, such as aluminum and steel, experience a decrease in strength as temperatures get extremely high. The Young's Modulus of the material, defined as the ratio between stress and strain experienced by the material, decreases as the temperature increases. Young's Modulus is critical in the selection of materials for wing, as a higher value lets the material resist the yield and shear stress caused by the lift and thermal loads. This is because Young's Modulus is an important factor in the equations for calculating the critical buckling load for axial members and the critical buckling shear stress for skin panels. If the Young's Modulus of the material decreases at high temperatures caused by aerodynamic heating, then the wing design will call for larger spars and thicker skin segments in order to account for this decrease in strength as the aircraft goes supersonic. There are some materials that retain their strength at the high temperatures that aerodynamic heating induces. For example, Inconel X-750 was used on parts of the airframe of the X-15, a North American aircraft that flew at hypersonic speeds in 1958. Titanium is another high-strength material, even at high temperatures, and is often used for wing frames of supersonic aircraft. The SR-71 used titanium skin panels painted black to reduce the temperature and corrugated to accommodate expansion. Another important design concept for early supersonic aircraft wings was using a small thickness-to-chord ratio, so that the speed of the flow over the airfoil does not increase too much from the free stream speed. As the flow is already supersonic, increasing the speed even more would not be beneficial for the wing structure. Reducing the thickness of the wing brings the top and bottom stringers closer together, reducing the total moment of inertia of the structure. This increases axial load in the stringers, and thus the area, and weight, of the stringers must be increased. Some designs for hypersonic missiles have used liquid cooling of the leading edges (usually the fuel en route to the engine). The Sprint missile's heat shield needed several design iterations for Mach 10 temperatures.

== Reentry vehicles ==
Heating caused by the very high reentry speeds (greater than Mach 20) is sufficient to destroy the vehicle unless special techniques are used. The early space capsules such as used on Mercury, Gemini, and Apollo were given blunt shapes to produce a stand-off bow shock, allowing most of the heat to dissipate into the surrounding air. Additionally, these vehicles had ablative material that sublimates into a gas at high temperature. The act of sublimation absorbs the thermal energy from the aerodynamic heating and erodes the material rather than heating the capsule. The surface of the heat shield for the Mercury spacecraft had a coating of aluminium with glassfiber in many layers. As the temperature rose to 1,100 °C (1,400 K) the layers would evaporate and take the heat with it. The spacecraft would become hot but not harmfully so. The Space Shuttle used insulating tiles on its lower surface to absorb and radiate heat while preventing conduction to the aluminium airframe. Damage to the heat shield during liftoff of Space Shuttle Columbia contributed to its destruction upon reentry.

== See also ==
- Thermal velocity
