= Bell X-1 =

Experimental rocket-powered aircraft

X-1
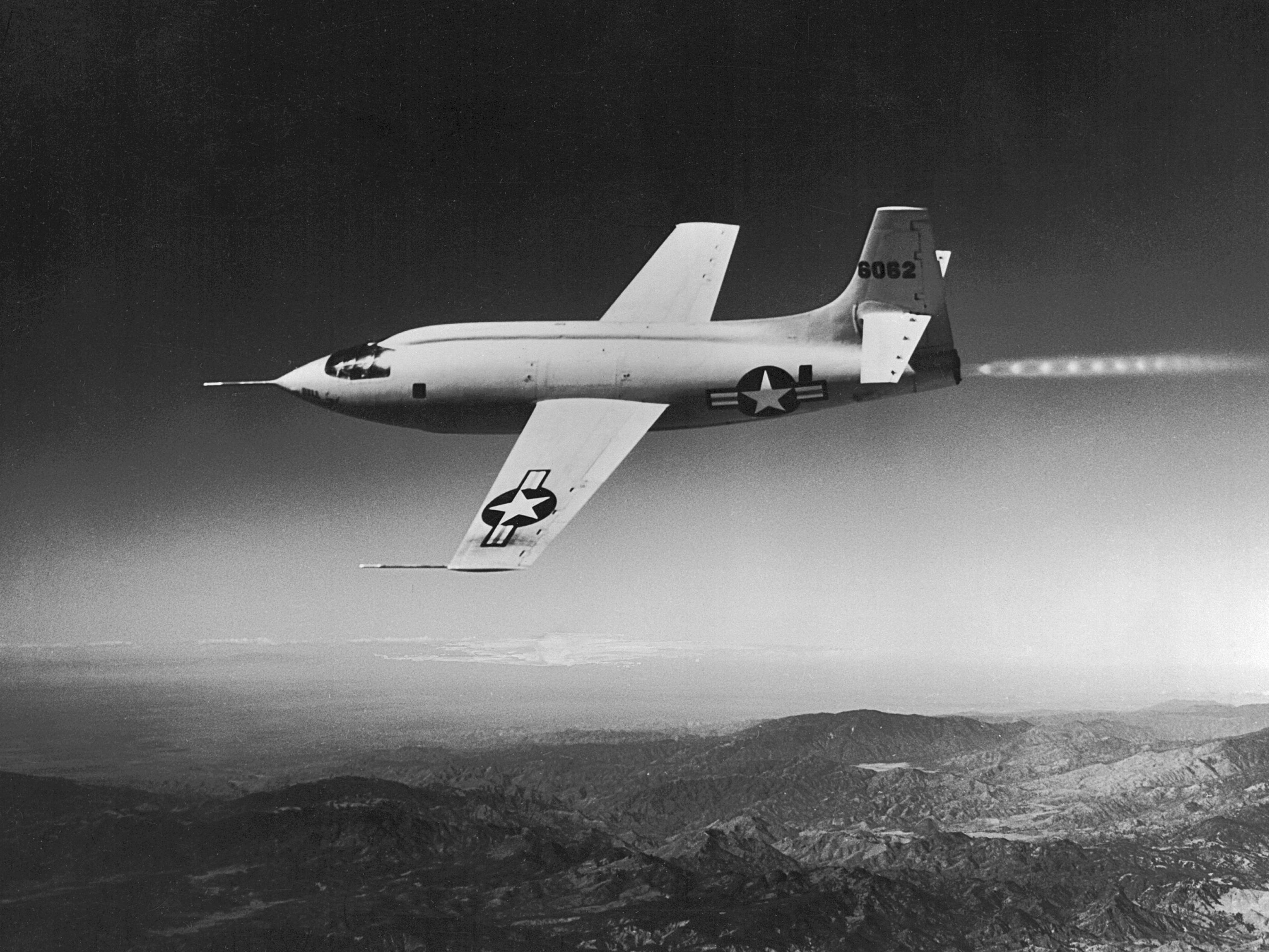
- X-1 #46-062, nicknamed Glamorous Glennis

General information
- Type: Experimental rocket plane
- National origin: United States
- Manufacturer: Bell Aircraft
- Status: Retired
- Primary users: United States Air Force National Advisory Committee for Aeronautics
- Number built: 7

History
- First flight: 19 January 1946

The Bell X-1 (Bell Model 44) is a rocket engine–powered aircraft, designated originally as the XS-1, and was a joint National Advisory Committee for Aeronautics–U.S. Army Air Forces–U.S. Air Force supersonic research project built by Bell Aircraft. Conceived during 1944 and designed and built in 1945, it achieved a speed of nearly 1,000 miles per hour (1,600 km/h; 870 kn) in 1948. A derivative of this same design, the Bell X-1A, having greater fuel capacity and hence longer rocket burning time, exceeded 1,600 miles per hour (2,600 km/h; 1,400 kn) in 1954. The X-1 aircraft #46-062, nicknamed Glamorous Glennis and flown by Chuck Yeager, was the first piloted airplane to exceed the speed of sound in level flight and was the first of the X-planes, a series of American experimental rocket planes (and non-rocket planes) designed for testing new technologies.

== Design and development ==
=== Parallel development ===
In 1942, the United Kingdom's Ministry of Aviation began a top secret project with Miles Aircraft to develop the world's first aircraft capable of breaking the sound barrier. The project resulted in the design of the turbojet-powered Miles M.52, with a maximum speed of 1,000 miles per hour (870 kn; 1,600 km/h) (almost twice the existing airspeed record) in level flight, and able to climb to an altitude of 36,000 ft (11,000 m) in 1 minute and 30 seconds. The fuselage was shaped like a bullet, it had thin wings and a slab tailplane for controlled flight at the speed of sound and beyond. Miles' chief aerodynamicist, Dennis Bancroft, was interviewed many years later in 1997 on his reason for needing an all-moving tailplane in his 1944 design.

DENNIS BANCROFT: We thought the ordinary controls wouldn't work above the speed of sound. So, we had to make an all-moving tail plane, because an ordinary elevator would literally not function at all. We would go up to the speed of sound, lose all air control, and the aircraft would crash.

In 1944, Miles was told to go ahead with the construction of three prototypes. In February 1946, with a first flight expected in the summer of 1946, the M52 was cancelled. In place of the manned full-scale M.52 it was decided to test 3/10 scale models of the aircraft, rocket propelled, dropped from an aircraft, and controlled by an autopilot. On the 10th of October 1948, a model achieved Mach 1.38 (1,690 km/h; 1,050 mph) in level flight.

STACY KEACH (NARRATOR): One year after the X-1's historic flight, Britain broke the sound barrier with a one-third scale model of the M-52. Although unmanned and radio-controlled, it did finally vindicate the worthiness of its supersonic design.

The Bell XS-1 would have a conventional horizontal tail-plane but with trimming available on the stabilizer. It would be required for pitch control when a shockwave was preventing a deflected elevator from altering the pressure distribution and pitching force on the tailplane.

In September 1946, a DH 108 tail-less jet aircraft was practicing for an attempt on the world speed record when it experienced violent pitching oscillations at Mach 0.875 and broke up. The Bell XS-1 would have a conventional horizontal tail which provides pitch damping not present in a tail-less aircraft.

=== Research studies ===
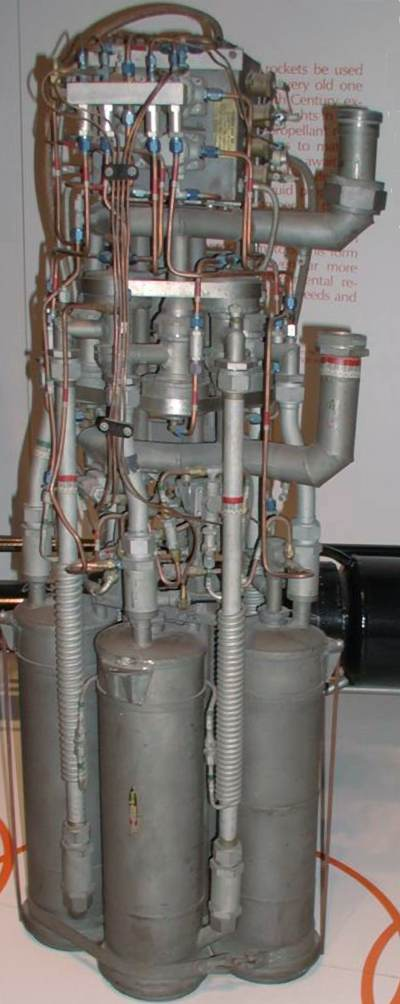
XLR-11 rocket engine

The XS-1 was first discussed in December 1944. Early specifications for the aircraft were for a piloted supersonic vehicle that could fly at 800 miles per hour (1,300 km/h) at 35,000 feet (11,000 m) for two to five minutes. On 16 March 1945, the U.S. Army Air Forces Flight Test Division and the National Advisory Committee for Aeronautics (NACA) contracted with the Bell Aircraft Company to build three XS-1 (for "Experimental, Supersonic", later X-1) aircraft to obtain flight data on conditions in the transonic speed range.

Bell built a rocket plane after considering the turbojet alternative. Turbojets could not achieve the required performance at high altitude. An aircraft with both turbojet and rocket engines would be too large and complex. The X-1 was, in principle, a "bullet with wings", its shape closely resembling a Browning .50-caliber (12.7 mm) machine gun bullet, known to be stable in supersonic flight. The shape was followed to the extent of seating its pilot behind a sloped, framed window inside a confined cockpit in the nose, with no ejection seat.

For the design of the XS-1 the many unknowns relating to transonic and supersonic flight meant seeking every available source of information from governmental agencies, powerplant manufacturers and research institutions. Foreign information became available in early 1946, shortly after the first glide test of the XS-1 in Jan 1946, when the British Ministry of Supply cancelled the Miles M.52 and ordered all research reports and other information be sent to Bell Aircraft.

Bell Aircraft aerodynamicists working with NACA laboratories predicted significant longitudinal trim changes during transonic flight. John Stack and Robert Gilruth at NACA recommended that Bell mount the elevator on an adjustable horizontal stabilizer. Bell incorporated the stabilizer with rapid adjustment in pitch to accommodate large changes of trim. A contractor test flight by Tex Johnston showed an unacceptable lost motion between the pilot's input to the horizontal stabilizer and the stabilizer actuator which was corrected before the XS-1 was handed over for the high speed research program. The whole tailplane could be moved or just the elevator at fixed stabilizer settings. It was placed as high as possible above the wing wake with a thinner section than for the wing to separate the high drag rise from the wing from compressibility effects on the tail. Initially, as increases in speed were made in small steps towards possibly unknown control difficulties the horizontal stabilizer was left at its pre-launch angle set on the ground as there was concern that adjusting it at high speed would cause severe control problems. Nevertheless, in October 1947, when test pilot Yeager ran out of elevator authority (no pitch control) at Mach 0.94 it took the test team by surprise until they realized that extra control was available by moving the horizontal stabilizer. The tailplane trim setting had to be accurately set on the ground to ensure a controlled drop at the beginning of a flight. Scott Crossfield relates an inadvertent one-degree error flipping the X-1 on its back after being dropped from the mother plane. The tailplane configuration was carried over to the X-1A series. All subsequent supersonic aircraft would either have an all-moving tailplane or be "tailless" delta winged types.

Swept wings were not used because too little was known about them. As the design might lead to a fighter, the XS-1 was intended to take off from the ground, but the end of the war made the B-29 Superfortress available to carry it into the air.

The rocket engine was a four-chamber design built by Reaction Motors Inc., one of the first companies to build liquid-propellant rocket engines in the U.S. After considering hydrogen peroxide monopropellant, aniline/nitric acid bipropellant, and nitromethane monopropellant as fuels, the rocket burned ethyl alcohol diluted with water with a liquid oxygen oxidizer. Its four chambers could be individually turned on and off, so thrust could be changed in 1,500 lbf (6,700 N) increments. The fuel and oxygen tanks for the first two X-1 engines were pressurized with nitrogen, reducing flight time by about 1 1/2 minutes and increasing landing weight by 2,000 pounds (910 kg), but the rest used gas-driven turbopumps, increasing the chamber pressure and thrust while making the engine lighter.

== Operational history ==
Bell Aircraft chief test pilot Jack Woolams became the first person to fly the XS-1. He made a glide-flight over Pinecastle Army Airfield, in Florida, on 19 January 1946. Woolams completed nine more glide-flights over Pinecastle, with the B-29 dropping the aircraft at 29,000 feet (8,800 m) and the XS-1 landing 12 minutes later at about 110 miles per hour (180 km/h). In March 1946 the #1 rocket plane was returned to Bell Aircraft in Niagara Falls, New York for modifications to prepare for the powered flight tests. Four more glide tests occurred at Muroc Army Air Field near Palmdale, California, which had been flooded during the Florida tests, before the first powered test on 9 December 1946. Two chambers were ignited, but the aircraft accelerated so quickly that one chamber was turned off until reignition at 35,000 feet (11,000 m), reaching Mach 0.795. After the chambers were turned off the aircraft descended to 15,000 feet (4,600 m), where all four chambers were briefly tested.

After Woolams died while practicing for the National Air Races in August 1946, Chalmers "Slick" Goodlin was assigned as the primary Bell Aircraft test pilot for the X-1. Goodlin made the first powered flight on 9 December 1946. Tex Johnston, Bell's chief test pilot and program supervisor, made a test flight on 22 May 1947, after complaints about the slow progress of flight tests. According to Johnston, "The contract with the Air Corps defined the tests by Bell as onboard systems verification, handling characteristics evaluation, stability and control, and performance testing to Mach 0.99." After Johnston's initial flight at Mach 0.72, he thought the airplane was ready for supersonic flights, after the longitudinal trim system was fixed, and three more test flights.

The Army Air Force was unhappy with the cautious pace of flight envelope expansion and Bell Aircraft's flight test contract for airplane #46-062 was terminated. The test program was acquired by the Army Air Force Flight Test Division on 24 June after months of negotiation. Goodlin had demanded a US$150,000 bonus (equivalent to $2.16 million in 2025) for exceeding the speed of sound. Flight tests of the X-1-2 (serial 46-063) would be conducted by NACA to provide design data for later production high-performance aircraft.

=== Mach 1 flight ===
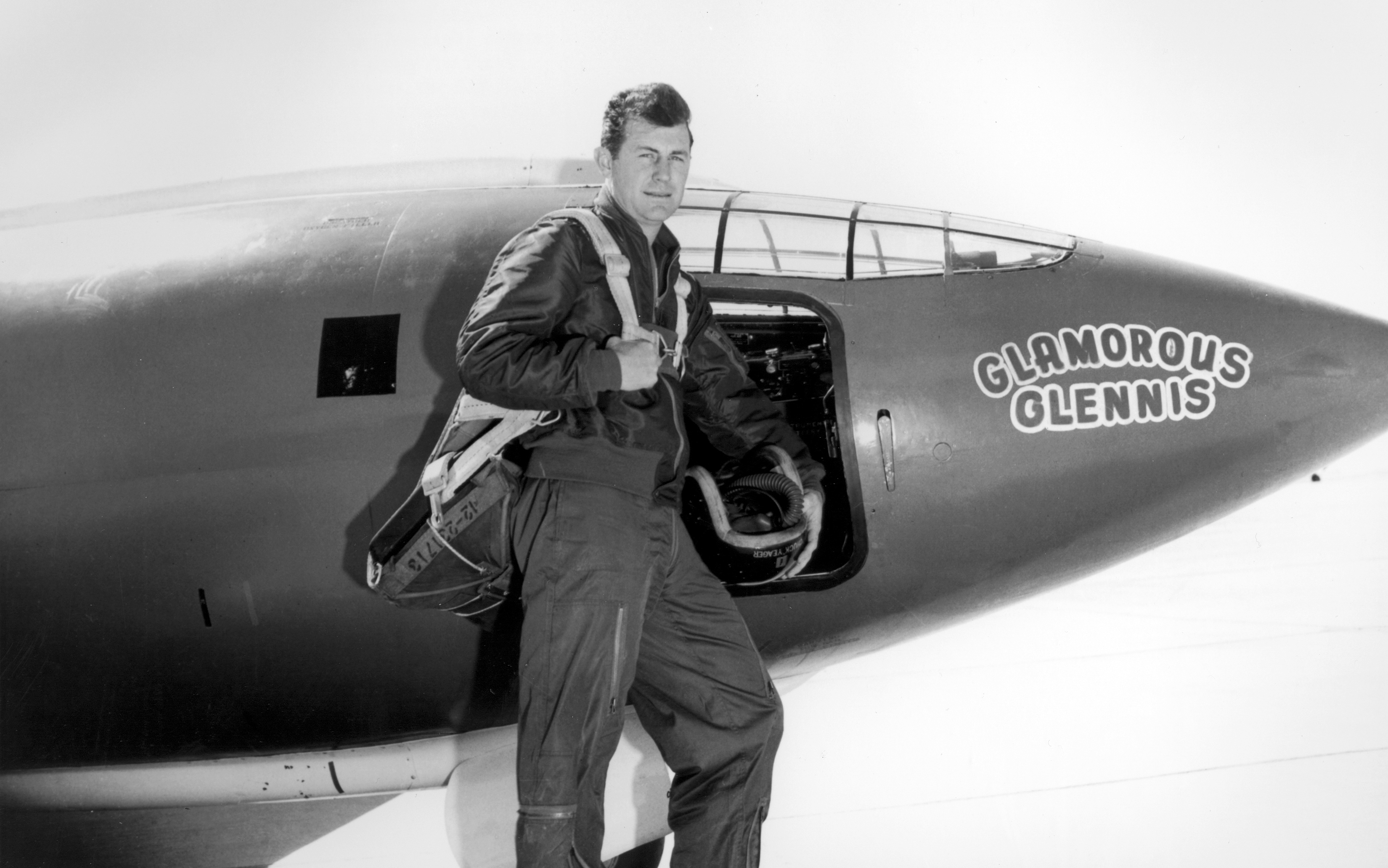
Chuck Yeager in front of the XS-1-1 that he nicknamed the Glamorous Glennis.

The first manned supersonic flight occurred on 14 October 1947, over the Mojave Desert in California, less than a month after the U.S. Air Force had been created as a separate service. Captain Charles "Chuck" Yeager piloted USAF aircraft #46-062, nicknamed Glamorous Glennis for his wife. The airplane was drop launched from the bomb bay of a B-29 and reached Mach 1.06 (700 miles per hour; 1,100 km/h; 610 kn). Following burnout of the engine, the plane glided to a landing on the dry lake bed. This was XS-1 flight number 50.

"Breaking the Sound Barrier" (1947) Official USAF Bell X-1 promotional film reel.

The three main participants in the X-1 program won the National Aeronautics Association Collier Trophy in 1948 for their efforts. Honored at the White House by President Truman were Larry Bell for Bell Aircraft, Captain Yeager for piloting the flights, and John Stack for the contributions from NACA.

The story of Yeager's 14 October flight was leaked to a reporter from the magazine Aviation Week, and the Los Angeles Times featured the story as headline news in their 22 December issue. The magazine story was released on 20 December. The Air Force threatened legal action against the journalists who revealed the story, but none ever occurred. The news of a straight-wing supersonic aircraft surprised many American experts, who like their German counterparts during the war believed that a swept-wing design was necessary to break the sound barrier. On 10 June 1948, Air Force Secretary Stuart Symington announced that the sound barrier had been repeatedly broken by two experimental airplanes.

On 5 January 1949, Yeager used Aircraft #46-062 to perform the only conventional (runway) launch of the X-1 program, attaining 23,000 ft (7,000 m) in 90 seconds.

=== Legacy ===
In 1997, the United States Postal Service issued a fiftieth anniversary commemorative stamp recognizing the Bell X1-6062 aircraft as the first aeronautical vehicle to fly at supersonic speed of approximately Mach 1.06 (1,299 km/h; 806.9 mph).

The Bell X-1 is also the subject of a toy version in the Arthur episode "Arthur's Big Hit". In that episode, Arthur's sister D.W. tries to let it fly out the window, but it ends up falling to the ground and breaking. This resulted in a moment in which Arthur clenches his fist and punches D.W.; this moment has since become a popular meme.

== Variants ==
Later variants of the X-1 were built to test different aspects of supersonic flight; one of these, the X-1A, with Yeager at the controls, inadvertently demonstrated a very dangerous characteristic of fast (Mach 2 plus) supersonic flight: inertia coupling. Only Yeager's skills as an aviator prevented disaster; later Mel Apt would lose his life testing the Bell X-2 under similar circumstances.

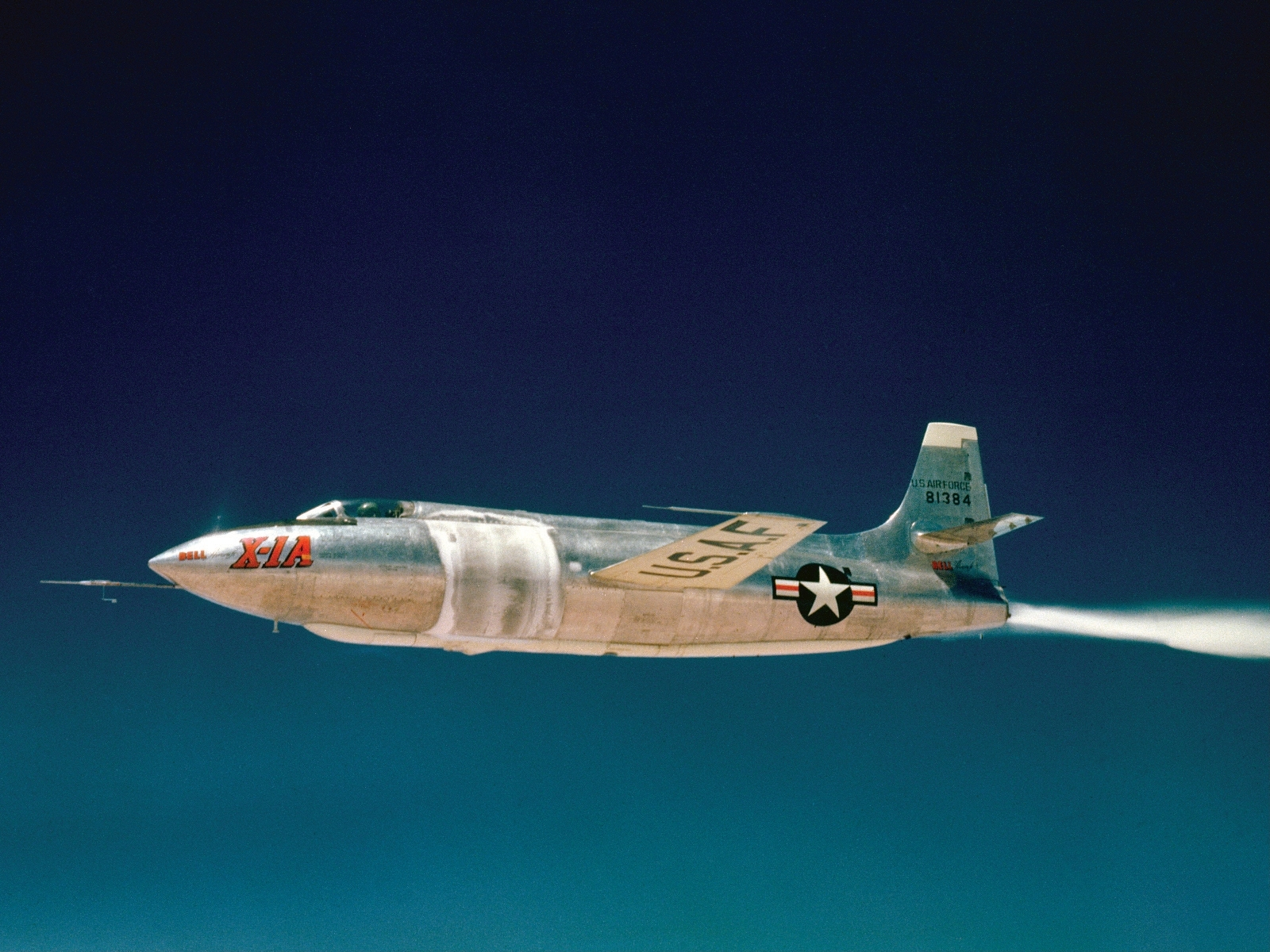
X-1A in flight

=== X-1A ===
(Bell Model 58A)

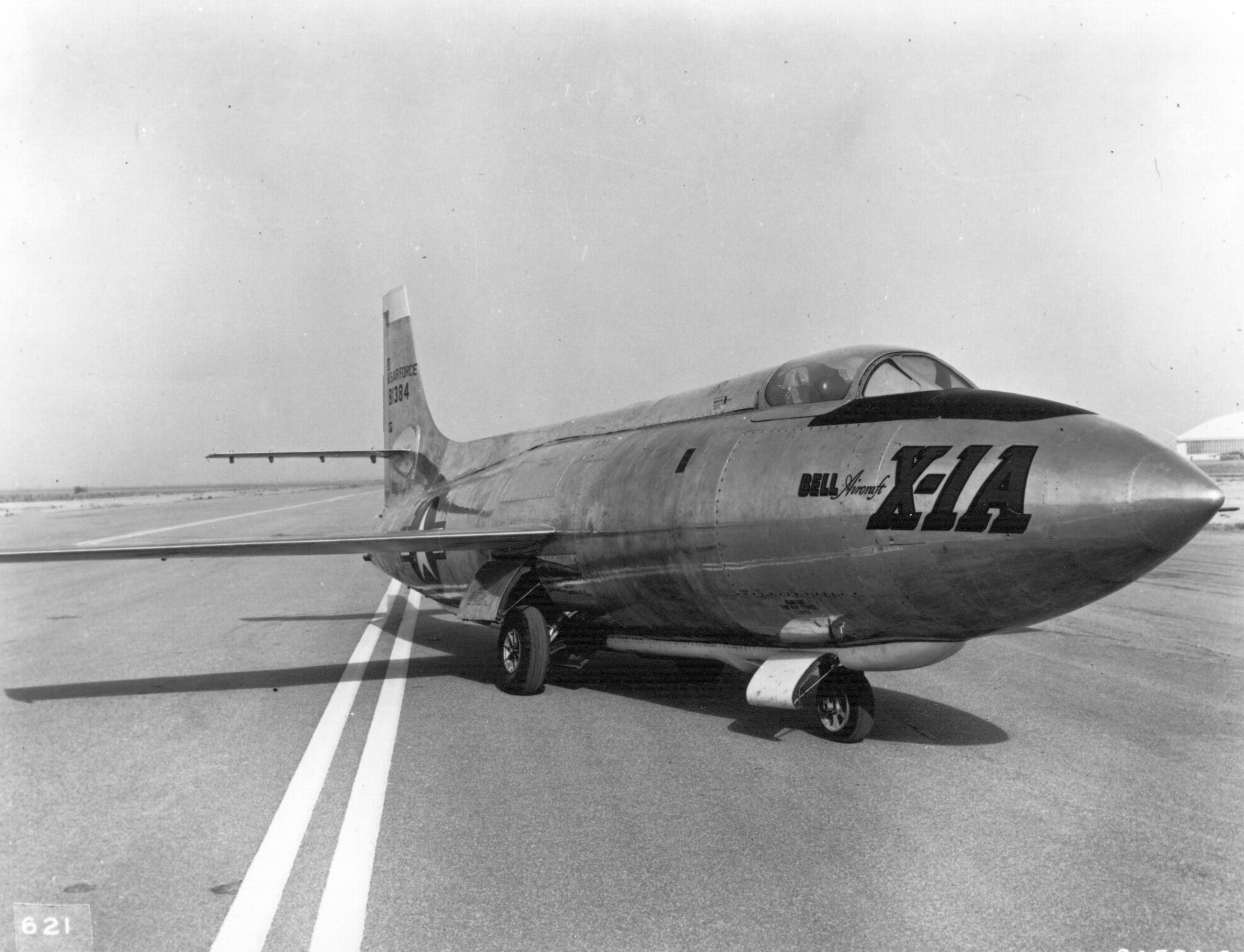
X-1A

Ordered by the Air Force on 2 April 1948, the X-1A (serial number 48-1384) was intended to investigate aerodynamic phenomena at speeds greater than Mach 2 (2,200 km/h; 1,300 mph) and altitudes greater than 90,000 ft (27 km), specifically emphasizing dynamic stability and air loads. Longer and heavier than the original X-1, with a stepped canopy for better vision, the X-1A was powered by the same Reaction Motors XLR-11 rocket engine. The aircraft first flew, unpowered, on 14 February 1953 at Edwards AFB, with the first powered flight on 21 February. Both flights were piloted by Bell test pilot Jean "Skip" Ziegler.

After NACA started its high-speed testing with the Douglas Skyrocket, culminating in Scott Crossfield achieving Mach 2.005 on 20 November 1953, the Air Force started a series of tests with the X-1A, which the test pilot of the series, Chuck Yeager, named "Operation NACA Weep". These culminated on 12 December 1953, when Yeager achieved an altitude of 74,700 feet (22,800 m) and a new airspeed record of Mach 2.44 (2,610 km/h; 1,620 mph). Unlike Crossfield in the Skyrocket, Yeager achieved that in level flight. Soon afterwards, the aircraft spun out of control, due to the then not yet understood phenomenon of inertia coupling. The X-1A dropped from maximum altitude to 25,000 feet (7,600 m), exposing the pilot to accelerations of as much as 8 g, during which Yeager broke the canopy with his helmet before regaining control.

On 28 May 1954, Maj. Arthur W. Murray piloted the X-1A to a new record of 90,440 feet (27,570 m).

The aircraft was transferred to NACA during September 1954, and subsequently modified. The X-1A was lost on 8 August 1955, when, while being prepared for launch from the RB-50 mothership, an explosion ruptured the plane's liquid oxygen tank. With the help of crewmembers on the RB-50, test pilot Joseph A. Walker successfully extricated himself from the plane, which was then jettisoned. Exploding on impact with the desert floor, the X-1A became the first of many early X-planes that would be lost to explosions.

=== X-1B ===
(Bell Model 58B)

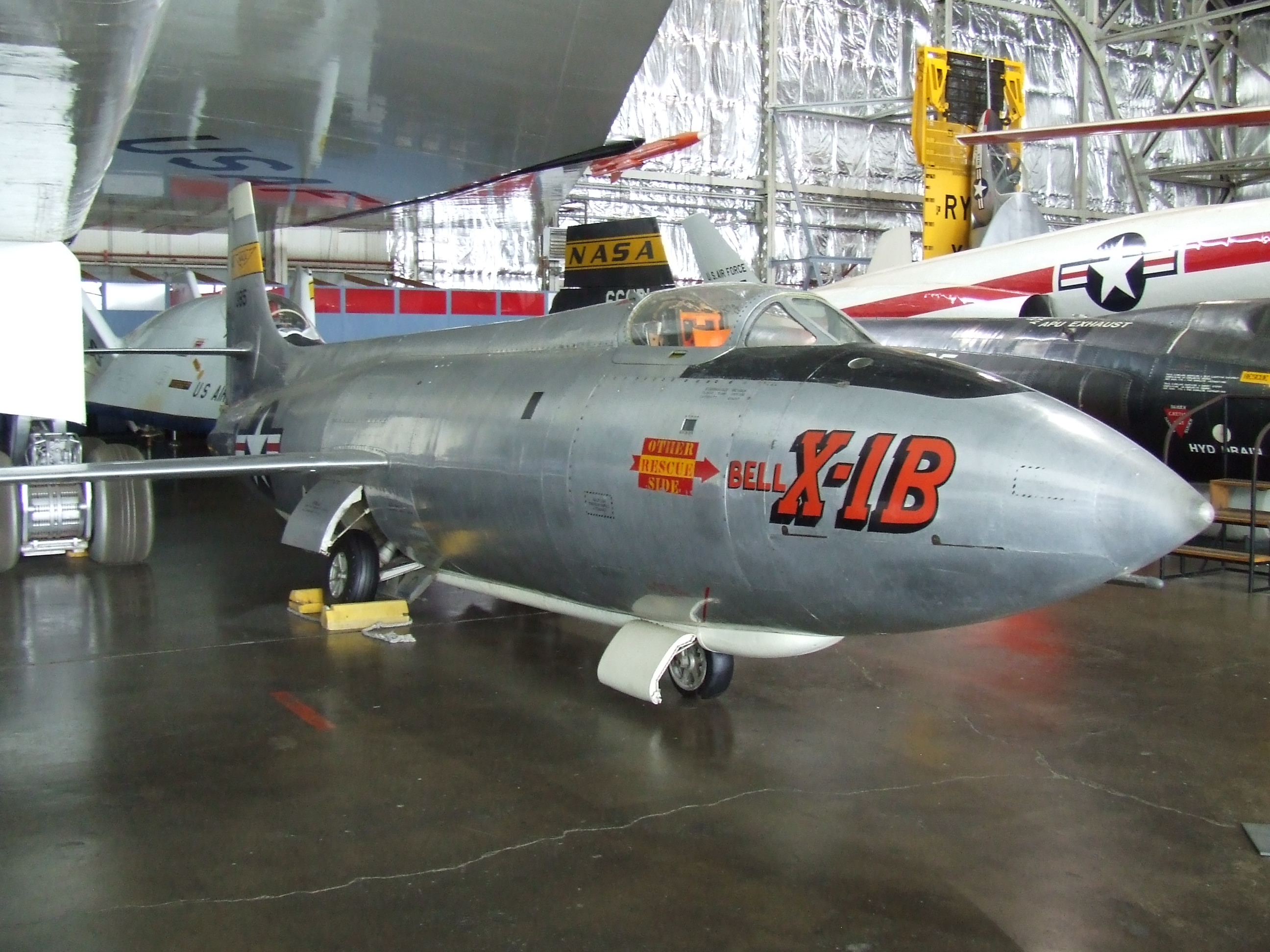
X-1B at the National Museum of the United States Air Force

The X-1B (serial 48-1385) was equipped with aerodynamic heating instrumentation for thermal research (more than 300 thermal probes were installed on its surface). It was similar to the X-1A except for having a slightly different wing. The X-1B was used for high-speed research by the U.S. Air Force starting from October 1954, prior to being transferred to NACA during January 1955. NACA continued to fly the aircraft until January 1958, when cracks in the fuel tanks forced its grounding. The X-1B completed a total of 27 flights. A notable achievement was the installation of a system of small reaction rockets used for directional control, making the X-1B the first aircraft to fly with this sophisticated control system, later used in the North American X-15. The X-1B is now at the National Museum of the United States Air Force, Wright-Patterson Air Force Base at Dayton, Ohio, where it is displayed in the museum's Maj. Gen. Albert Boyd and Maj. Gen. Fred Ascani Research and Development Gallery.

=== X-1C ===
(Bell Model 58C) The X-1C (serial 48-1387) was intended to test armaments and munitions in the high transonic and supersonic flight regimes. It was canceled while still in the mockup stage, as the development of transonic and supersonic-capable aircraft like the North American F-86 Sabre and the North American F-100 Super Sabre eliminated the need for a dedicated experimental test vehicle.

=== X-1D ===
(Bell Model 58D) The X-1D (serial 48-1386) was the first of the second generation of supersonic rocket planes. Flown from an EB-50A (s/n #46-006), it was to be used for heat transfer research. The X-1D was equipped with a new low-pressure fuel system and a slightly increased fuel capacity. There were also some minor changes of the avionics suite.

On 24 July 1951, with Bell test pilot Jean "Skip" Ziegler at the controls, the X-1D was launched over Rogers Dry Lake, on what was to become the only successful flight of its career. The unpowered glide was completed after a nine-minute descent, but upon landing, the nose landing gear failed and the aircraft slid ungracefully to a stop. Repairs took several weeks to complete and a second flight was scheduled for mid-August. On 22 August 1951, the X-1D was lost in a fuel explosion during preparations for the first powered flight. The aircraft was destroyed upon impact after it was jettisoned from its EB-50A mothership.

=== X-1E ===
(Bell Model 44)

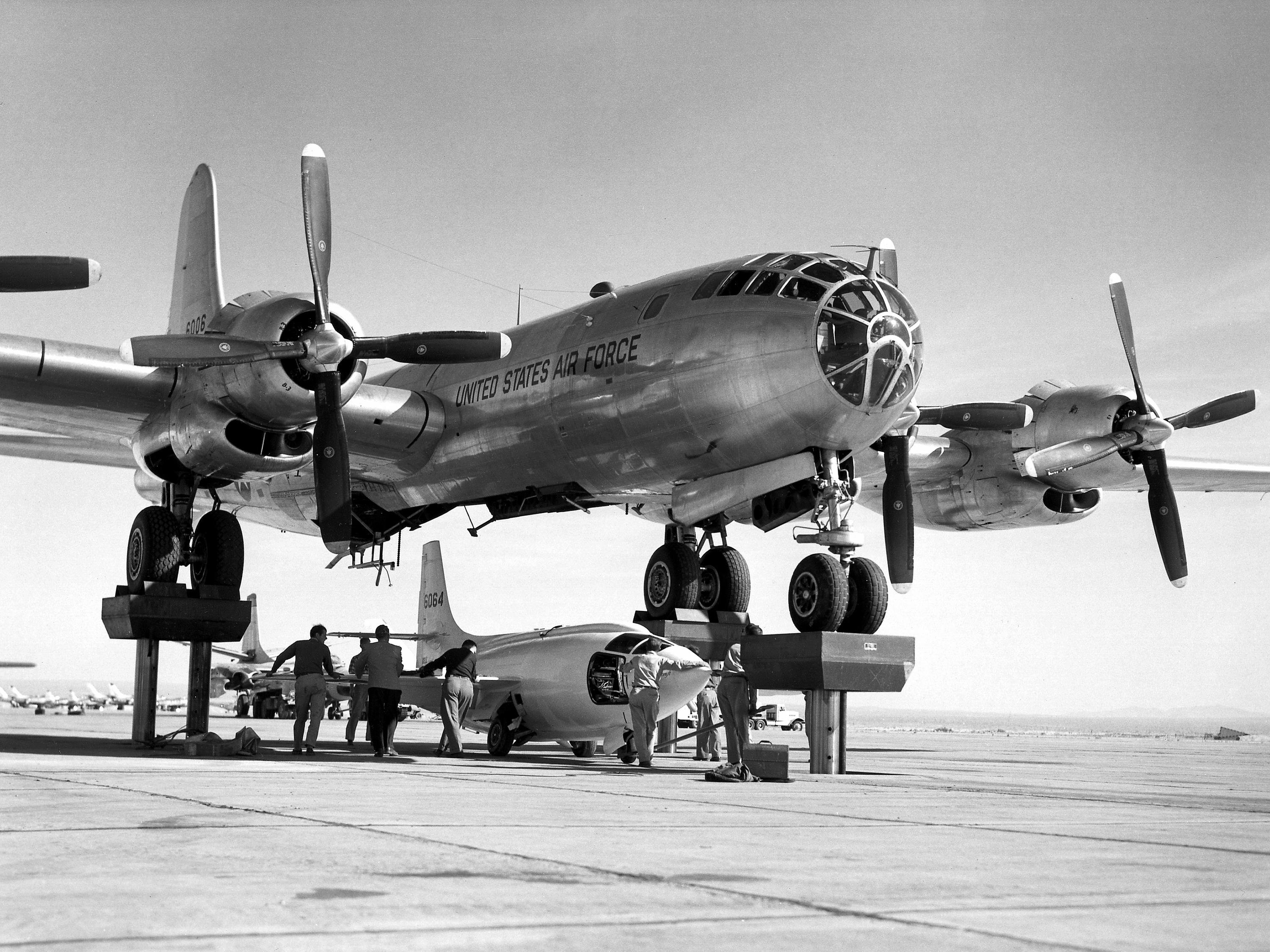
Bell X-1-3, aircraft #46-064, being mated to the B-50 mothership for a captive flight test on 9 November 1951. While being de-fueled after this flight it exploded, destroying itself and the B-50, and seriously burning Joe Cannon. X-1-3 had completed only a single glide-flight on 20 July.

The X-1E was the result of a reconstruction of the X-1-2 (serial 46-063), in order to pursue the goals originally set for the X-1D and X-1-3 (serial 46-064), both lost by explosions during 1951. The cause of the mysterious explosions was finally traced to the use of Ulmer leather gaskets impregnated with tricresyl phosphate (TCP), a leather treatment, which was used in the liquid oxygen plumbing. TCP becomes unstable and explosive in the presence of pure oxygen and mechanical shock. This mistake cost two lives, caused injuries and lost several aircraft.

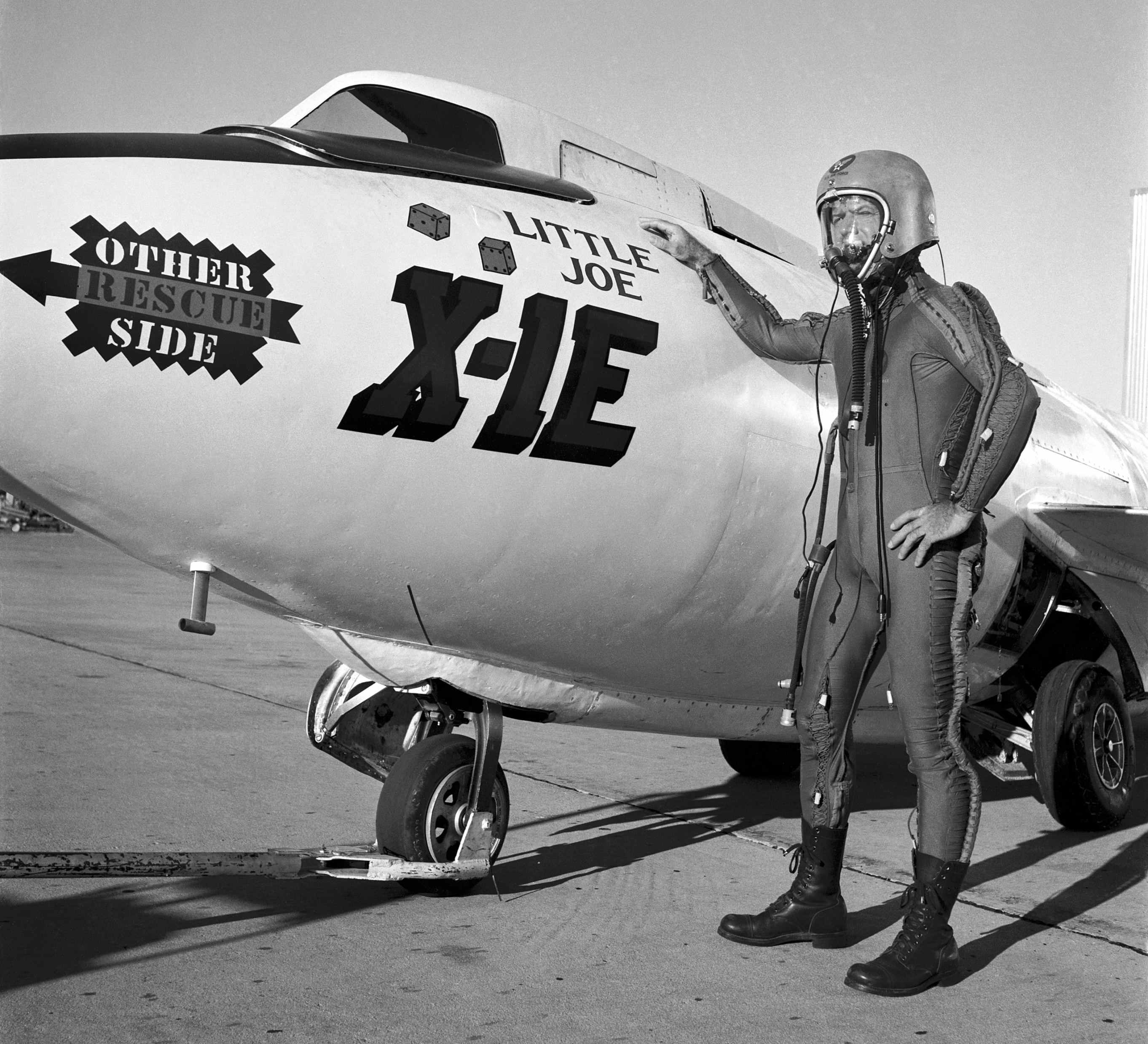
The X-1E, christened Little Joe, with pilot Joe Walker

The changes included:

- A turbopump fuel feed system, which eliminated the high-pressure nitrogen fuel system used in '062 and '063. Concerns about metal fatigue in the nitrogen fuel system resulted in the grounding of the X-1-2 after its 54th flight in its original configuration.
- A re-profiled super-thin wing (3 3/8 inches or 86 mm at the root), based on the X-3 Stiletto wing profile, enabling the X-1E to exceed Mach 2.
- A 'knife-edge' windscreen replaced the original greenhouse glazing, an upward-opening canopy replaced the fuselage side hatch and allowed the inclusion of an ejection seat.
- The addition of 200 pressure ports for aerodynamic data, and 343 strain gauges to measure structural loads and aerodynamic heating along the wing and fuselage.

The X-1E first flew on 15 December 1955, a glide-flight controlled by USAF test pilot Joe Walker. Walker left the X-1E program during 1958, after 21 flights, attaining a maximum speed of Mach 2.21 (2,410 km/h; 1,500 mph). NACA research pilot John B. McKay took his place during September 1958, completing five flights in pursuit of Mach 3 (3,300 km/h; 2,000 mph) before the X-1E was permanently grounded after its 26th flight, during November 1958, due to the discovery of structural cracks in the fuel tank wall.

== Aircraft on display ==
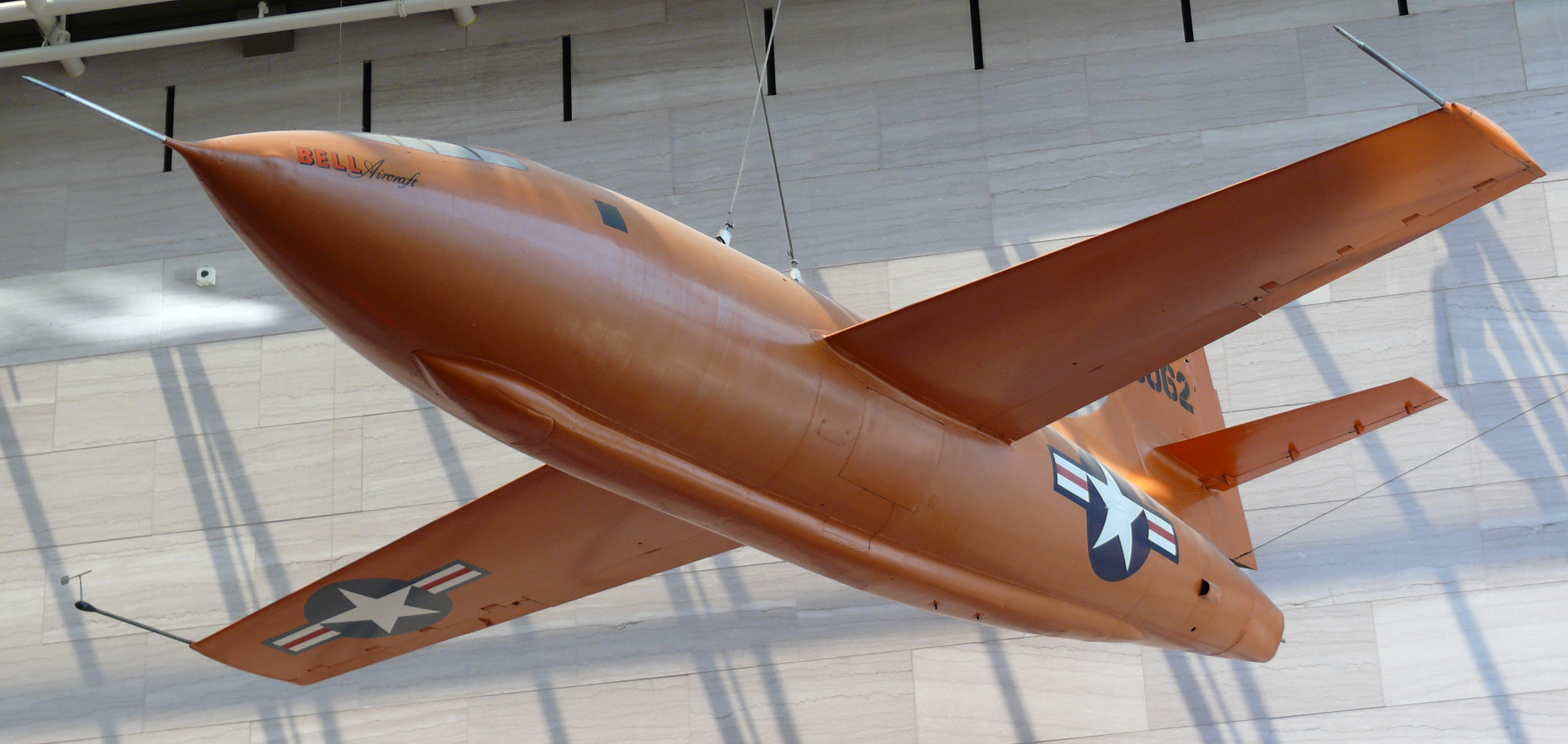
X-1-1 #46-062 Glamorous Glennis at the National Air and Space Museum. Its color is international orange.

- X-1-1, Air Force Serial Number 46-062 Glamorous Glennis, is currently displayed in the Boeing Milestones of Flight Hall of the National Air and Space Museum in Washington, D.C.. The aircraft was flown to Washington, D.C., beneath a B-29 and presented to what was then the American National Air Museum in 1950.
- X-1B, AF Ser. No. 48-1385, is on display in the Research & Development Hangar at the National Museum of the United States Air Force, Wright-Patterson Air Force Base, Ohio.
- X-1E, AF Ser. No. 46-063, is on display in front of the NASA Armstrong Flight Research Center headquarters building at Edwards Air Force Base, California. It is usually seen in episodes of the TV series I Dream of Jeannie, which was set at Cape Kennedy, Florida.

== Specifications (Bell X-1 #1 and #2) ==
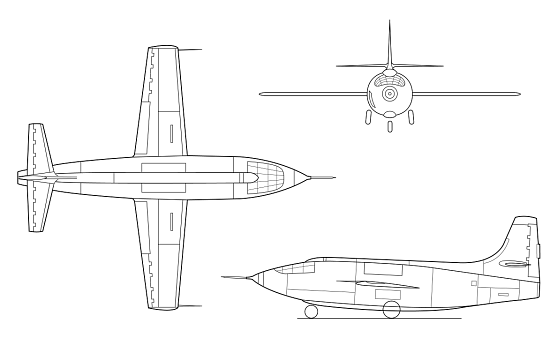
Bell X-1 orthographic diagram

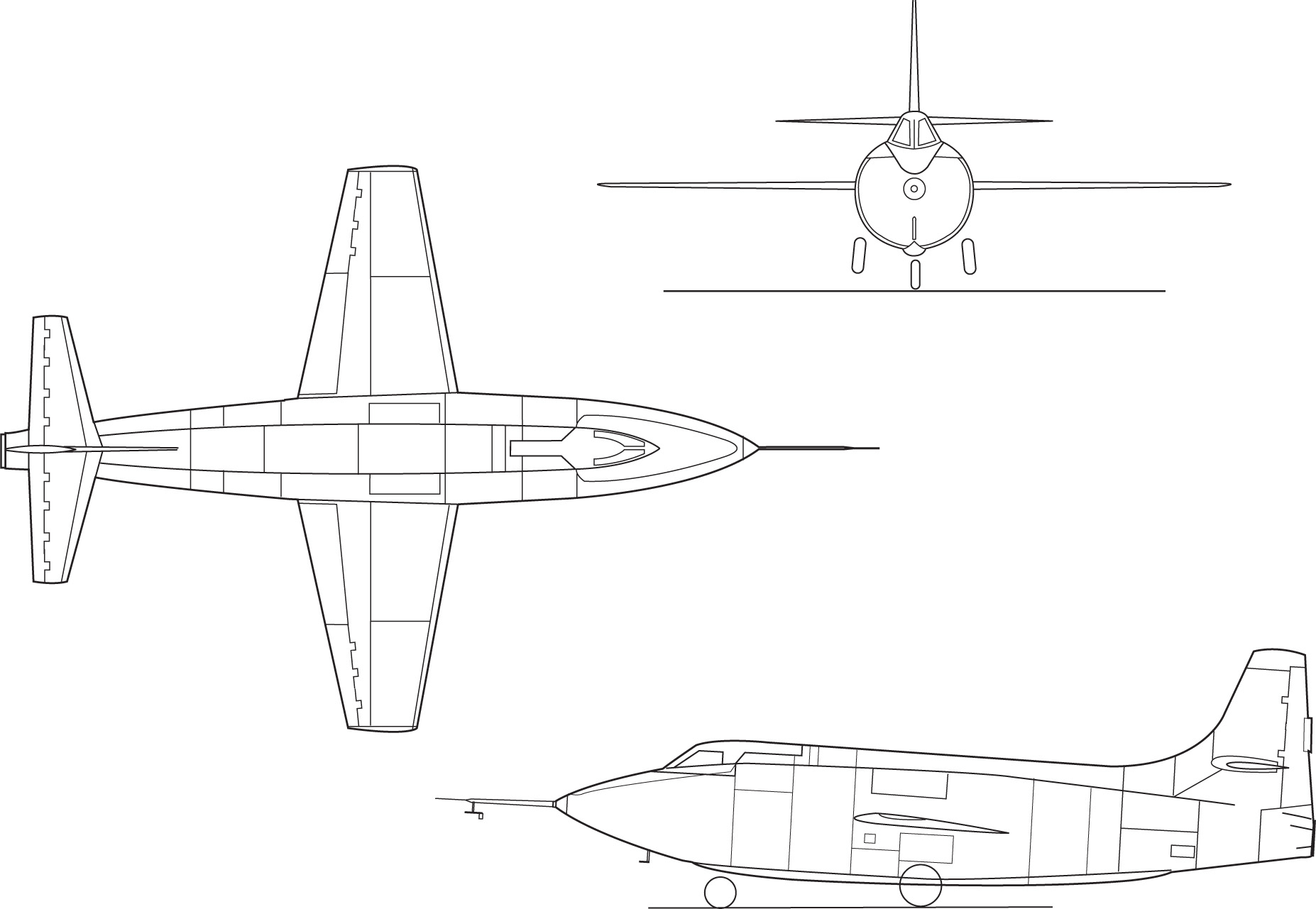
X-1E orthographic diagram

Data from Bell Aircraft since 1935, The X-Planes: X-1 to X-45

General characteristics

- Crew: 1
- Length: 30 ft 11 in (9.42 m)

X-1A, X-1B, X-1D: 35 ft 8 in (10.87 m)
X-1C: 35.0 ft (10.67 m)

- Wingspan: 28 ft 0 in (8.53 m)

X-1E: 22 ft 10 in (6.96 m)

- Height: 10 ft 10 in (3.30 m)
- Wing area: 130 sq ft (12 m^{2}) ⠀

X-1E 115 sq ft (10.7 m^{2})

- Airfoil:

#1 initially NACA 65-110 (10% thickness), replaced with NACA 65-108 (8% thickness) for powered flight tests
#2 NACA 65-110 (10% thickness),
X-1A, X-1B, X-1D NACA 65-108 (8% thickness),
X-1E NACA 64A004

- Empty weight: 7,000 lb (3,175 kg)

X-1A, X-1B, X-1C, X-1D: 6,880 lb (3,120 kg)
X-1E: 6,850 lb (3,110 kg)

- Gross weight: 12,250 lb (5,557 kg)

X-1A, X-1B, X-1C, X-1D: 16,487 lb (7,478 kg)
X-1E: 14,750 lb (6,690 kg)

- Powerplant: 1 × Reaction Motors XLR11-RM-3 4-chamber liquid-fuelled rocket engine, 6,000 lbf (27 kN) thrust

X-1E: Reaction Motors RMI LR-8-RM-5 6,000 lbf (27 kN)

Performance

- Maximum speed: 1,612 mph (2,594 km/h, 1,401 kn)

X-1E: 1,450 mph (1,260 kn; 2,330 km/h)

- Maximum speed: Mach 2.44

X-1E: M2.24

- Endurance: 5 minutes powered flight

X-1A, X-1B, X-1C, X-1D: 4 minutes 40 seconds powered flight
X-1E: 4 minutes 45 seconds powered flight

- Service ceiling: 70,000 ft (21,000 m)

X-1A, X-1B, X-1C, X-1D: 90,000 ft (27,000 m)
X-1E: 75,000 ft (23,000 m)

== See also ==
- Air Force Test Center
- Mach number
- North American X-15
- XS-1 (spacecraft)

Aircraft of comparable role, configuration, and era

- Miles M.52

Related lists

- List of experimental aircraft
- List of rocket aircraft
- List of X-1 flights
- List of X-1A flights
- List of X-1B flights
- List of X-1D flights
- List of X-1E flights
- List of X-planes
