= John B. McKay =

American naval officer, pilot, engineer and astronaut (1922–1975)

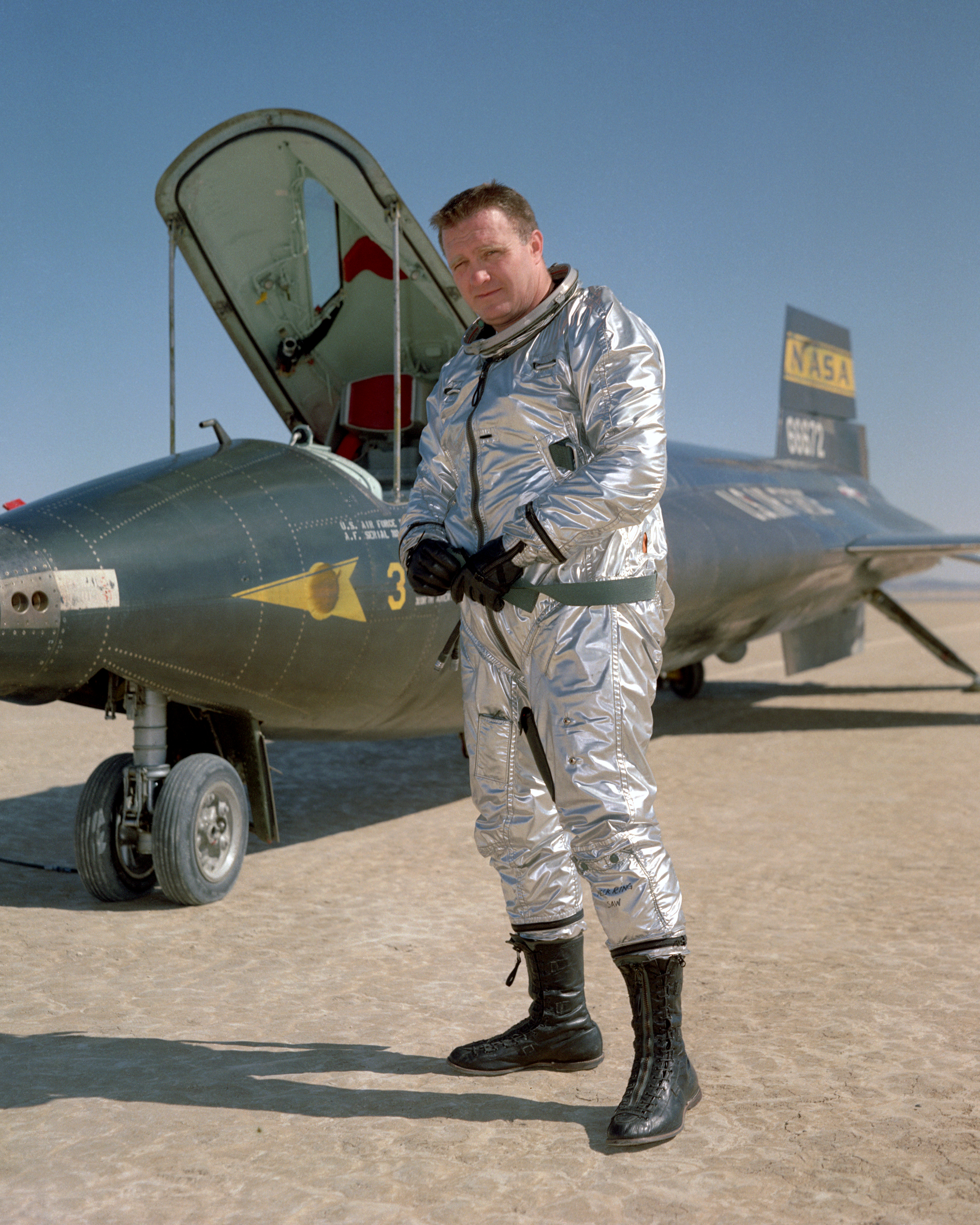
- McKay in 1964
- Born: December 8, 1922; Portsmouth, Virginia, U.S.
- Died: April 27, 1975 (aged 52); Lancaster, California, U.S.
- Other name: John Barron McKay
- Education: Virginia Tech, B.S. 1950
- Occupations: Naval aviator, test pilot
- Space career

USAF / NASA astronaut
- Selection: 1957 MISS Group
- Missions: X-15 Flight 150

John Barron McKay (December 8, 1922 – April 27, 1975) was an American naval officer, World War II pilot, aeronautical engineer, test pilot, and astronaut. He was one of twelve pilots who flew the North American X-15, an experimental spaceplane jointly operated by the United States Air Force and NASA. On September 28, 1965, he flew the X-15 to an altitude of 295,600 feet (90,100 m), thereby qualifying as an astronaut according to the United States definition of the boundary of space. However, this altitude did not surpass the Kármán line as defined by the FAI, the FAI-accepted boundary of 100 kilometres (62.1 mi).

On November 9, 1962, McKay was injured when forced to make an emergency landing in the X-15-2, the second of three planes in the X-15 fleet. The craft rolled over, and McKay suffered crushed vertebrae. Although McKay returned to flight as an X-15 pilot, his injuries contributed to an early death. He died on April 27, 1975, aged 52.

== Early life and education ==
Born on December 8, 1922, in Portsmouth, Virginia, to parents Milton Barron McKay (1895–1974) and Wilhelmina Emaline McKay (née Dearing; 1885–1970). During World War II he served as a Naval Aviator in the Pacific Theater, earning the Air Medal with two clusters, and a Presidential Unit Citation. He graduated from Virginia Polytechnic Institute in 1950 with a Bachelor of Science degree in Aeronautical Engineering. He was married and had eight children.

== Test pilot ==
McKay worked for the National Advisory Committee for Aeronautics (NACA) and its successor, NASA, from February 8, 1951, until October 5, 1971, and specialized in high-speed flight research programs. He began as an NACA intern, but assumed pilot status on July 11, 1952. In addition to the X-15, he flew such experimental aircraft as the D-558-1, D-558-2, X-lB, and the X-lE. He has also served as a research pilot on flight programs involving the F-100, F-102, F-104 and the F-107. In 1958, McKay was selected for and would have participated in the U.S. Air Force's Man In Space Soonest program, had it come to fruition.

McKay wrote several technical papers, and was a member of the American Institute of Aeronautics and Astronautics, as well as the Society of Experimental Test Pilots.

== Accident ==
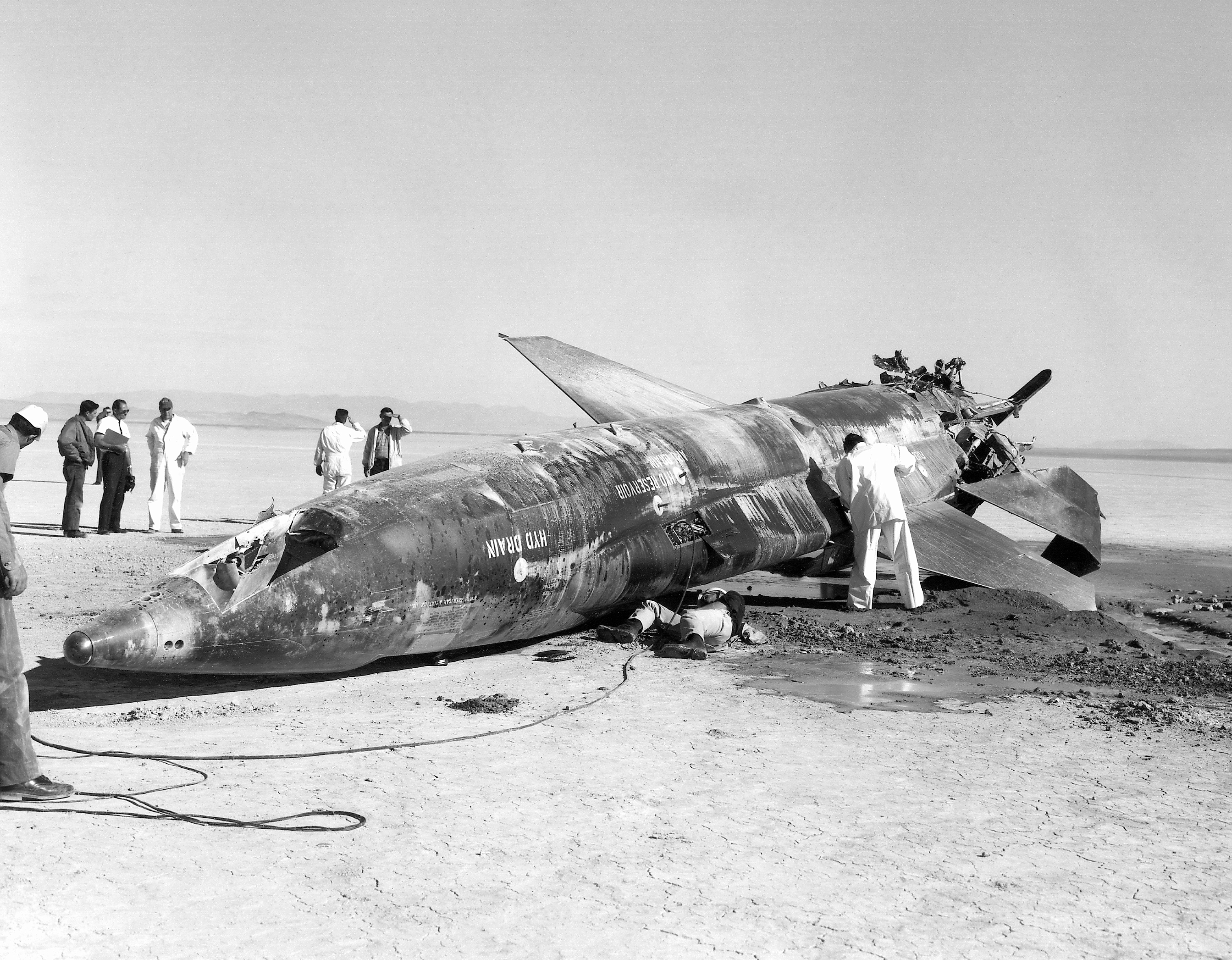
While McKay recovered from this mishap to fly again, the remainder of his life was plagued by injuries he had sustained and he died at age 52

On 9 November 1962, McKay undertook Flight 74 of the X-15 program on the X-15 56-6671 which was the Number-Two X-15 on its 31st flight. The X-15 was attached to its mothership the Boeing NB-52B Stratofortress 53-008, nicknamed Balls 8. McKay's mission was to reach an altitude of 125,000 feet (38,000 m) at Mach 5.5 and to fly the aircraft without the lower part of its ventral fin. Further, the mission was to determine the flight response and stability of the aircraft and the characteristics of its flight boundary layer.

The X-15 was released from the Stratofortress on schedule at 45,000 feet (14,000 m) over Mud Lake, Nevada at 10:23:07.0 local time with a launch speed of 450 knots. Upon release, McKay was unable to attain the full power of the rocket engine which became stuck at 30% power and unresponsive to throttle control. Due to the lack of throttle response it was decided to make a forced landing at Mud Lake instead of landing at Edwards Air Force Base due to concerns about the reliability of the engine. McKay was at an altitude of 53,950 feet (16,440 m) having attained a speed of Mach 1.49 when he started his descent for landing at Mud Lake. The motor was kept operating for 70.5 seconds to burn excess fuel and to reduce weight. The flaps failed to activate during landing and the aircraft speed at touchdown was higher than normal. Due to the excess speed and weight the aircraft experienced failures because of the increased dynamic loading which eventually led to its overturning.

The X-15 airframe rolled and struck the lakebed while inverted. While McKay appeared to suffer no permanent disabilities as a result of the crash, evidence was later found that he had sustained brain damage. Also, while he returned to piloting duties with NASA, recurring severe pain caused by the crash forced his early retirement.

== Death ==
McKay died on April 27, 1975, in Lancaster, California, at the age of 52.

Injuries suffered by McKay in the X-15 crash and subsequent permanent pain were a major factor in his premature death. He also suffered from diabetes and turned to alcohol to numb the pain of his accident injuries. Liver disease was a contributing factor to his death. In 1996, he was inducted into the Aerospace Walk of Honor, and in 2005 he was posthumously awarded Astronaut Wings.

== Awards and honors ==
- Air Medal (two clusters)
- Presidential Unit Citation
- John J. Montgomery Award
- National Society of Aerospace Professionals
- Award for Achievement, National Aeronautics Association
- Virginia Polytechnic Institute's Hall of Fame
- Aerospace Walk of Honor (1996)

== Bibliography ==
- Thompson, Milton O. (1992). At the Edge of Space: The X-15 Flight Program. Washington, D.C.: Smithsonian Institution Press. ISBN 1-56098-107-5. OCLC 24010699.
