= Timeline of first Earth observation satellites =

The timeline of first Earth observation satellites shows, in chronological order, those successful Earth observation satellites, that is, Earth satellites with a program of Earth science. Sputnik 1, while the first satellite ever launched, did not conduct Earth science. Explorer 1 was the first satellite to make an Earth science discovery when it found the Van Allen belts.

== 1950s ==
Satellite	Country	Date	Organization	Notes
Sputnik 2	Soviet Union	3 November 1957	Korolev Design Bureau	Researched charged particles near Earth
Explorer 1	United States	1 February 1958	U.S. Army Ballistic Missile Agency	Decayed 31 May 1970. Discovered Van Allen belts.
Explorer 2	United States	5 March 1958	U.S. Army Ballistic Missile Agency	Failed to orbit.
Vanguard 1	United States	17 March 1958	U.S. Naval Research Laboratory	Oldest artificial satellite in orbit, along with its upper stage.
Explorer 3	United States	26 March 1958	U.S. Army Ballistic Missile Agency	Decayed 28 June 1958.
Vanguard TV-5	United States	29 April 1958	U.S. Naval Research Laboratory	Failed to orbit.
Sputnik 3	Soviet Union	15 May 1958	Korolev Design Bureau	Decayed 6 April 1960.
Vanguard SLV-1	United States	28 May 1958	U.S. Naval Research Laboratory	Failed to orbit.
Vanguard SLV-2	United States	26 June 1958	U.S. Naval Research Laboratory	Failed to orbit.
Explorer 4	United States	26 July 1958	U.S. DARPA	Measured electrons & protons in radiation belts. Also measured data on Operation Argus nuclear explosions.
Explorer 5	United States	24 August 1958	U.S. DARPA	Failed to orbit.
Vanguard SLV-3	United States	26 September 1958	U.S. Naval Research Laboratory	Failed to orbit.
Beacon 1	United States	23 October 1958	NASA/U.S. Army	Failed to orbit.
Vanguard II	United States	17 February 1959	NASA/U.S. Naval Research Laboratory	Still in orbit.
Vanguard SLV-5	United States	14 April 1959	NASA	Failed to orbit.
Vanguard SLV-6	United States	22 June 1959	NASA	Failed to orbit.
Explorer S-1	United States	16 July 1959	NASA	Failed to orbit.
Explorer 6	United States	7 August 1959	Jet Propulsion Laboratory	Decayed 1 July 1961.
Beacon 2	United States	15 August 1959	NASA/U.S. Navy	Failed to orbit.
Vanguard III	United States	18 September 1959	U.S. Naval Research Laboratory	Still in orbit.
Explorer 7	United States	13 October 1959	NASA	Mapped the Earth's heat budget.

== 1960s ==
Satellite	Country	Date	Organization	Notes
Explorer 8	United States	3 November 1960	Jet Propulsion Laboratory	Ionospheric studies; decayed from orbit on 28 March 2012.
Explorer 9	United States	16 February 1961	Langley Research Center (NASA)	Thermosphere and exosphere studies; decayed from orbit on 9 April 1964.
Explorer S-56a	United States	25 February 1961		
Explorer 10	United States	25 March 1961	NASA	Magnetic field and plasma studies; decayed from orbit on June 1, 1968.
Explorer 11	United States	27 April 1961	NASA	Gamma ray detection
Explorer 12	United States	16 August 1961	NASA	Solar wind, cosmic ray and magnetic field studies
Explorer 13	United States	25 August 1961		
Kosmos 3	Soviet Union	24 April 1962		Decayed from orbit on 17 October 1962.
Ariel 1	United Kingdom	26 April 1962	NASA-SERC	Ionospheric studies; decayed from orbit on 24 May 1976.
Kosmos 5	Soviet Union	28 May 1962		
Kosmos 8	Soviet Union	18 August 1968		Micrometeoroid detection; discovered meteoroid flux
Alouette 1	Canada	29 September 1962	DRDC	Ionospheric studies
TAVE	United States	29 September 1962		
Explorer 14	United States	2 October 1962	NASA	Particle and field detection
Explorer 15	United States	27 October 1962	NASA	
Explorer 900	United States	16 December 1962		

== See also ==
- List of Earth observation satellites
