= Vanguard TV-5 =

Failed rocket launch

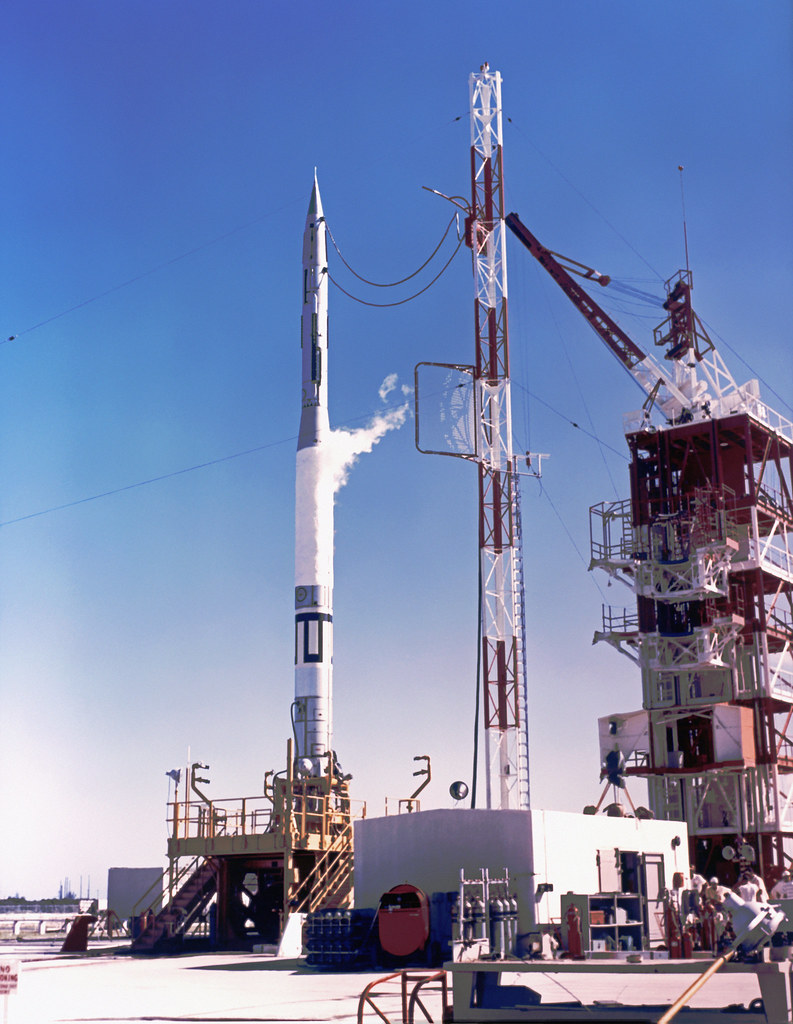
- Vanguard rocket on LC-18A prior to its launch
- Names: Vanguard Test Vehicle-Five
- Mission type: Earth science
- Operator: U.S. Navy
- Mission duration: Failed to orbit

Spacecraft properties
- Spacecraft: Vanguard TV-5
- Spacecraft type: Vanguard
- Manufacturer: Naval Research Laboratory
- Launch mass: 9.75 kg (21.5 lb)
- Dimensions: 50.8 cm (20.0 in) of diameter

Start of mission
- Launch date: 29 April 1958, 02:53:00 GMT
- Rocket: Vanguard TV-5
- Launch site: Cape Canaveral, LC-18A
- Contractor: Glenn L. Martin Company

End of mission
- Decay date: Failed to orbit

Orbital parameters
- Reference system: Geocentric orbit (planned)
- Regime: Medium Earth orbit
- Perigee altitude: 655 km
- Apogee altitude: 3970 km
- Inclination: 34.20°
- Period: 134.0 minutes

Vanguard TV-5, also called Vanguard Test Vehicle-Five, was a failed flight of the American Vanguard rocket following the successful launch of Vanguard 1 on Vanguard TV-4. Vanguard TV-5 launched on 29 April 1958 at 02:53:00 GMT, from Launch Complex 18A at the Cape Canaveral Air Force Station. The rocket was unsuccessful in its attempt to place an unnamed satellite into orbit.

== Background ==
Project Vanguard (1955-1959) was America's first satellite program, initiated to represent the United States in the International Geophysical Year (IGY), an international effort to study the Earth's physical properties. The U.S. Navy's Naval Research Laboratory (NRL) was chosen to direct the satellite project in part due to their success with the Viking sounding rocket program. NRL was tasked with not only designing and building the satellite, also the booster that would carry it into orbit, as well as the first world-wide satellite tracking network (Minitrack).

After three successful flight tests, which proved the Vanguard rocket's first stage and internal telemetry systems (TV-0 on 8 December 1956; TV-1 on 1 May 1957; TV-2 on 23 October 1957), Project Vanguard suffered two setbacks. On 6 December 1957, the first complete Vanguard rocket (TV-3), with three live stages and carrying a minimal satellite with no scientific experiments, blew up two seconds after liftoff. Two months later, on 5 February 1958, the identically configured TV-3BU broke up when a control system malfunction, after 57 seconds of normal flight, caused the Vanguard rocket to exceed a 45° angle of attack.

On 17 March 1958, however, Vanguard 1 was successfully launched into orbit, marking the first full triumph for the project. The next step would be to launch a full-sized, instrumented Vanguard. For that purpose, TV-4BU, a back-up rocket identical to the TV-4 that had launched Vanguard 1, was converted to carry the larger satellite.

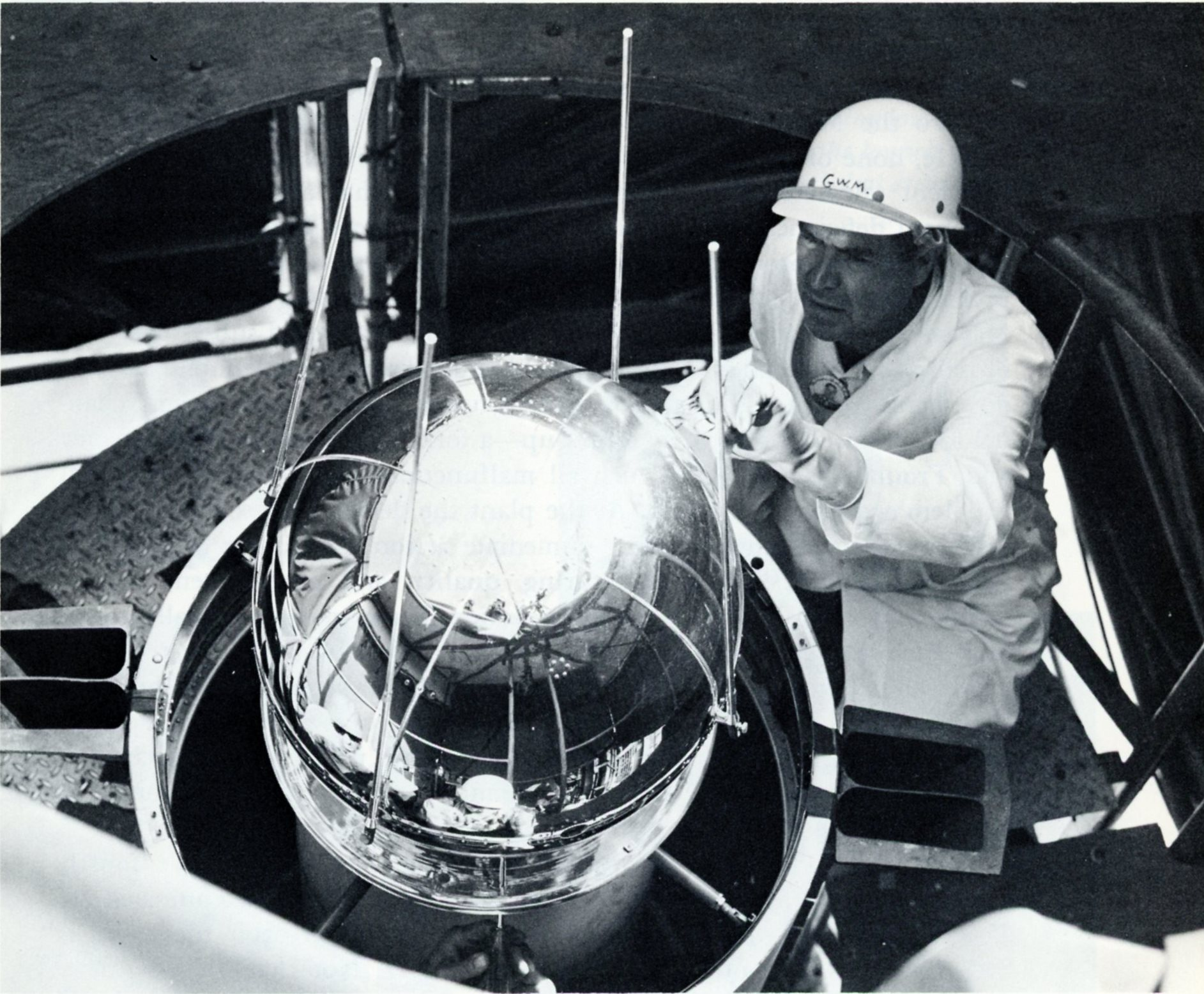
A Glenn L. Martin Company technician installs the Vanguard TV-5 satellite onto its booster.

== Spacecraft ==
Vanguard TV5's satellite was a 9.75 kg (21.5 lb), 50.8 cm (20 inches) diameter sphere whose shell was composed of magnesium coated with highly polished silicon monoxide. A 108.00 MHz transmitter at 80 milliwatts was designed to provide tracking and telemetry, transmitting and receiving using four protruding metal rod antennas. Power was supplied by mercury batteries. The payload included ionization chambers sensitive to X-ray wavelengths produced in solar flares (1 to 8 Å, or 100 to 800 pm).

== Mission ==
TV-5's first stage was erected on the firing stand at Launch Complex 18A by the first week of April. However, by then, the pad managers had viewed the flight film from TV-4 and determined that the hydraulic disconnects had not separated smoothly from the rocket at liftoff. A new, pull-away firing structure was under construction, but it would not be completed for some time. As a result, modifications were made to the existing, static stand.

Vanguard TV-5 was launched on 29 April 1958 at 02:53:00 GMT (28 April 1958, 21:53:00 ET), from Cape Canaveral, Florida. The launch proceeded nominally through the second stage burnout 262 seconds after launch. Following this, however, two electric relays malfunctioned and failed to transmit the signal to arm the coasting flight control system, preventing the third stage from separating and firing. The second and third stages reached an altitude of 576 km (358 miles) and crashed about 2600 km (1600 miles) downrange from the launch site. This concluded the Vanguard Test Vehicle series, the Vanguard missions following this were designated Vanguard Satellite Launch Vehicle (SLV) followed by a sequential number.

The program achieved success in the following year with the launch of Vanguard 2 on 17 February 1959. TV-5's X-ray experiment package was successfully put into orbit on Vanguard 3, flown on Vanguard rocket SLV-7 on 18 September 1959. However, the ionization chambers were completely saturated by the Van Allen Belts and returned no useful data. It was not until the instruments were orbited on SOLRAD 1 on 22 June 1960, a combination surveillance/science satellite designed on the Vanguard frame, that meaningful results were obtained.

== See also ==
- Vanguard rocket
- Project Vanguard
- Comparison of orbital launch systems
- Comparison of orbital rocket engines
- Rocket
- Spacecraft propulsion
