= Vanguard SLV-5 =

Failed rocket launch

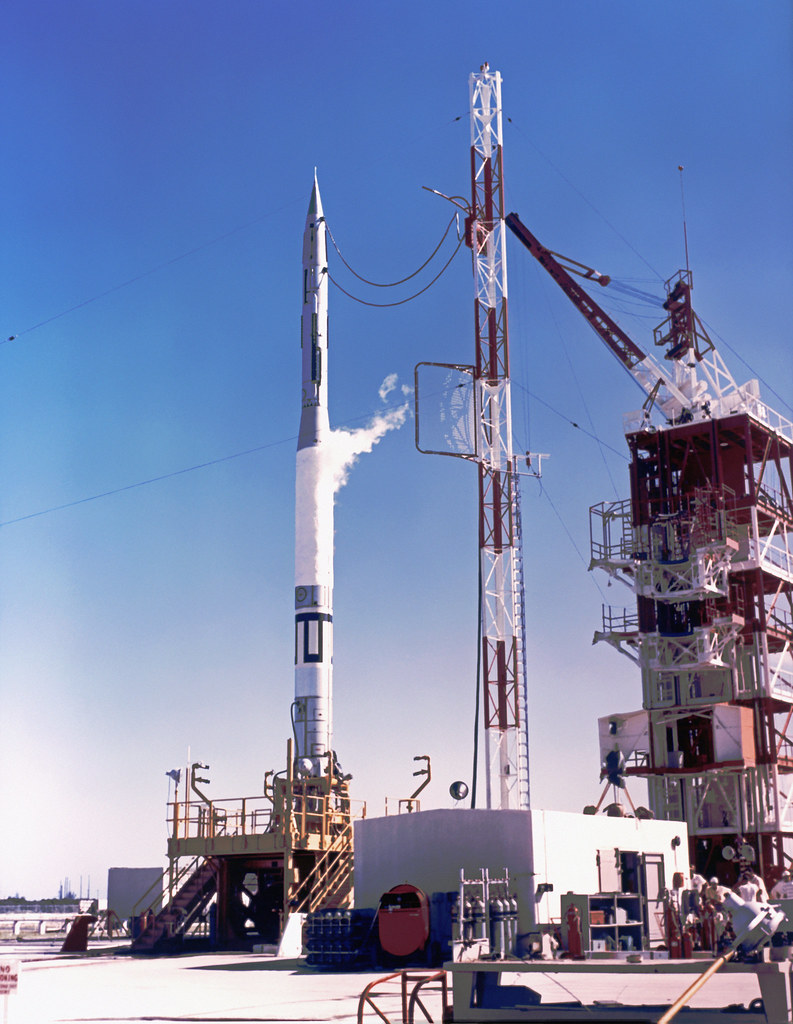
- Vanguard rocket on LC-18A prior to its launch
- Names: Vanguard Space Launch Vehicle-Five
- Mission type: Magnetic Field Experiment; Air Density Experiment
- Operator: Naval Research Laboratory
- Mission duration: Failed to orbit (500 seconds)

Spacecraft properties
- Spacecraft: Vanguard 3A
- Spacecraft type: Vanguard
- Manufacturer: Naval Research Laboratory
- Launch mass: 10.3 kg (23 lb)

Start of mission
- Launch date: 14 April 1959, 02:49:46 GMT
- Rocket: Vanguard SLV-5
- Launch site: Cape Canaveral, LC-18A
- Contractor: Glenn L. Martin Company

End of mission
- Decay date: Failed to orbit

Orbital parameters
- Reference system: Geocentric orbit (planned)
- Regime: Medium Earth orbit
- Perigee altitude: 655 km
- Apogee altitude: 3840 km
- Inclination: 34.20°
- Period: 134.0 minutes

Instruments
- Magnetometer

Vanguard SLV-5 (also called Vanguard Satellite Launch Vehicle-Five), launched on 14 April 1959, was an unsuccessful launch of a Project Vanguard satellite. It was to have been the third successful flight of the American Vanguard rocket following the successful Vanguard 2 satellite on rocket Vanguard SLV-4; however, a second-stage booster failure caused the rocket and payload to instead crash into the Atlantic Ocean.

== Background ==
Vanguard Satellite Launch Vehicle-5 (SLV-5) was designed to place two satellites in orbit, Vanguard 3A, a 33 cm (13 in) of diameter sphere (Sphere A) equipped with a magnetometer, and a 76.2 cm (30.0 in) of diameter aluminum-coated round inflatable sphere (Sphere B), containing no instrumentation, but an air density measurement device, for optical tracking. Launched in April 1959, the mission failed when the second stage failed to operate following first-stage separation. The satellites and third stage tumbled into the Atlantic Ocean several hundred kilometers off the coast after about 500 seconds of flight.

== Launch vehicle ==
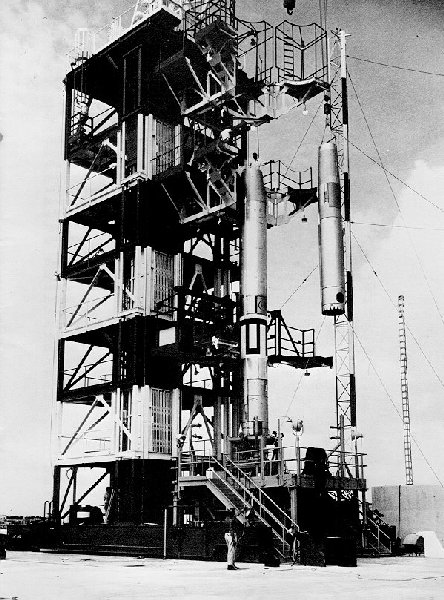
Second stage of Vanguard being hoisted into position

Vanguard was the designation used for both the launch vehicle and the satellite. The first stage of the three-stage Vanguard Test Vehicle was powered by a General Electric X-405 125,000 N (28,000 lb_{f}) thrust liquid rocket engine, propelled by 7,200 kg (15,900 lb) of kerosene (RP-1) and liquid oxygen, with helium pressurant. It also held 152 kg (335 lb) of hydrogen peroxide. It was finless, 13.4 m (44 ft) tall, 1.14 m (3 ft 9 in) in diameter, and had a launch mass of approximately 8,090 kg (17,840 lb).

The second stage was a 5.8 m (19 ft) high, 0.8 m (2 ft 7 in) of diameter Aerojet General AJ-10 liquid engine burning 1,520 kg (3,350 lb) Unsymmetrical dimethylhydrazine (UDMH) and White Inhibited Fuming Nitric Acid (WIFNA) with a helium pressurant tank. It produced a thrust of 32,600 N (7,300 lb_{f}) and had a launch mass of approximately 1,990 kg (4,390 lb). This stage contained the complete guidance and control system.

A solid-propellant rocket with 10,400 N (2,300 lb_{f}) of thrust (for 30 seconds burn time) was developed by the Grand Central Rocket Company to satisfy third-stage requirements. The stage was 1.5 m (4 ft 11 in) high, 0.8 m (2 ft 7 in) in diameter, and had a launch mass of 194 kg (428 lb). The thin 0.076 cm (0.030 in) steel casing for the third stage had a hemispherical forward dome with a shaft at the center to support the satellite and an aft dome fairing into a steel exit nozzle.

The total height of the vehicle with the satellite fairing was about 21.9 m (72 ft). The payload capacity was 11.3 kg (25 lb) to a 555 km (345 mi) Earth orbit. A nominal launch would have the first stage firing for 144 seconds, bringing the rocket to an altitude of 58 km (36 mi), followed by the second stage burn of 120 seconds to 480 km (300 mi), whereupon the third stage would bring the satellite to orbit. This was the same launch vehicle configuration, with minor modifications, as used for Vanguard TV-3 and all succeeding Vanguard flights up to and including Vanguard SLV-6.

== Spacecraft ==
=== Magnetic Field Satellite ===
The primary objective of the Magnetic Field Satellite (Sphere A) was to determine the source of magnetic storms - to determine if they occur due to electric currents in the ionosphere or from currents at much greater distances. A secondary objective was to obtain data on the daily cycle of magnetic field variations, thus providing a highly accurate map of the Earth's main magnetic field in certain regions of space.

The Magnetic Field Satellite was a 33 cm (13 in) of diameter fiberglass sphere with a 6.2 cm (2.44 inch) of diameter fiberglass cylindrical boom protruding 43.8 cm (17.2 in) from the top, and a 7.0 cm (2.8 in) diameter magnesium cylinder protruding 4.1 cm (1.6 in) from the base. Four 59.7 cm (23.5 in) spring-actuated antennas were mounted to the satellites equator, equally spaced. Each antennas was 0.95 cm (0.37 in) in diameter at the base and 0.64 cm (0.25 in) at the tip. The interior of the satellite held a cylindrical magnesium container with two pressure-tight compartments. The lower compartment held the batteries, and the upper compartment held the magnetometer electronics, an 80 milliwatt telemetry transmitter operating at 108.3 MHz, a 10 milliwatt Minitrack beacon transmitter at 108.00 MHz, and a command receiver. The magnetometer was a proton precessional magnetometer. The magnetometer sensing unit was mounted in the outer end of the fiberglass boom. The design of the satellite required non-magnetic materials, including special batteries.

=== Sub-Satellite ===
The Sub-Satellite (Sphere B) objective was to provide data on air density in the outer limits of the atmosphere of Earth. A later version of the Magnetic Field Satellite was successfully launched as Vanguard 3 (1959 Eta 1).

The Sub-Satellite was stored, uninflated, in a fiberglass container beneath the Magnetic Field Satellite, along with a small tank containing nitrogen at a pressure of 9,700 kPa (1,410 psi). On separation of the Magnetic Field Satellite, a preset latch would release the gas into the Sub-Satellite, inflating it and pushing it free of the spent third stage. Upon inflation, the Sub-Satellite would be a 76.2 cm (30 inch) diameter aluminum-coated mylar balloon. It contained no instrumentation and was designed to be optically tracked from Earth to provide data on the density of the upper atmosphere by measuring its effect on the satellite orbit.

== Launch ==
Vanguard SLV-5 launched on 14 April 1959 at 02:49:46 GMT (09:49:46 p.m. EST, 13 April 1959), from Launch Complex 18A (LC-18A) at the Cape Canaveral Air Force Station (CCAFS). At separation of the first stage 142.0 seconds after launch, caused the second stage engine to ignite while still attached to the first stage. Pressure from the engine exhaust pushed the thrust chamber to the limit of the gimbal stops, breaking them and causing loss of attitude control in flight. The pitch-attitude control of the second stage was lost due to large side forces acting on the second stage exhaust nozzle caused by back pressure built up in the interstage compartment. The third stage and satellites were thrown from the tumbling second stage. The second stage tumbled and the resultant forces caused a premature separation of the third stage and payload. Data was received from them until impact into the Atlantic Ocean eight minutes after liftoff.

== See also ==
- Vanguard rocket
- Project Vanguard
- Comparison of orbital launch systems
- Comparison of orbital rocket engines
- Rocket
- Spacecraft propulsion
