= Vanguard TV-3BU =

Second flight of the American Vanguard rocket

- Vanguard rocket undergoing static test on launch pad
- Names: Vanguard Test Vehicle-Three Backup
- Mission type: International Geophysical Year
- Operator: Naval Research Laboratory
- COSPAR ID: VAGT3B
- Mission duration: 62 seconds (failed to orbit)

Spacecraft properties
- Spacecraft: Vanguard 1B
- Spacecraft type: Vanguard
- Manufacturer: Naval Research Laboratory
- Launch mass: 1.5 kg
- Dimensions: Sphere of 16.3 cm in diameter

Start of mission
- Launch date: 5 February 1958, 07:33 GMT
- Rocket: Vanguard
- Launch site: Cape Canaveral, LC-18A
- Contractor: Glenn L. Martin Company

End of mission
- Decay date: Failed to orbit

Orbital parameters
- Reference system: Geocentric orbit (planned)
- Regime: Low Earth orbit
- Perigee altitude: 655 km
- Apogee altitude: 3840 km
- Inclination: 34.2°
- Period: 132.0 minutes

Newsreel of the Vanguard TV-3BU launch

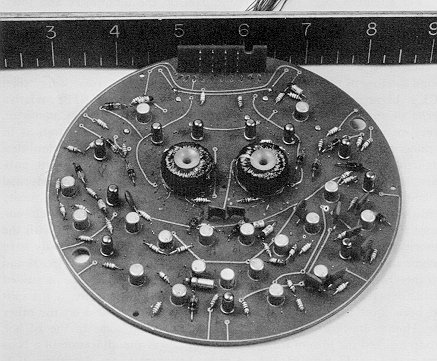
The Vanguard 1 satellite electronics card

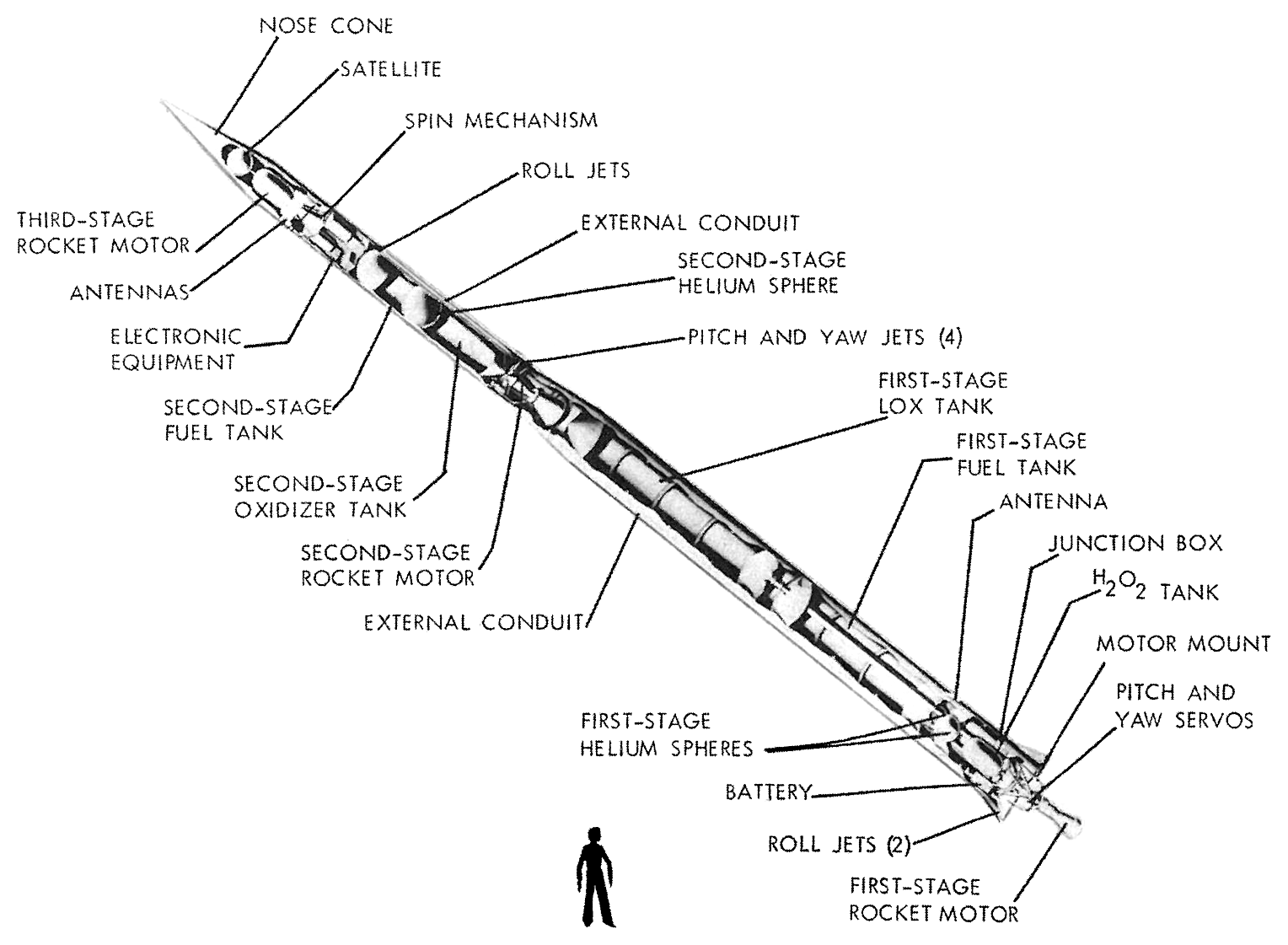
The Vanguard rocket cutaway view

Vanguard TV-3BU, also called Vanguard Test Vehicle-Three Backup, was the second flight of the American Vanguard rocket. An unsuccessful attempt to place an unnamed satellite, Vanguard 1B, into orbit, the rocket was launched on 5 February 1958. It was launched from LC-18A at the Cape Canaveral Air Force Station. Fifty-seven seconds after launch, control of the vehicle was lost, and it failed to achieve orbit. At 57 seconds, the booster suddenly pitched down. The skinny second stage broke in half from aerodynamic stress, causing the Vanguard to tumble end-over-end before a range safety officer sent the destruct command. The cause of the failure was attributed to a spurious guidance signal that caused the first stage to perform unintended pitch maneuvers. Vanguard TV-3BU only reached an altitude of 6.1 km (3.8 mi), the goal was 3,840 km (2,390 mi).

== History ==
Early Vanguard project tests had no failures. Vanguard TV-0, Vanguard Test Vehicle zero, was a successful one-stage test done on 8 December 1956. Vanguard TV-1 was a successful one-stage test done on 1 May 1957. Vanguard TV-2 was a successful stage one test on 23 October 1957. Vanguard TV-3BU failure followed Vanguard TV-3 failure, putting the project in chaos. But the next launch, Vanguard 1 on Vanguard TV-4 was successful and put into orbit the fourth artificial Earth orbital satellite and the first satellite to be solar-powered.

The first small-lift launch vehicle was the Sputnik rocket, an uncrewed orbital launch vehicle designed by Sergei Korolev in the Soviet Union, derived from the R-7 Semyorka Intercontinental ballistic missile (ICBM). On 4 October 1957, the Sputnik rocket was used to perform the world's first satellite launch, placing Sputnik 1 satellite into a low Earth orbit. The failure of TV-3BU was another setback for the United States in the early Space Race with the Soviets.

== Mission ==
The main purpose of the Vanguard Test Vehicle launchings was systems testing for the launch vehicle and satellite. The program objectives for the satellite were to conduct micrometeorite impact and geodetic measurements from Earth orbit. Engineering studies included the electron charge and temperature of the satellite. The IGY Vanguard satellite program was designed to launch one or more Earth-orbiting satellites during the International Geophysical Year (IGY), which ended on 31 December 1958.

== Launch ==
The launch took place on 5 February 1958 at 07:33 GMT from the Atlantic Missile Range, from LC-18A in Cape Canaveral Air Force Station, Florida. The initial launch was nominal, but at an altitude of 460 m (1,510 ft) a malfunction in a connection between control system units or in the first stage servo amplifier resulted in the loss of attitude control. Spurious electrical signals caused-motion of the first stage engine in the pitch plane. At an altitude of about 6.1 km (20,000 feet), 57 seconds into the flight, a violent pitch-down to 45° resulted in excessive structural and air loads on the launch vehicle, which broke up at the aft end of the second stage at 62 seconds, ending the mission.

== Spacecraft ==
Vanguard was the designation used for both the satellite and the launch vehicle. The satellite was identical to the Vanguard TV-3 satellite, an approximately 1.5 kg aluminum sphere of 16.3 cm in diameter, nearly identical to the later Vanguard 1. A cylinder lined with heat shields mounted inside the sphere held the instrument payload. It contained a set of mercury-batteries, a 10 mW, 108 MHz telemetry transmitter powered by the batteries, and a 5 mW, 108.03 MHz Minitrack beacon transmitter, which was powered by six square (roughly 5 cm on a side) solar cells, manufactured by Bell Laboratories, mounted on the body of the satellite. Six 30 cm long, 0.8 cm diameter spring-actuated aluminum alloy aerials protruded from the sphere. On actuation, the aerial axes were mutually perpendicular to lines that passed through the center of the sphere. The transmitters were primarily for engineering and tracking data, but were also to determine the total electron content between the spacecraft and ground stations. Vanguard also carried two thermistors which could measure the interior temperature to track the effectiveness of the thermal protection.

A cylindrical separation device was designed to keep the sphere attached to the third stage before deployment. At deployment, a strap holding the satellite in place would be released, and three leaf springs would separate the satellite from the cylinder and third stage at a relative velocity of about 0.3 m/s.

== Launch vehicle ==
The first stage of the three-stage Vanguard Test vehicle was powered by a General Electric GE X-405 liquid rocket engine, of 125,000 N (28,000 lb_{f}) of thrust, propelled by 7,200 kg (15,900 lb) of kerosene (RP-1) and LOX, with helium pressurant. It also held 152 kg (335 lb) of hydrogen peroxide. It was finless, 13.4 m (44 ft) tall, 1.14 m (3 ft 9 in) in diameter, and had a launch mass of approximately 8,090 kg (17,840 lb).

The second stage was a 5.8 m (19 ft) high, 0.8 m (2 ft 7 in) diameter Aerojet General AJ-10 liquid engine burning 1,520 kg (3,350 lb) Unsymmetrical Dimethylhydrazine (UDMH) and White Inhibited Fuming Nitric Acid (WIFNA) with a helium pressurant tank. It produced a thrust of 32,600 N (7,300 lb_{f}) and had a launch mass of approximately 1,990 kg (4,390 lb). This stage contained the complete guidance and control system.

A solid-propellant rocket with 10,400 N (2,300 lb_{f}) of thrust (for 30 seconds burn time) was developed by the Grand Central Rocket Company to satisfy third-stage requirements. The stage was 1.5 m (4 ft 11 in) high, 0.8 m (2 ft 7 in) in diameter and had a launch mass of 194 kg (428 lb). The thin 0.076 cm (0.030 in) steel casing for the third stage had a hemispherical forward dome with a shaft at the center to support the spacecraft and an aft dome fairing into a steel exit nozzle.

The total height of the vehicle with the satellite fairing was about 21.9 m (72 ft). The payload capacity was 11.3 kg (25 lb) to a 555 km (345 mi) Earth orbit. A nominal launch would have the first stage firing for 144 seconds, bringing the rocket to an altitude of 58 km (36 mi), followed by the second stage burn of 120 seconds to 480 km (300 mi), whereupon the third stage would bring the spacecraft to orbit. This was the same launch vehicle configuration, with minor modifications, as used for Vanguard TV-3 and all succeeding Vanguard flights up to and including Vanguard SLV-6.

== See also ==
- Vanguard rocket
- Project Vanguard
- Comparison of orbital launch systems
- Comparison of orbital rocket engines
- Rocket
- Spacecraft propulsion
