= Vanguard SLV-3 =

Failed rocket launch

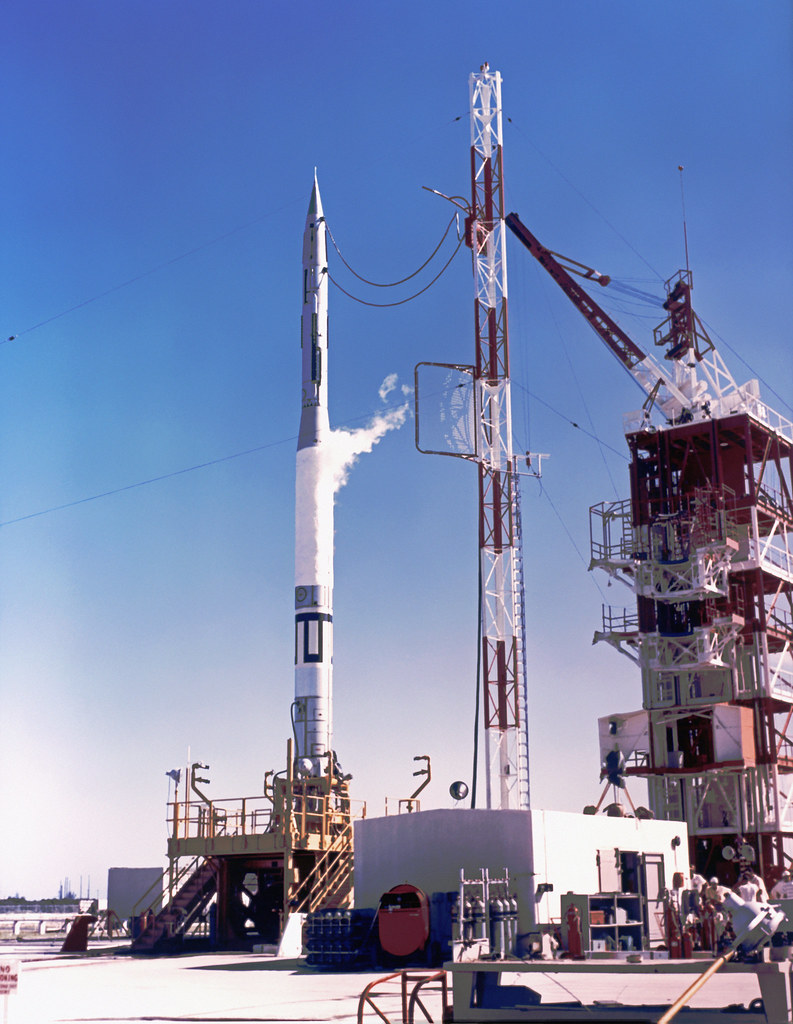
- Vanguard rocket on LC-18A prior to its launch
- Names: Vanguard Space Launch Vehicle-3
- Mission type: International Geophysical Year
- Operator: Naval Research Laboratory
- Mission duration: Failed to orbit

Spacecraft properties
- Spacecraft: Vanguard 2D
- Spacecraft type: Vanguard
- Manufacturer: Naval Research Laboratory
- Launch mass: 10.6 kg (23 lb)
- Dimensions: 50.8 cm (20.0 in) of diameter

Start of mission
- Launch date: 26 September 1958, 15:38 GMT
- Rocket: Vanguard SLV-3
- Launch site: Cape Canaveral, LC-18A
- Contractor: Glenn L. Martin Company

End of mission
- Decay date: Failed to orbit

Orbital parameters
- Reference system: Geocentric orbit (planned)
- Regime: Medium Earth orbit
- Perigee altitude: 655 km
- Apogee altitude: 3970 km
- Inclination: 34.20°
- Period: 134.0 minutes

Vanguard SLV-3, also called Vanguard Satellite Launch Vehicle-3 hoped to be the second successful flight of the American Vanguard rocket following successful Vanguard 1 satellite on rocket Vanguard TV-4.

== Background ==
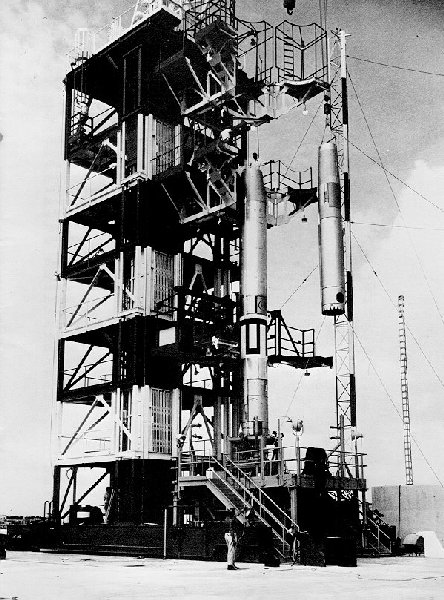
Second stage of Vanguard being hoisted into position

Vanguard Satellite Launch Vehicle-3 (SLV-3) was launched on 26 September 1958. The second stage failed to achieve the minimal performance necessary to maintain Earth orbit, and the spacecraft re-entered the atmosphere and burned up. The objective of the satellite was to scan Earth's cloud cover from orbit. The purpose of the IGY Vanguard satellite program, run by the U.S. Navy, was to launch one or more satellites into Earth orbit during the International Geophysical Year (IGY).

== Launch vehicle ==
Vanguard was the designation used for both the launch vehicle and the satellite. The first stage of the three-stage Vanguard Test vehicle was powered by a General Electric X-405 125,000 N (28,000 lb_{f}) thrust liquid rocket engine, propelled by 7200 kg of kerosene (RP-1) and liquid oxygen, with helium pressurant. It also held 152 kg of hydrogen peroxide. It was finless, 13.4 metres tall, 1.14 metres in diameter, and had a launch mass of approximately 8090 kg.

The second stage was a 5.8 metres high, 0.8 metres diameter Aerojet General AJ-10 liquid engine burning 1520 kg Unsymmetrical dimethylhydrazine (UDMH) and White Inhibited Fuming Nitric Acid (WIFNA) with a helium pressurant tank. It produced a thrust of 32,600 N (7,300 lb_{f}) and had a launch mass of approximately 1990 kg. This stage contained the complete guidance and control system.

A solid-propellant rocket with 10,400 N (2,300 lb_{f})) of thrust (for 30 seconds burn time) was developed by the Grand Central Rocket Company to satisfy third-stage requirements. The stage was 1.5 metres high, 0.8 metres in diameter, and had a launch mass of 194 kg. The thin (0.076 cm) steel casing for the third stage had a hemispherical forward dome with a shaft at the center to support the satellite and an aft dome fairing into a steel exit nozzle.

The total height of the vehicle with the satellite fairing was about 21.9 metres. The payload capacity was 11.3 kg to a 555 km Earth orbit. A nominal launch would have the first stage firing for 144 seconds, bringing the rocket to an altitude of 58 km, followed by the second stage burn of 120 seconds to 480 km, whereupon the third stage would bring the satellite to orbit. This was the same launch vehicle configuration, with minor modifications, as used for Vanguard TV-3 and all succeeding Vanguard flights up to and including Vanguard SLV-6.

== Spacecraft ==
Vanguard SLV-3 was to put into orbit the Vanguard 2D satellite, a Lyman Alpha satellite, with a magnetosphere measurement device. The satellite payload was 10.6 kg (23 lb). Vanguard SLV-3 only reached an altitude of 426 km (265 mi), the goal was 3,840 km (2,390 mi) to orbit.

The SLV-3 satellite was a 10.6 kg, 50.8 cm diameter magnesium sphere. The interior was pressurized. The payload instrumentation package was mounted in the center of the sphere. The package was arranged in a cylindrical stack with mercury batteries at the bottom, followed by the Minitrack tracking system electronics, the environment electronics, the telemetering instrumentation, and the experiment electronics. Below the package at the bottom of the sphere was the separation device, a spring loaded tube with a timer designed to push the satellite away from the third stage after orbit was reached. At the top of the interior of the sphere was a pressure gauge. Four 76 cm (30 in) spring-loaded metal rods were folded along the equator of the sphere and would protrude radially outward when deployed, acting as a turnstile antenna. It used two transmitters: a 10 mW transmitter broadcasting at a frequency of 108.00 MHz and a 1 watt transmitter broadcasting at 108.03 MHz. The payload contained two infrared-sensitive photocells designed to scan the cloud cover of Earth.

== Launch ==
An initial launch attempt on 17 September miscarried when a pad umbilical detached prematurely, causing first stage engine shutdown after one inch of vehicle rise. It settled back onto the launcher, but no damage resulted and Vanguard SLV-3 launched successfully on 26 September 1958 at 15:38 GMT. It was launched from Launch Complex 18A (LC-18A) at the Cape Canaveral Air Force Station (CCAFS). Low second stage performance resulted in insufficient velocity for the third stage and payload. They completed one orbit and reached a peak altitude of 426 km (265 mi) before reentering over Central Africa. Investigation concluded that particles from a rubber helium fill hose had clogged a filter in the fuel feed system, resulting in the second stage engine being fuel-starved and operating at only 80% thrust. The fill hose was changed to metal on subsequent flights, the second stage propellant tanks heat-treated to remove scale, and preflight procedures changed to reduce the need to open up the propulsion system and potentially introduce contaminants into it.

== Mission ==
Vanguard SLV-3 was launched from the Atlantic Missile Range in Cape Canaveral, Florida, on 26 September 1958 at 15:38 GMT. Flight was nominal during the liftoff period, but the performance of the second stage was below the anticipated minimum requirement. The third stage fired as planned, although separation from the second stage occurred about 50 seconds early, at 422.7 seconds after launch. The failure of the second stage resulted in a final velocity that was about 75 meters per second (250 feet per second) short of the roughly 7500 mps (25,000 fps) required to reach the planned orbit. The burned out third stage and satellite reached an altitude of almost 425 km (265 miles) before coming back down and burning up on re-entry into the atmosphere. This was believed to have occurred over Central Africa after completion of one orbit. The poor performance of the second stage was concluded to be a result of low fuel flow rate due to contamination from Buna-N rubber particles from the helium fill hose.

== See also ==
- Vanguard rocket
- Project Vanguard
- Comparison of orbital launch systems
- Comparison of orbital rocket engines
- Rocket
- Spacecraft propulsion
