= Vanguard SLV-2 =

Failed rocket launch

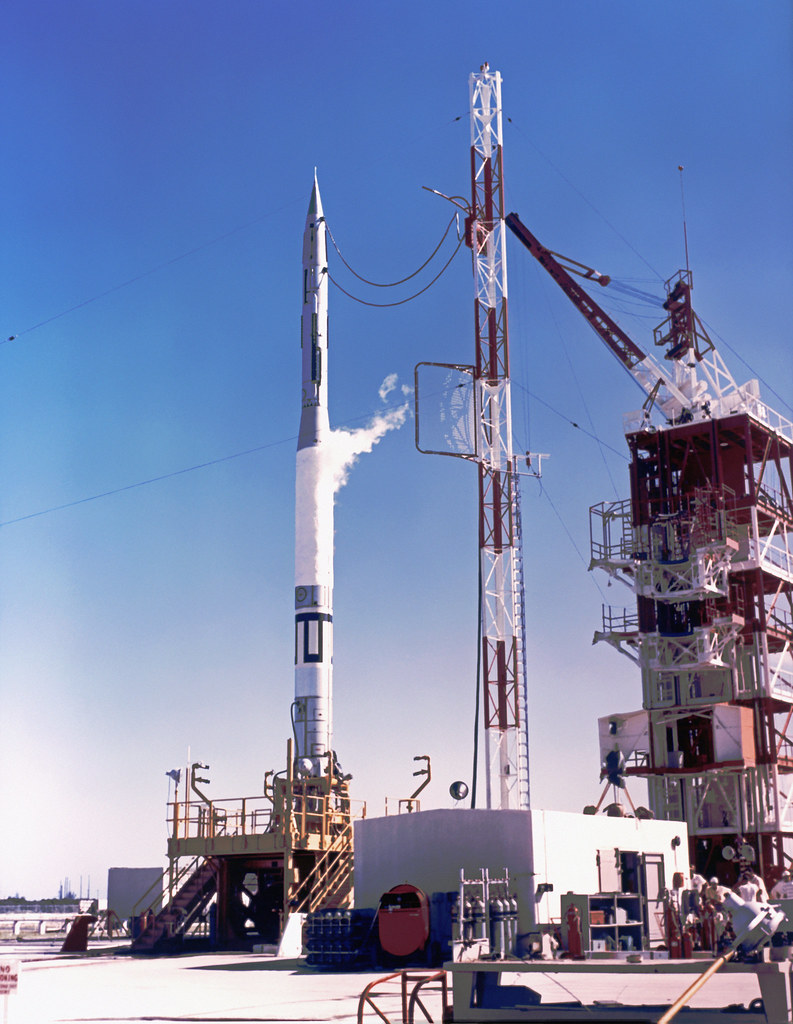
- Vanguard rocket on LC-18A prior to its launch
- Names: Vanguard Space Launch Vehicle-2
- Mission type: International Geophysical Year
- Operator: Naval Research Laboratory
- Mission duration: Failed to orbit

Spacecraft properties
- Spacecraft: Vanguard 2C
- Spacecraft type: Vanguard
- Manufacturer: Naval Research Laboratory
- Launch mass: 9.75 kg (21.5 lb)
- Dimensions: 50.8 cm (20.0 in) of diameter

Start of mission
- Launch date: 26 June 1958, 05:00:52 GMT
- Rocket: Vanguard SLV-2
- Launch site: Cape Canaveral, LC-18A
- Contractor: Glenn L. Martin Company

End of mission
- Decay date: Failed to orbit

Orbital parameters
- Reference system: Geocentric orbit (planned)
- Regime: Medium Earth orbit
- Perigee altitude: 655 km
- Apogee altitude: 3970 km
- Inclination: 34.20°
- Period: 134.0 minutes

Vanguard SLV-2, also called Vanguard Satellite Launch Vehicle-2 hoped to be the second successful flight of the American Vanguard rocket following successful Vanguard 1 satellite on rocket Vanguard TV-4.

== Background ==
Vanguard Satellite Launch Vehicle-2 (SLV-2) was launched on 26 June 1958. The flight failed to reach orbit due to premature cutoff of the second stage rocket engine. The program objective was to launch into orbit a fully instrumented "X-ray and environmental satellite" to study maximum variations in intensity of X-rays from the Sun in the 1 to 8 angstrom wavelength bands and to make certain space environment measurements. The purpose of the IGY Vanguard satellite program, run by the U.S. Navy, was to launch one or more satellites into Earth orbit during the International Geophysical Year (IGY).

== Launch Vehicle ==
Vanguard was the designation used for both the launch vehicle and the satellite. The first stage of the three-stage Vanguard Test vehicle was powered by a General Electric X-405 125,000 N (28,000 lb_{f}) thrust liquid rocket engine, propelled by 7200 kg of kerosene (RP-1) and liquid oxygen, with helium pressurant. It also held 152 kg of hydrogen peroxide. It was finless, 13.4 metres tall, 1.14 metres in diameter, and had a launch mass of approximately 8090 kg.

The second stage was a 5.8 metres high, 0.8 metres diameter Aerojet General AJ-10 liquid engine burning 1520 kg Unsymmetrical dimethylhydrazine (UDMH) and White Inhibited Fuming Nitric Acid (WIFNA) with a helium pressurant tank. It produced a thrust of 32,600 N (7,300 lb_{f}) and had a launch mass of approximately 1990 kg. This stage contained the complete guidance and control system.

A solid-propellant rocket with 10,400 N (2,300 lb_{f}) of thrust (for 30 seconds burn time) was developed by the Grand Central Rocket Company to satisfy third-stage requirements. The stage was 1.5 metres high, 0.8 metres in diameter, and had a launch mass of 194 kg. The thin (0.076 cm) steel casing for the third stage had a hemispherical forward dome with a shaft at the center to support the satellite and an aft dome fairing into a steel exit nozzle.

The total height of the vehicle with the satellite fairing was about 21.9 meters. The payload capacity was 11.3 kg to a 555 km Earth orbit. A nominal launch would have the first stage firing for 144 seconds, bringing the rocket to an altitude of 58 km, followed by the second stage burn of 120 seconds to 480 km, whereupon the third stage would bring the satellite to orbit. This was the same launch vehicle configuration, with minor modifications, as used for Vanguard TV-3 and all succeeding Vanguard flights up to and including Vanguard SLV-6.

== Spacecraft ==
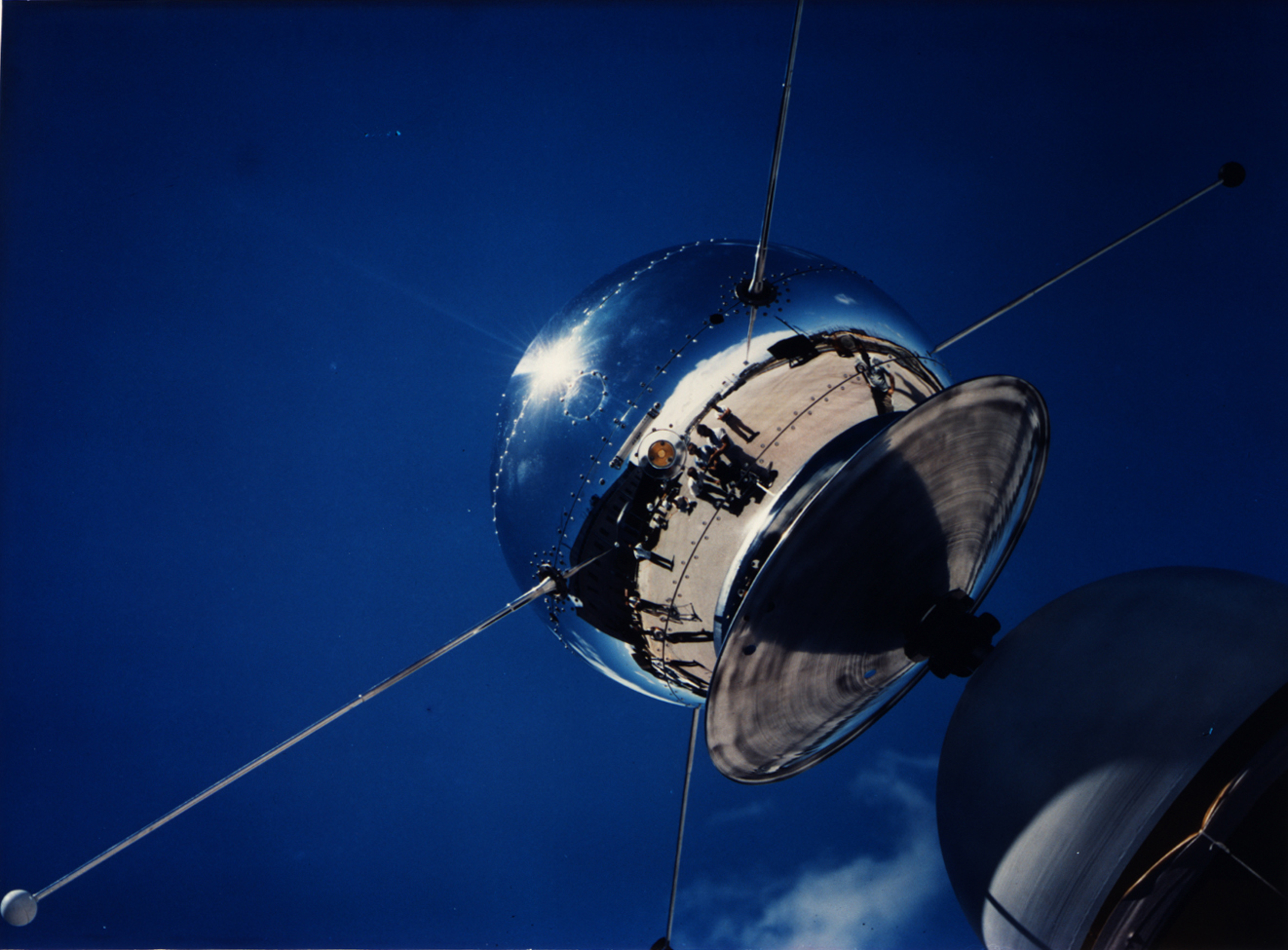
The satellite Vanguard 2C being examined at Cape Canaveral

Vanguard SLV-2 hoped to put into orbit the Vanguard 2C satellite, a Lyman Alpha satellite, with a magnetosphere measurement device. The satellite payload was 9.75 kg (21.5 lb). Vanguard SLV-2 only reached an altitude of 165 km (103 mi), the goal was 3,840 km (2,390 mi) to orbit.

The SLV-2 satellite was a 9.75 kg, 50.8 cm diameter sphere. The spherical shell was magnesium, internally gold-plated and externally covered with an aluminum deposit coated with highly polished silicon monoxide of sufficient thickness to provide thermal control for the instrumentation. The interior was pressurized. The payload instrumentation package was mounted in the center of the sphere. The package was arranged in a cylindrical stack with the mercury batteries at the bottom, followed by the Minitrack tracking system electronics, the environment electronics, the telemetering instrumentation, and the experiment electronics. Below the package at the bottom of the sphere was the separation device, a spring loaded tube with a timer designed to push the satellite away from the third stage after orbit was reached. At the top of the interior of the sphere was a pressure gauge. Four 76 cm (30 in) spring-loaded metal rods were folded along the equator of the sphere and would protrude radially outward when deployed, acting as a turnstile antenna. It used an 80 mW transmitter at a frequency of 108.00 MHz.

== Launch ==
Vanguard SLV-2 launched on 26 June 1958 at 05:00:52 GMT. It was launched from Launch Complex 18A (LC-18A) at the Cape Canaveral Air Force Station (CCAFS). The second stage engine shut down after only 8 seconds of operation, resulting in insufficient velocity to put the satellite into orbit. The investigation concluded that scale from the second stage oxidizer tank had clogged propellant feed lines and resulted in loss of thrust.

== Mission ==
Liftoff was nominal, but low oxidizer feed pressure caused the second stage rocket engine to shut down after firing for only 8 seconds, 152.6 seconds after launch, resulting in insufficient velocity to arm the third stage for firing and causing termination of the flight. The premature shutdown caused the propellant tank pressures to exceed design values without failing, proving the structural integrity of the tankage.

== See also ==
- Comparison of orbital launch systems
- Comparison of orbital rocket engines
- Project Vanguard
- Spacecraft propulsion
