= Vanguard SLV-1 =

Failed rocket launch

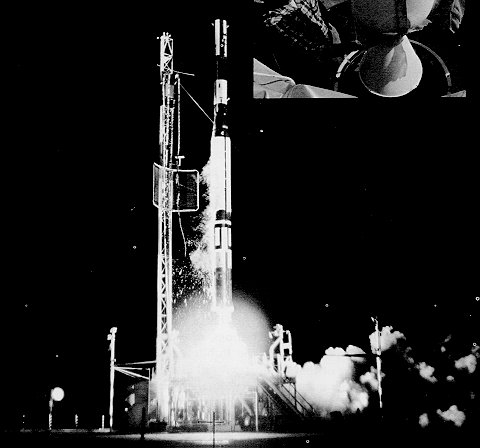
- The launch of Vanguard SLV-1, which failed at second-stage burnout.
- Names: Vanguard Space Launch Vehicle-1
- Mission type: International Geophysical Year
- Operator: Naval Research Laboratory
- Mission duration: Failed to orbit

Spacecraft properties
- Spacecraft: Vanguard 2B
- Spacecraft type: Vanguard
- Manufacturer: Naval Research Laboratory
- Launch mass: 9.75 kg (21.5 lb)
- Dimensions: 50.8 cm (20.0 in) of diameter

Start of mission
- Launch date: 28 May 1958, 03:46:20 GMT
- Rocket: Vanguard SLV-1
- Launch site: Cape Canaveral, LC-18A
- Contractor: Glenn L. Martin Company

End of mission
- Decay date: Failed to orbit

Orbital parameters
- Reference system: Geocentric orbit (planned)
- Regime: Medium Earth orbit
- Perigee altitude: 655 km
- Apogee altitude: 3970 km
- Inclination: 34.20°
- Period: 134.0 minutes

Vanguard SLV-1, also called Vanguard Satellite Launch Vehicle-1 was hoped to be the second successful flight of the American Vanguard rocket following the successful launch of the Vanguard 1 satellite on rocket Vanguard TV-4 in March 1958.

== Background ==
Vanguard Satellite Launch Vehicle-1 (SLV-1) was launched on 27 May 1958. Due to a malfunction in the second stage, the vehicle failed to enter Earth orbit as planned and crashed 12,000 km downrange. The planned program objectives of the satellite were to develop the capability to launch satellites into accurate Earth orbits, to confirm the feasibility of the Vanguard concept, and to study solar Lyman-alpha radiation and the space environment. The purpose of the International Geophysical Year (IGY) Vanguard satellite program, managed by the U.S. Navy, was to launch one or more satellites into Earth orbit during the International Geophysical Year (IGY).

== Launch vehicle ==
Vanguard was the designation used for both the launch vehicle and the satellite. The first stage of the three-stage Vanguard Test vehicle was powered by a General Electric X-405 125,000 N (28,000 lb_{f})) thrust liquid rocket engine, propelled by 7200 kg of kerosene (RP-1) and liquid oxygen, with helium pressurant. It also held 152 kg of hydrogen peroxide. It was finless, 13.4 metres tall, 1.14 metres in diameter, and had a launch mass of approximately 8090 kg.

The second stage was a 5.80 metres high, 0.80 metres diameter Aerojet General AJ-10 liquid engine burning 1520 kg Unsymmetrical dimethylhydrazine (UDMH) and White Inhibited Fuming Nitric Acid (WIFNA) with a helium pressurant tank. It produced a thrust of 32,600 N (7,300 lb_{f}) and had a launch mass of approximately 1990 kg. This stage contained the complete guidance and control system.

A solid-propellant rocket with 10,400 N (2,300 lb_{f}) of thrust (for 30 seconds burn time) was developed by the Grand Central Rocket Company to satisfy third-stage requirements. The stage was 1.5 metres high, 0.8 metres in diameter, and had a launch mass of 194 kg. The thin (0.076 cm) steel casing for the third stage had a hemispherical forward dome with a shaft at the center to support the satellite and an aft dome fairing into a steel exit nozzle.

The total height of the vehicle with the satellite fairing was about 21.9 metres. The payload capacity was 11.3 kg to a 555 km Earth orbit. A nominal launch would have the first stage firing for 144 seconds, bringing the rocket to an altitude of 58 km, followed by the second stage burn of 120 seconds to 480 km, whereupon the third stage would bring the satellite to orbit. This was the same launch vehicle configuration, with minor modifications, as used for Vanguard TV-3 and all succeeding Vanguard flights up to and including Vanguard SLV-6.

== Spacecraft ==
Vanguard SLV-1 carried the Vanguard 2B satellite, equipped with Lyman-alpha ultraviolet detectors and a magnetosphere measurement device.

The SLV-1 satellite was a 9.75 kg, 50.8 cm diameter sphere. The spherical shell was magnesium, internally gold-plated and externally covered with an aluminum deposit coated with highly polished silicon monoxide of sufficient thickness to provide thermal control for the instrumentation. The interior was pressurized. The payload instrumentation package was mounted in the center of the sphere. The package was arranged in a cylindrical stack with the mercury batteries at the bottom, followed by the Minitrack tracking system electronics, the environment electronics, the telemetering instrumentation, and if necessary, the experiment electronics. Below the package at the bottom of the sphere was the separation device, a spring loaded tube with a timer designed to push the satellite away from the third stage after orbit was reached. At the top of the interior of the sphere was a pressure gauge. Four 76 cm (30 in) spring-loaded metal rods were folded along the equator of the sphere and would protrude radially outward when deployed, acting as a turnstile antenna. It used an 80 mW transmitter at a frequency of 108.00 Mhz. The Lyman-alpha detector was mounted on the shell and covered the 1100 to 1300 angstrom bands.

== Launch ==
Vanguard SLV-1 launched on 27 May 1958 at 03:46:20 GMT. It was launched from Launch Complex 18A at the Cape Canaveral Air Force Station. At second stage separation, there was a momentary pitching motion registered by the rate gyros which resulted in an incorrect attitude reference. The second stage placed the third stage on a trajectory approximately 63° up from the intended flight path. It arced upward and reached a peak altitude of 3500 kilometers before reentering and breaking up over South Africa. The pitching motion was deemed to be a rupture in the second stage engine thrust chamber due to high-frequency combustion instability at engine shutdown. On subsequent flights, the second stage was modified to prevent the possibility of an oxidizer-rich shutdown.

== Mission ==
Launch was normal until 261.5 seconds after launch, when the second stage engine did not cut off properly because of an instability resulting from depletion of the oxidizer. The disturbance caused vehicle rotation in the pitch plane to exceed the 10.5° gyroscope limit, resulting in loss of attitude reference to the pitch gyroscope. The remainder of the flight was controlled to a false reference. This caused the vehicle to fly in a nose-upward attitude (63° to horizontal) rather than parallel to Earth at the time the third stage was deployed. This in turn caused the third stage to fly in a high arc-like trajectory, precluding any possibility of orbit. The third stage reached a peak altitude of 3500 km (2200 miles) and traveled 12,000 km (7500 miles) downrange, landing near the east coast of the Union of South Africa.

== See also ==
- Vanguard rocket
- Project Vanguard
- Comparison of orbital launch systems
- Comparison of orbital rocket engines
- Rocket
- Spacecraft propulsion
