= Vanguard 2 =

US Navy satellite launched in 1959

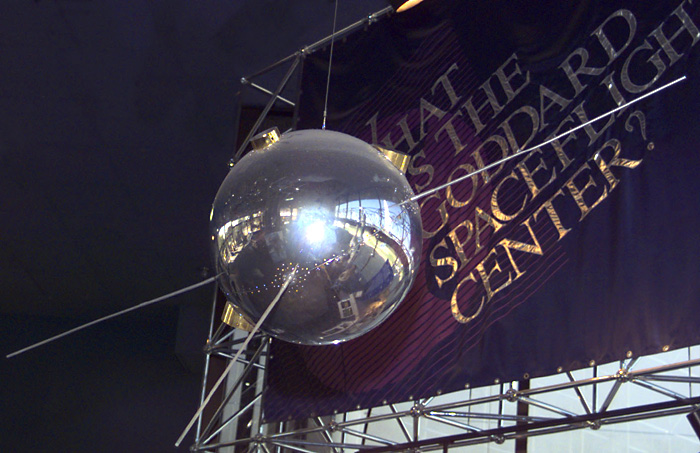
- A model of the Vanguard 2 satellite in front of the Goddard Space Flight Center.
- Names: Vanguard Space Launch Vehicle-4
- Mission type: Weather satellite Air Density Experiment
- Operator: Naval Research Laboratory
- Harvard designation: 1959 Alpha 1
- COSPAR ID: 1959-001A
- SATCAT no.: 00011
- Mission duration: Weather observation: 19 days (achieved); 67 years, 8 months and 18 days (in orbit)

Spacecraft properties
- Spacecraft type: Vanguard 2E
- Bus: Vanguard
- Manufacturer: Naval Research Laboratory
- Launch mass: 10.75 kg (23.7 lb)
- Dimensions: 508 mm (20.0 in) of diameter

Start of mission
- Launch date: 17 February 1959, 15:55:02 GMT
- Rocket: Vanguard SLV-4
- Launch site: Cape Canaveral, LC-18A
- Contractor: Glenn L. Martin Company

End of mission
- Last contact: 15 March 1959
- Decay date: 2259 (estimated); ~ 300 years orbital lifetime

Orbital parameters
- Reference system: Geocentric orbit
- Regime: Medium Earth orbit
- Perigee altitude: 559 km (347 mi)
- Apogee altitude: 3,320 km (2,060 mi)
- Inclination: 32.88°
- Period: 125.80 minutes

Instruments
- Optical scanner Radio beacon

Vanguard 2 (or Vanguard 2E before launch) is an Earth-orbiting satellite launched 17 February 1959 at 15:55:02 GMT, aboard a Vanguard SLV-4 rocket as part of the United States Navy's Project Vanguard. The satellite was designed to measure cloud cover distribution over the daylight portion of its orbit, for a period of 19 days, and to provide information on the density of the atmosphere for the lifetime of its orbit (about 300 years). As the first weather satellite and one of the first orbital space missions, the launch of Vanguard 2 was an important milestone in the Space Race between the United States and the Soviet Union. Vanguard 2 remains in orbit.

The Universal newsreel about Vanguard 2

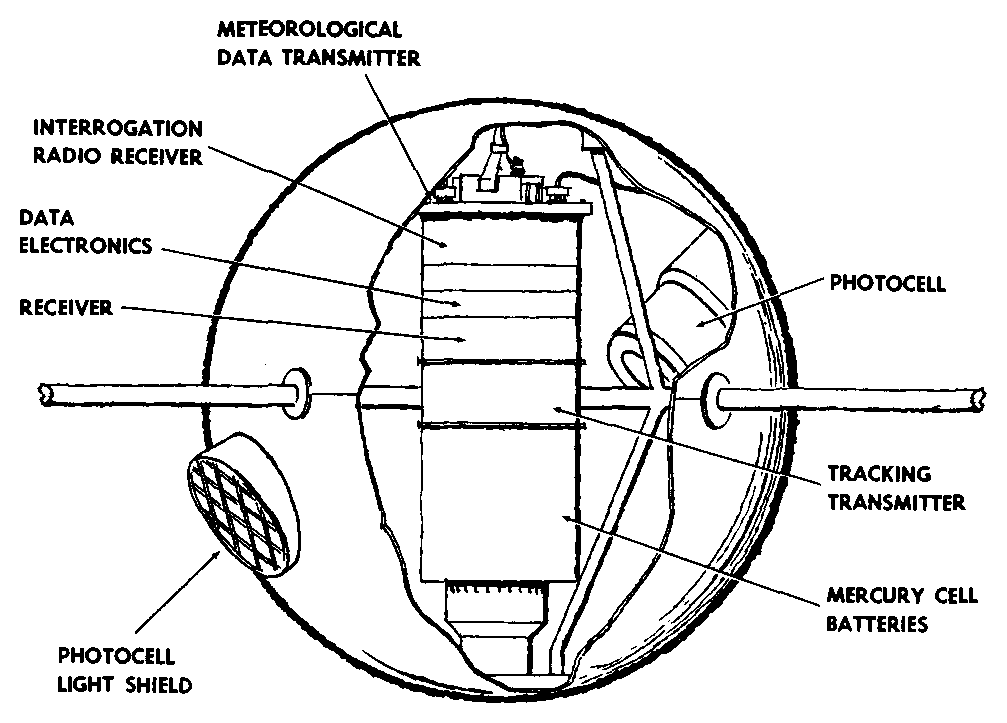
The Vanguard 2 satellite sketch

== Previous satellites ==
Before the successful 1959 launch of the satellite that became known as Vanguard 2, multiple attempted launches of satellites named "Vanguard 2" were made in 1958. All of these launches failed to reach orbit. The satellites that failed to reach orbit were:

- Vanguard 2A: launched 29 April 1958, by the Vanguard TV-5 rocket
- Vanguard 2B: launched 28 May 1958, by the Vanguard SLV-1 rocket
- Vanguard 2C: launched 26 June 1958, by the Vanguard SLV-2 rocket
- Vanguard 2D: launched 26 September 1958, by the Vanguard SLV-3 rocket

The satellite whose launch was successful and that became known as the Vanguard 2 was the Vanguard 2E.

== Spacecraft ==
The spacecraft is a magnesium sphere 508 mm (20.0 in) in diameter. It contains two optical telescopes with two photocells. The sphere was internally gold-plated, and externally covered with an aluminum deposit coated with silicon oxide of sufficient thickness to provide thermal control for the instrumentation.

Radio communication was provided by a 1 watt, 108.03 MHz telemetry transmitter and a 10 mW, 108 MHz beacon transmitter that sent a continuous signal for tracking purposes. A command receiver was used to activate a tape recorder that relayed telescope experiment data to the telemetry transmitter.

The power supply for the instrumentation was provided by mercury batteries.

== Instruments ==
=== Optical scanner ===
The optical scanner experiment was designed to obtain cloud cover data between the equator and 35° to 45° N latitude. As the satellite circled Earth, two photocells, located at the focus of two optical telescopes aimed in diametrically opposite directions, measured the intensity of sunlight reflected from clouds (about 80%), from land masses (15 to 20%), and from sea areas (5%). The satellite motion and rotation caused the photocells to scan the Earth in successive "lines" (akin to a whisk broom scanner). Separate solar batteries turned on a recorder only when the Earth beneath the satellite was in sunlight and about 50 minutes of data per orbit were obtained. The measured reflection intensities were stored on tape. Ground stations interrogated the satellite by signaling its command receiver, which caused the entire tape to be played back in 60 seconds. The tape was then erased and rewound. For the planned 19 days of the weather experiment, the equipment functioned normally. The satellite was spin-stabilized at 50 rpm, but the optical instrument's data was poor because of an unsatisfactory orientation of the spin axis.

=== Satellite drag atmospheric density ===
Because of its symmetrical shape, Vanguard 2 was selected by the experimenters for use in determining upper atmospheric densities as a function of altitude, latitude, season, and solar activity. As the spacecraft continuously orbited, it would lead its predicted positions slightly, accumulating greater and greater advance as it spiraled lower and faster due to the drag of the residual atmosphere. By measuring the rate and timing of orbital shifts, the relevant atmosphere's parameters could be back-calculated knowing the body's drag properties. It was determined that atmospheric pressures, and thus drag and orbital decay, were higher than anticipated, as Earth's upper atmosphere gradually tapered into space.

This experiment was planned in great detail prior to launch. Initial Naval Research Laboratory (NRL) proposals for Project Vanguard included conical satellite bodies; this eliminated the need for a separate fairing and ejection mechanisms, and their associated weight and failure modes. Radio tracking would gather data and establish a position. Early in the program, optical tracking (with a Baker-Nunn camera network and human spotters) was added. A panel of scientists proposed changing the design to spheres, at least 508 mm (20.0 in) in diameter and hopefully 760 mm (30 in). A sphere would have a constant optical reflection, and constant coefficient of drag, based on size alone, while a cone would vary with orientation. James Van Allen proposed a cylinder, which eventually flew as the early Explorer satellites. The Naval Research Lab finally accepted 160 mm (6.3 in) spheres as a "test vehicle", with 508 mm (20.0 in) for follow-on satellites. The payload weight savings, from reduced size as well as decreased instrumentation in the early satellites, was considered acceptable for the initial launches. Afterwards, the later Vanguard rockets had some test instrumentation removed, lightening them enough for the 508 mm bodies.

== Post mission ==
After the scientific mission ended, both Vanguard 2 and the upper stage of the rocket used to launch the satellite became derelict objects that would continue to orbit Earth for many years. Both objects remain in orbit. As Vanguard 1, Vanguard 2, and Vanguard 3 are still orbiting with their drag properties essentially unchanged, they form a baseline data set on the atmosphere of Earth that is over 60 years old and continuing. Vanguard 2 has an expected orbital lifetime of 300 years.

== See also ==
- Timeline of first images of Earth from space
- Vanguard 1
- Sputnik 1
- Sputnik (rocket)
- Weather satellite
- Timeline of artificial satellites and space probes
