= Vanguard TV-2 =

Suborbital rocket test flight

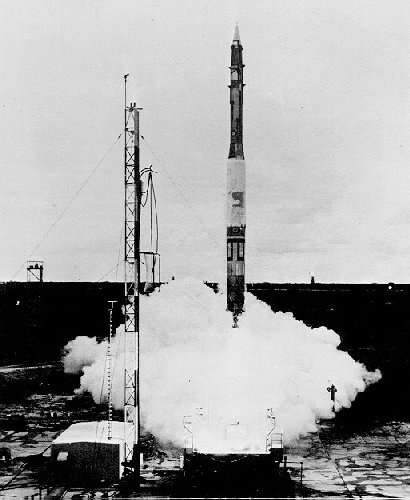
- The launch of the Vanguard TV-2 rocket
- Names: Vanguard Test Vehicle-2; Vanguard Test Vehicle-Two
- Mission type: Vanguard test flight
- Operator: Naval Research Laboratory
- Mission duration: Suborbital flight

Start of mission
- Launch date: 23 October 1957, 06:05 GMT
- Rocket: Vanguard TV-2
- Launch site: Cape Canaveral, LC-18A
- Contractor: Glenn L. Martin Company

End of mission
- Decay date: Suborbital flight

Orbital parameters
- Altitude: 175 km (109 mi)

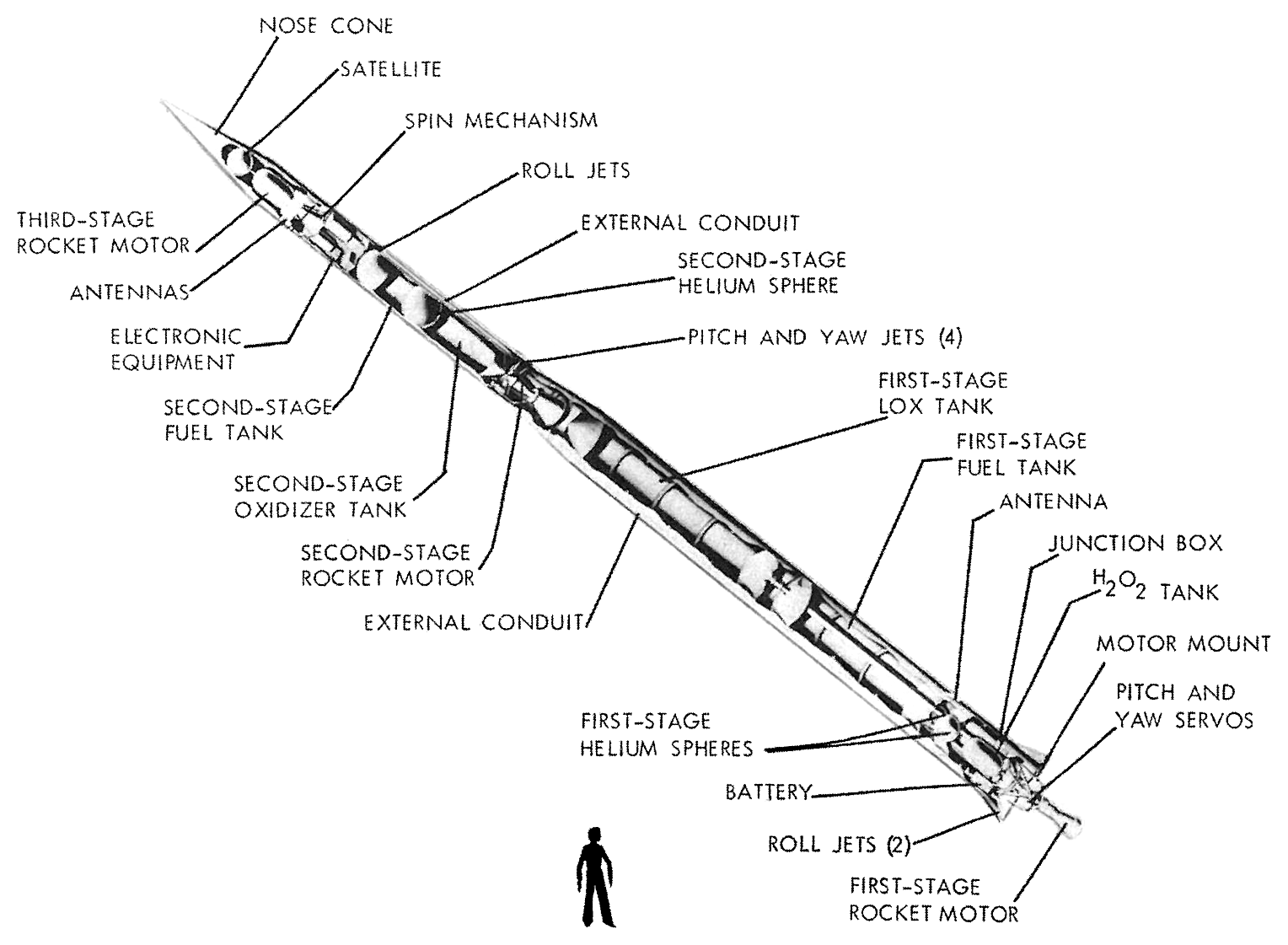
Vanguard rocket cutaway view, TV-2 had no fuel in stage 2 and 3.

Vanguard TV-2, also called Vanguard Test Vehicle-Two, was the third suborbital test flight of Project Vanguard. Successful TV-2 followed the successful launch of Vanguard TV-0 a one-stage rocket launched in December 1956 and Vanguard TV-1 a two-stage rocket launched in May 1957.

Project Vanguard was a program managed by the United States Naval Research Laboratory (NRL), and designed and built by the Glenn L. Martin Company (now Lockheed-Martin), which intended to launch the first artificial satellite into Earth orbit using a Vanguard rocket. as the launch vehicle from Cape Canaveral Missile Annex, Florida.

Vanguard TV-2 arrived at Cape Canaveral in June 1957. Vanguard TV-2 was a prototype as it had a liquid rocket first stage, a dummy (no fuel) second stage, and a dummy (no fuel) third stage. Three Vanguard stages were needed to put a satellite in orbit, the final goal of the Vanguard project. Since stage two and three had no power the test flight would not achieve the same height as Vanguard TV-1.

Vanguard TV-2 lifted off on 23 October 1957 from Cape Canaveral from launch pad LC-18A. Launch pad 18A was an older Viking launch stand that was shipped from White Sands Missile Range for use at the Cape Canaveral. Pad 18A was also used on Vanguard TV-0 and TV-1. The goal of TV-2 was to test the final Vanguard first stage, as well as to test the retrorocket system of stage two and spin-up of stage three. Also new to test on TV-2 flight was a super high frequency (SHF) C-band radio beacon on the rocket and ground tracking radar gear, used to track proper propulsion and trajectory. The telemetry was picked up at the Air Force Missile Test Center's (AFMTC) tracking station.

Vanguard TV-2 was successful, the three stage rocket achieved an altitude of 175 km (109 mi), a down range of 539 km (335 mi), and a top speed of 6,840 km/h (4,250 mph). TV-2 landed in the Atlantic Ocean. First and second stage separated on time, all controls and tracking worked. The only problems TV-2 had were on the ground getting ready for the flight as there were many delays. TV-2 was shipped to the Cape not working (agreed and known by all parties). It took from early June to late October in 1957 at the Cape to work out all the problems that were not fixed in the manufacturing. For contrast, TV-1 arrived at the cape in February 1957 and lifted off on 1 May 1957. The delay of TV-2 along with the failure of TV-3, put the United States behind in the Space Race. On 4 October 1957, 19 days before TV-2's lift off, a Soviet Union Sputnik rocket was used to perform the world's first satellite launch, taking away some of the joy of TV-2's success.

== Background ==
Vanguard TV-0, Vanguard TV-1 and Vanguard TV-2 success was an important part of the Space Race. The Space Race started between United States and the Soviet Union at the end of World War II, as a race began to retrieve as many V-2 rockets and Nazi Germany V-2 staff as possible. Three hundred rail-car loads of V-2 rocket weapons and parts were captured and shipped to the United States, also 126 of the principal designers of the V-2, including Wernher von Braun and Walter Dornberger, went to America. Von Braun, his brother Magnus von Braun, and seven others decided to surrender to the United States military in Operation Paperclip to ensure they were not captured by the advancing Soviets or shot dead by the Nazis to prevent their capture. Thus the V-2 program started the Space Race, the V-2 could not orbit, but could reach a height of 88 km (55 mi) on long range trajectory and up to 206 km (128 mi) if launched vertically.

Due to problems a delays with Vanguard TV-2 and failure of TV-3, Vanguard was not the first rocket to place into orbit an unmanned satellite. The first small-lift launch vehicle was the Sputnik rocket, it put into orbit an unmanned orbital carrier rocket designed by Sergei Korolev in the Soviet Union, derived from the R-7 Semyorka ICBM. On 4 October 1957, the Sputnik rocket was used to perform the world's first satellite launch, placing Sputnik 1 satellite into a low Earth orbit.

The U.S. later responded by launching the Vanguard TV-4 with Vanguard 1 satellite. that was intended to be the first launch vehicle the United States would use to place a satellite into orbit. Instead, the Sputnik crisis caused by the surprise launch of Sputnik 1 led the U.S., after the failure of Vanguard TV-3, to quickly orbit the Explorer 1 satellite using a Juno I rocket launched on 1 February 1958. Thus Vanguard 1 was the second successful U.S. orbital launch. Thus started the Space Race, that gave the drive to put men on the Moon with the Apollo program.

== See also ==
- Vanguard rocket
- Project Vanguard
- Comparison of orbital launch systems
- Comparison of orbital rocket engines
- Rocket
- Spacecraft propulsion
