= Vanguard SLV-6 =

Failed rocket launch

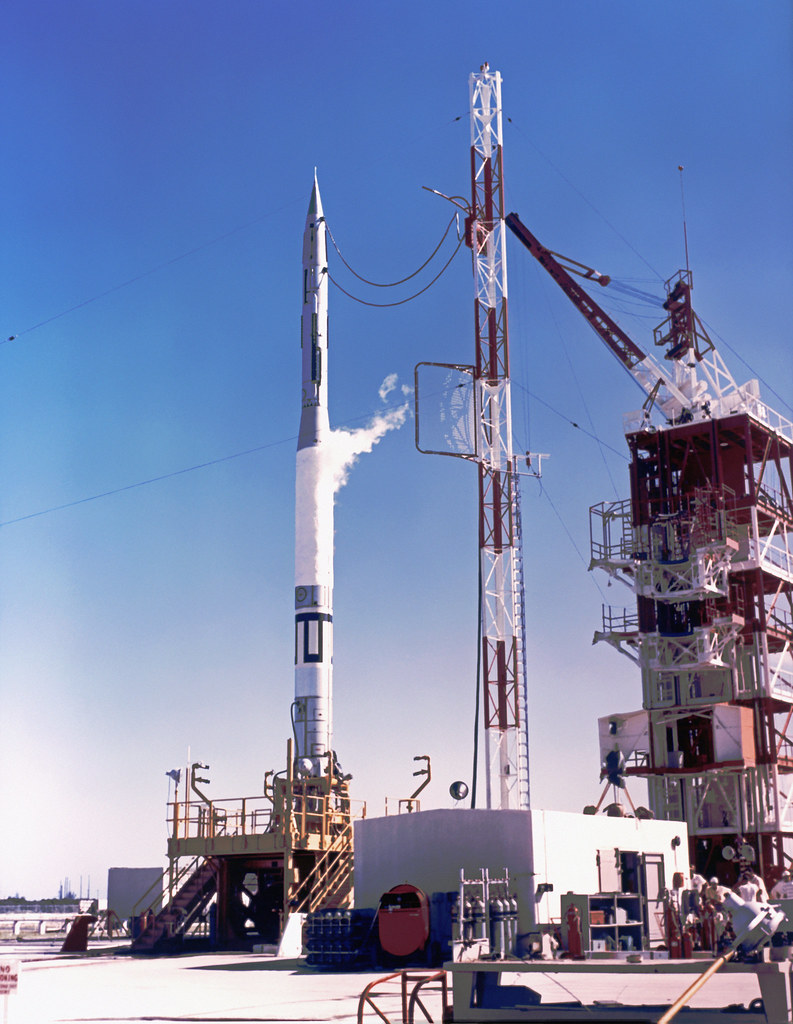
- Vanguard rocket on LC-18A prior to its launch
- Names: Vanguard Space Launch Vehicle-Six
- Mission type: Solar heating of Earth
- Operator: Naval Research Laboratory
- Mission duration: Failed to orbit

Spacecraft properties
- Spacecraft: Vanguard 3B
- Spacecraft type: Vanguard
- Manufacturer: Naval Research Laboratory
- Launch mass: 10.8 kg (24 lb)
- Dimensions: 50.8 cm (20.0 in) of diameter

Start of mission
- Launch date: 22 June 1959, 20:16:09 GMT
- Rocket: Vanguard SLV-6
- Launch site: Cape Canaveral, LC-18A
- Contractor: Glenn L. Martin Company

End of mission
- Decay date: Failed to orbit

Orbital parameters
- Reference system: Geocentric orbit (planned)
- Regime: Medium Earth orbit
- Perigee altitude: 655 km
- Apogee altitude: 3840 km
- Inclination: 34.20°
- Period: 134.0 minutes

Vanguard SLV-6, also called Vanguard Satellite Launch Vehicle-Six, hoped to be the third successful flight of the American Vanguard rocket following the successful Vanguard 2 satellite on rocket Vanguard SLV-4. Vanguard Satellite Launch Vehicle-6 (SLV-6) was designed to carry a small spherical satellite into Earth orbit to study solar heating of Earth and the heat balance. A faulty second stage pressure valve caused a mission failure.

== Launch vehicle ==
Vanguard was the designation used for both the launch vehicle and the satellite. The first stage of the three-stage Vanguard Test Vehicle was powered by a General Electric X-405 125,000 N (28,000 lb_{f}) thrust liquid rocket engine, propelled by kerosene (RP-1) and liquid oxygen, with helium pressurant. It was finless, 13.4 m (44 ft) tall, 1.14 m (3 ft 9 in) in diameter, and had a launch mass of approximately 8,180 kg (18,030 lb).

The second stage was a 5.8 m (19 ft) high, 0.8 m (2 ft 7 in) of diameter Aerojet General AJ-10 liquid engine burning Unsymmetrical dimethylhydrazine (UDMH) and White Inhibited Fuming Nitric Acid (WIFNA) with a helium pressurant tank. It produced a thrust of 33,300 N (7,500 lb_{f}) and had a launch mass of approximately 1,980 kg (4,370 lb). This stage contained the complete guidance and control system.

A solid-propellant rocket with 10,400 N (2,300 lb_{f}) of thrust (for 30 seconds burn time) was developed by the Grand Central Rocket Company to satisfy third-stage requirements. The stage was 1.5 m (4 ft 11 in) high, 0.8 m (2 ft 7 in) in diameter, and had a launch mass of 194 kg (428 lb). The thin 0.076 cm (0.030 in) steel casing for the third stage had a hemispherical forward dome with a shaft at the center to support the satellite and an aft dome fairing into a steel exit nozzle.

The total height of the vehicle with the satellite fairing was about 21.9 m (72 ft). The payload capacity was 11.3 kg (25 lb) to a 555 km (345 mi) Earth orbit. A nominal launch would have the first stage bringing the rocket to an altitude of 58 km (36 mi), followed by the second stage to 480 km (300 mi), whereupon the third stage would bring the satellite to orbit. This was the same launch vehicle configuration, with minor modifications, as used for Vanguard TV-3 and all succeeding Vanguard flights up to this one.

== Spacecraft ==
The SLV-6 satellite was a 10.8 kg (24 lb), 50.8 cm (20.0 in) of diameter sphere. The shell was composed of magnesium alloy and the interior was pressurized. The payload instrumentation package was mounted in the center of the sphere. The package was arranged in a cylindrical stack with mercury batteries at the bottom, followed by the Minitrack tracking system electronics, the environment electronics, the telemetering instrumentation, and the experiment electronics. Below the package at the bottom of the sphere was the separation device, a spring loaded tube with a timer designed to push the satellite away from the third stage after orbit was reached. At the top of the interior of the sphere was a pressure gauge. Four 76.2 cm (30.0 in) spring-loaded metal rods were folded along the equator of the sphere and would protrude radially outward when deployed, acting as a turnstile antenna. Mounted at the end of each antenna rod was a thermistor to measure solar heating processes. Two transmitters were used, one of 10 mW broadcasting at 108.00 MHz and one of 100 mW at 108.03 MHz.

== Launch ==
Vanguard SLV-6 launched on 22 June 1959 at 20:16:09 GMT. It was launched from Launch Complex 18A (LC-18A) at the Cape Canaveral Air Force Station (CCAFS). The second stage helium control bottle valve failed to open properly at engine start. Tank and chamber pressures rapidly decayed during second stage burn, and 40 seconds after engine start, the helium bottle ruptured due to pressure buildup. The third stage then separated and ignited, driving itself and the satellite into the Atlantic Ocean 500 km (310 mi) downrange.

== See also ==
- Vanguard rocket
- Project Vanguard
- Comparison of orbital launch systems
- Comparison of orbital rocket engines
- Rocket
- Spacecraft propulsion
