= Vanguard TV-1 =

Rocket as a part of Project Vanguard

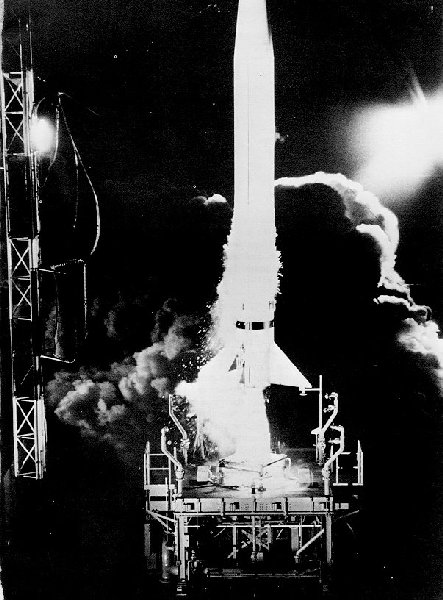
- The launch of the Vanguard TV-1 rocket
- Names: Vanguard Test Vehicle-1; Vanguard Test Vehicle-One
- Mission type: Vanguard test flight
- Operator: Naval Research Laboratory
- Mission duration: Suborbital flight

Start of mission
- Launch date: 1 May 1957, 06:09 GMT
- Rocket: Vanguard TV-1
- Launch site: Cape Canaveral, LC-18A
- Contractor: Glenn L. Martin Company

End of mission
- Decay date: Suborbital flight

Orbital parameters
- Altitude: 203.6 km (126.5 mi)

Vanguard TV-1, also called Vanguard Test Vehicle-One, was the second sub-orbital test flight of a Vanguard rocket as part of the Project Vanguard. Vanguard TV-1 followed the successful launch of Vanguard TV-0 a one-stage rocket launched in December 1956.

Project Vanguard was a program managed by the United States Naval Research Laboratory (NRL), and designed and built by the Glenn L. Martin Company (now Lockheed-Martin), which intended to launch the first artificial satellite into Earth orbit using a Vanguard rocket as the launch vehicle from Cape Canaveral Missile Annex, Florida.

Vanguard TV-1 arrived at Cape Canaveral in February 1957. TV-1 was a two-stage rocket. Vanguard TV-1 used a liquid rocket from a modified Viking rocket for the first stage. The second stage was made by Grand Central Rocket Company. The second stage was a prototype solid-propellant rocket. This solid-propellant second stage later became the third stage of the final three-stage Vanguard vehicle.

Vanguard TV-1 lifted off on 1 May 1957 at 01:29local time (06:29 GMT) from Cape Canaveral from launch pad LC-18A. Launch pad 18A was an older Viking launch stand that was shipped from White Sands Missile Range for use at the Cape Canaveral. Pad 18A was also used on Vanguard Test Vehicle-Zero (Vanguard TV-0).

The main goal of Vanguard TV-1 was to test the solid-propellant rocket. The solid-propellant rocket needed to spin-up, separate from the first-stage booster, ignite, provide a proper propulsion and trajectory. Another goal was to test the techniques and equipment used to launch and track the rocket. The telemetry received during flight would record the proper propulsion and trajectory. The telemetry was picked up at the Air Force Missile Test Center's (AFMTC) tracking station. Vanguard TV-1 was successful, the two stage rocket achieved an altitude of 195 km (121 mi) and a down range of 726 km (451 mi), landing in the Atlantic Ocean.

With Vanguard TV-0 and Vanguard TV-1 success, the next sub-orbital test flight, Vanguard TV-2, was launched in October 1957.

== Background ==
Vanguard TV-0 and Vanguard TV-1 success was an important part of the Space Race. The Space Race started between United States and the Soviet Union at the end of World War II, as a race began to retrieve as many V-2 rockets and Nazi Germany V-2 staff as possible. Three hundred rail-car loads of V-2 rocket weapons and parts were captured and shipped to the United States, also 126 of the principal designers of the V-2, including Wernher von Braun and Walter Dornberger, went to America. Von Braun, his brother Magnus von Braun, and seven others decided to surrender to the United States military in Operation Paperclip to ensure they were not captured by the advancing Soviets or shot dead by the Nazis to prevent their capture. Thus the V-2 program started the Space Race, the V-2 could not orbit, but could reach a height of 88 km (55 mi) on long range trajectory and up to 206 km (128 mi) if launched vertically.

Due to later problems with Vanguard it was not the first rocket to put into orbit an unmanned satellite. The first small-lift launch vehicle was the Sputnik rocket, it put into orbit an unmanned orbital carrier rocket designed by Sergei Korolev in the Soviet Union, derived from the R-7 Semyorka ICBM. On 4 October 1957, the Sputnik rocket was used to perform the world's first satellite launch, placing Sputnik 1 satellite into a low Earth orbit.

The United States responded by launching the Vanguard rocket, that was intended to be the first launch vehicle the United States would use to place a satellite into orbit. Instead, the Sputnik crisis caused by the surprise launch of Sputnik 1 led the U.S., after the failure of Vanguard TV-3, to quickly orbit the Explorer 1 satellite using a Juno I rocket launched on 1 February 1958. Thus Vanguard 1 was the second successful U.S. orbital launch. Thus started the Space Race, that gave the drive to put men on the Moon with the Apollo program.

== See also ==
- Vanguard rocket
- Project Vanguard
- Comparison of orbital launch systems
- Comparison of orbital rocket engines
- Rocket
- Spacecraft propulsion
