= Vanguard TV-0 =

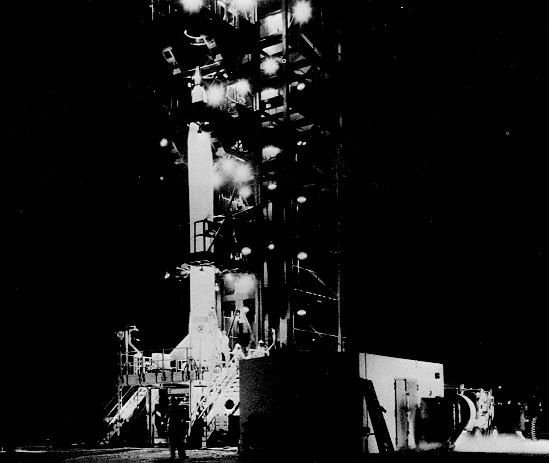
- The launch of the Vanguard TV-0 rocket
- Names: Vanguard Test Vehicle-0; Vanguard Test Vehicle-Zero
- Mission type: Vanguard test flight
- Operator: Naval Research Laboratory
- Mission duration: Suborbital flight

Start of mission
- Launch date: 8 December 1956, 06:05 GMT
- Rocket: Vanguard TV-0
- Launch site: Cape Canaveral, LC-18A
- Contractor: Glenn L. Martin Company

End of mission
- Decay date: Suborbital flight

Orbital parameters
- Altitude: 203.6 km (126.5 mi)

Vanguard TV-0, also called Vanguard Test Vehicle-Zero, was the first sub-orbital test flight of a Viking rocket as part of the Project Vanguard.

Project Vanguard was a program managed by the United States Naval Research Laboratory (NRL), and designed and built by the Glenn L. Martin Company (now Lockheed-Martin), which intended to launch the first artificial satellite into Earth orbit using a Vanguard rocket, powered by a basic design for large liquid rockets. as the launch vehicle from Cape Canaveral Missile Annex, Florida.

== Background ==
Vanguard TV-0's success was an important part of the Space Race. The Space Race started between United States and the Soviet Union at the end of World War II, as a race began to retrieve as many V-2 rockets and Nazi Germany V-2 staff as possible. Three hundred rail-car loads of V-2 rocket weapons and parts were captured and shipped to the United States, also 126 of the principal designers of the V-2, including Wernher von Braun and Walter Dornberger, went to America. von Braun, his brother Magnus von Braun, and seven others decided to surrender to the United States military in Operation Paperclip to ensure they were not captured by the advancing Soviets or shot dead by the Nazis to prevent their capture. Thus the V-2 program started the Space Race, the V-2 could not orbit, but could reach a height of 88 km (55 mi) on long range trajectory and up to 206 km (128 mi) if launched vertically.

Due to later problems with Vanguard it was not the first rocket to put into orbit an unmanned satellite. The first small-lift launch vehicle was the Sputnik rocket, it put into orbit an unmanned orbital carrier rocket designed by Sergei Korolev in the Soviet Union, derived from the R-7 Semyorka ICBM. On 4 October 1957, the Sputnik rocket was used to perform the world's first satellite launch, placing Sputnik 1 satellite into a low Earth orbit.

The United States responded by launching the Vanguard rocket, that was intended to be the first launch vehicle the United States would use to place a satellite into orbit. Instead, the Sputnik crisis caused by the surprise launch of Sputnik 1 led the U.S., after the failure of Vanguard TV-3, to quickly orbit the Explorer 1 satellite using a Juno I rocket launched on 1 February 1958. Thus Vanguard 1 was the second successful U.S. orbital launch. Thus started the Space Race, that gave the drive to put men on the Moon with the Apollo program.

== Launch ==
Ordinarily the countdown began five hours before launch at T-300 minutes. At T-255 minutes, the technicians turned on the satellite and checked it. At T-95 minutes, liquid oxygen (LOX) began pouring into the oxidizer tanks of the vehicle. At T-65 minutes, the gantry crane retired from the flight firing structure. At T-3 minutes, the time-unit ped for the countdown changed to seconds (T-180 seconds), and instrumentation men shifted the telemetry, radar beacons, and command receivers to internal power. At T-30 seconds, the cooling-air umbilical dropped and the LOX-vents on the vehicle closed. At T-0, the fire switch closed, the electrical umbilical dropped from the vehicle, and about six seconds later (T+6), if all was well, the vehicle lifted off.

In October 1956, Viking 13, refurbished and renamed Vanguard Test Vehicle-Zero, or TV-0, arrived at Cape Canaveral. In November 1956, it was transported to pad 18A. Vanguard TV-0 was only a one-stage test flight. It was launched on 8 December 1956 at 01:05 local time (06:05 GMT) at Cape Canaveral from launch pad LC-18A. A Viking launch stand was shipped from White Sands Missile Range for use at the Cape Canaveral. The one-stage test flight was to prepare for the late launch of the full three-stage Vanguard. One of the goals of the test was to test the new Minitrack transmitter used as part of the tracking systems. Shortly after two minutes after lift off a small telemetry antennas unrolled from the rocket transmitting an oscillator's beep. The beep was picked up at the Air Force Missile Test Center's (AFMTC) tracking station.

Vanguard TV-0 was very successful, the one-stage rocket achieved an altitude of 203.6 km (126.5 mi) and a down range of 157.1 km (97.6 mi), landing in the Atlantic Ocean. Vanguard TV-0 was followed by Vanguard TV-1. Vanguard TV-1 was a successful two-stage prototype rocket. With Vanguard TV-0 success, the next suborbital test flight, Vanguard TV-1, was launched in May 1957.

== See also ==
- Vanguard rocket
- Project Vanguard
- Comparison of orbital launch systems
- Comparison of orbital rocket engines
- Rocket
- Spacecraft propulsion
