= XLR50 =

Vanguard rocket engine developed by General Electric

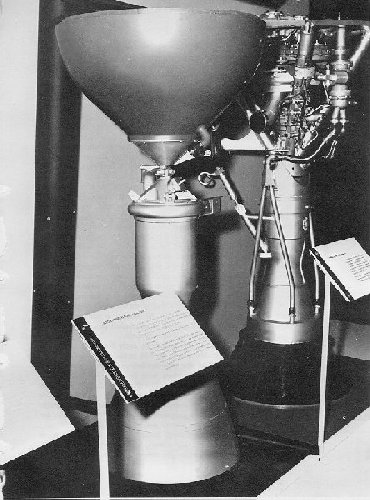
- Vanguard rocket engines: rear, GE's first-stage engine; foreground, Aerojet General's second-stage engine.
- Country of origin: United States
- Date: 1957
- Manufacturer: General Electric
- Application: First stage
- Associated LV: Vanguard
- Predecessor: General Electric Hermes A-3B
- Status: Retired

Liquid-fuel engine
- Propellant: LOX / RP-1
- Cycle: Gas-generator

Configuration
- Chamber: 1
- Nozzle ratio: 5.5

Performance
- Thrust, vacuum: 134.8 kN (30,300 lb_{f})
- Thrust, sea-level: 123.8 kN (27,800 lb_{f})
- Chamber pressure: 4.2 MPa (610 psi)
- Specific impulse, vacuum: 270 s (2.6 km/s)
- Specific impulse, sea-level: 248 s (2.43 km/s)
- Burn time: 145 seconds

Dimensions
- Diameter: 1.14 m (3 ft 9 in)
- Dry mass: 191 kg (421 lb)

Used in
- Vanguard first stage

The XLR50 was a pump-fed liquid-propellant rocket engine burning RP-1 and LOX in a gas generator cycle developed by General Electric. It was used to power the first stage of the Vanguard rockets on the Vanguard project. As was common to engines based on the V-2 experience, the turbine was driven by steam generated by catalytic decomposition of H_{2}O_{2} and the combustion chamber was regeneratively cooled. The engine was gimbaled to supply thrust vectoring. Also, the exhaust gases of the turbine were ducted to dual auxiliary nozzles that acted as verniers to enable roll control of the rocket.

When the Vanguard rocket was selected as the first orbital launch vehicle for the US, Martin Company got the contract as prime contractor. Given the required thrust levels, the Viking propulsion (the Reaction Motors XLR10) was deemed insufficient, and instead, the General Electric proposal, based on the experience gained in the Hermes program, was considered more fitting and a less risky choice than Reaction Motors next project. Thus, on October 1, 1955 Martin purchase order 55-3516-CP was signed with General Electric for the X-405 engine for furnishing a self-contained unit which was to include the thrust structure, gimbal ring, engine components, and engine starting equipment.

While the first two Vanguard flight, (TV-0 and TV-1), used Viking first stages, twelve X-405 were built and eleven flew on Vanguard rockets.
