= Lockheed Propulsion Company =

Division of Lockheed Aircraft Corporation

The Lockheed Propulsion Company was a division of the Lockheed Aircraft Corporation located at 1500 Crafton Avenue in the Mentone, California area northeast of Redlands, California, adjacent to the Santa Ana River, from 1961 to 1975. It developed, tested and produced solid rocket motors and propellant used in military and National Aeronautics and Space Administration applications.

The site consists of approximately 400 acres which was leased from the City of Redlands. The predecessor Grand Central Rocket Company facility was used for the production, testing and disposal of solid rocket propellant used in rocket engines. Lockheed used the facility for research and for production of solid fuel rockets for military and commercial use until 1974.

== History ==
The Lockheed Propulsion Company was founded in 1952 as the Grand Central Rocket Company by Major C. C. Moseley, co-founder of Western Airlines and Charles E. Bartley, the inventor of rubber-based solid rocket fuel propellants.

The company announced on 22 December 1953, that a plant for manufacturing solid fuel rocket propellant would be built in the Redlands-Mentone area, and that negotiations with the Redlands City Council for 160 acres of city-owned land in East Lugonia were underway. The facility was expected to begin operation within 90 days. At the outset, 53 highly skilled technicians would be employed.

In 1954, the company began operations at a 1,100 acre (?) site in the Mentone area. By 1956, the firm had 130 employees, and was expanding, said President Charles E. Bartley.

The U.S. Navy announced on 5 April 1956 that Grand Central Rocket Co. had been selected to build the solid-propellant third-stage rocket for Project Vanguard.

Local residents reported explosions at the plant on occasion. One such case occurred at 6:55 p.m., according to the Redlands police, on 24 January 1957. The San Bernardino Sheriff's office stated that it was just another "prepared test explosion." Company officials would not elaborate, saying only it was a controlled testing procedure.

The Redlands plant provided the ABL X-248 Altair third stage of the Vanguard 1 satellite launch vehicle in 1958. Vanguard 1 and this upper stage remain in orbit, making them the oldest still-in-orbit artificial satellites. Grand Central signed a contract to produce the solid rocket motor for the Project Mercury escape tower. This motor was ultimately produced by Lockheed when the Redlands plant was sold to Lockheed Aircraft Corporation.

Grand Central was acquired by Lockheed in February 1960 to become the Lockheed Propulsion Company as a research and production facility of solid fuel rockets and solid rocket propellant.

On 8 September 1964, LPC President Robert F. Hurt launched a Zero Defects Program, aiming at a goal of defect-free performance in all phases of LPC operation. Representatives of Southern California firms supplying the company met at the Redlands headquarters on 16 September and were urged to pledge their support of the program. Copies of the Zero Defects Program were distributed to company representatives and were being sent to each of the company’s major suppliers across the country.

Between 1966 and 1975, the Boeing Company sub-contracted with Lockheed Propulsion Company for propellants used in the AGM-69 short-range attack missile.

For the Apollo program, Lockheed Propulsion Company provided both the Launch Escape Motor and the Pitch Control Motor of the emergency escape tower atop the Apollo command module, using propellant made of polysulfides.

On 27 January 1972, the Marshall Spaceflight Center selected Aerojet-General, Lockheed Propulsion Company, Thiokol Chemical Company, and United Technology Center to study the use of 120-inch and 156-inch solid motors as part of the Space Shuttle booster package. Thiokol was ultimately selected as the solid rocket booster provider on 20 November 1973. In January 1974, Lockheed protested to the General Accounting Office (GAO) NASA's selection of Thiokol as designer of the SRB. Because of the protest, NASA issued Thiokol a 90-day study contract on 13 February so the firm could continue its work while GAO studied the situation. The study contract was extended again on 20 May for 45 days. In May 1975, NASA confirmed the Thiokol SRB contract.

With the end of the Apollo project contracts, and no orders for the Space Shuttle program, as well as the conclusion of the AGM-69 SRAM project, Lockheed Propulsion Company was closed and sold in 1975.

== Environmental pollution ==
"In the 1980s, trichloroethylene (TCE), a solvent, was detected in four out of twelve groundwater wells sampled in the Redlands area. The Division of Drinking Water and Environmental Management (DDW) within the California Department of Health Services CDHS, directed that any drinking water wells which contained TCE at levels exceeding 5 parts per billion (ppb) or the maximum contaminant level (MCL), be taken off-line. In 1989, as a result of the TCE contamination, the California Regional Water Quality Control Board (CRWQCB), Santa Ana Region, and the Department of Toxic Substance Control (DTSC) provided funding for the installation of a Liquid Phase Granular Activated Carbon (GAC) groundwater treatment system to treat and clean the water from the TCE impacted wells. Subsequent investigations by the CRWQCB determined that Lockheed Martin Corporation (formerly Lockheed Propulsion Company) was the source of the TCE contamination. TCE had been the primary contaminant of concern emanating from the Lockheed site, until mid-1997 when the first tests for perchlorate in drinking water were performed."

In 1997, ammonium perchlorate was discovered in a number of domestic water supply wells that serve several water purveyors throughout San Bernardino and Riverside counties. Two of the wells in the City of Loma Linda's municipal drinking water system had been impacted by the perchlorate groundwater plume, originating from the Lockheed site. Perchlorate adversely affects human health by interfering with iodine uptake into the thyroid gland. In adults, the thyroid gland helps regulate the metabolism by releasing hormones, while in children, the thyroid helps in proper development.

Some 800 residents in the Redlands community subsequently filed suit against Lockheed, alleging that the groundwater contamination had caused health problems. The California Supreme Court, in a landmark ruling in 2003, however, found that the citizens of Redlands, had no basis for filing a class action toxic tort lawsuit against the Lockheed Martin Corporation. The ruling in Carrillo v. Lockheed Martin both clarified the terms upon which mass medical tort claims may be filed, and debunked the increasingly common notion that "medical monitoring" is always a reasonable response when people are exposed to hazardous chemicals.

Nonetheless, the Lockheed-Martin Corporation, successor to Lockheed Aircraft Corporation, has resisted efforts to make it pay for the clean-up of the contamination. Federal policies allowed for burning toxic chemical waste in open, unlined dirt pits during the 1970s, according to a lawsuit that Lockheed Martin Corp. filed against the U.S. government. Lockheed reported more than $500 million in liabilities companywide from "environmental matters," which include soil and groundwater contamination in Redlands and unrelated projects, according to SEC filings. In a suit filed on 1 July 2008, the company wants the government to pay past cleanup costs and to be held liable for future expenses. A Lockheed spokeswoman declined to comment on the company's lawsuit, filed Tuesday in federal court in the District of Columbia. The lawsuit doesn't say how much money the company is seeking.
