= Minitrack =

The Minitrack Network was the first U.S. satellite tracking network to become operational, in 1957. It was used to track the flights of Sputnik, Vanguard, Explorer, and other early space efforts. Minitrack was the progenitor of Spacecraft Tracking and Data Acquisition Network (STADAN) and the Manned Space Flight Network (MSFN).

== Origins ==
When the proposals for satellites floated in the mid 1950s, the question of tracking them naturally arose. Three approaches were considered:

- Optical tracking
- Use of radar
- A scheme from the United States Naval Research Laboratory (NRL) that measured angles using interferometry, based on work at the White Sands Missile Range.

The optical and radar approaches did not require a cooperative target, but had the major problem of acquisition, or finding the target in the first place, since they had very small fields of view. The NRL proposal needed a transmitter on the target, but could easily measure a target anywhere in a wide field of view. The NRL proposal was accepted and turned into the basis of the Minitrack stations.

From a NASA history document:

In early April 1955, Milton Rosen, John Mengel, and Roger Easton assembled informally at NRL and generated a document entitled, "Proposal for Minimum Trackable Satellite (Minitrack)". No date and no authors are listed on this key report; but, according to Rosen, it preceded only by a few days a more formal report with the title, "A Scientific Satellite Program", 13 April 1955, and written by the NRL Rocket Development Branch. Appendix B of this document was labeled, "The Minitrack System" and was nearly identical to its predecessor of a few days. The name "Minitrack" now appearing for the first time on paper, was coined by John Mengel.

== Development ==
The original proposal had only a single pair of stations. However, this was soon realized to be insufficient. From the NASA history:

Before the end of 1955, ideas changed drastically. First, it was realized that a single pair of stations would provide very limited geographical coverage, rendering data acquisition difficult and the accumulation of orbital data very slow. Four pairs of stations across the southern U.S. were next proposed. The idea of a "radio fence" was implicit in this suggestion; i.e., the creation of a long chain of overlapping antenna patterns that the satellite must intersect frequently. The trouble was that the planned orbital inclination of the Vanguard satellite would keep it away from the southern U.S. too much of the time. The next logical step was the construction of a long north-south fence that the satellite would pass through on almost every orbit. But the Vanguard program could not financially support a long chain of paired stations; besides, further thought soon showed that complete orbital data could be computed from angular (interferometric) tracking alone. These changes in thinking manifested themselves in a report describing a chain of nine single Minitrack stations strewn along the 75th meridian. To the regret of some engineers, ranging and velocity-measuring capabilities were dropped.

The technical desirability of Minitrack stations on foreign soil was one thing; more formidable were site negotiation, site preparation, and logistics. The situation was particularly acute in South American countries that were sensitive about U.S. bases and where transportation and communication facilities were primitive. Unfortunately, Minitrack stations required radio-quiet spots which are usually not coexistent with the also-desired communication links and supply facilities. [...]

The Site Selection Team had picked six South American locations: Havana, Panama, Quito, Lima, Antofagasta, and Santiago; but who would undertake the imposing task of setting up stations outside the United States proper? The U.S. Army, by virtue of its IAGS experience, was the logical choice. In September 1956, the Army Chief of Engineers initiated construction at the six sites at the request of NRL. More specifically, the task fell to the specially created Project Vanguard Task Force of the Army Map Service. It should be mentioned here that the South American sites, though near large cities, were generally some distance from modern facilities and their associated radio noise. The isolation and primitive conditions caused logistics and operator morale problems in early days.

The Minitrack sites in the continental U.S. were established with greater ease. The Navy set up and operated the Blossom Point and San Diego stations; the latter being at the Brown Naval Auxiliary Air Station, near Chula Vista, California, and operated by the Naval Electronics Laboratory. The stations downrange from Cape Canaveral were set up in cooperation with Great Britain and operated by the U.S. Navy and Air Force. After deliberation over tracking requirements, logistics, and support facilities, Antigua and Grand Turk were finally chosen for downrange stations instead of the initially planned Barbuda and Mayaguana. [...]

The Blossom Point station, just 56 km southeast of Washington, D.C., went into operation in July 1956, and was soon employed as a training headquarters for Minitrack operators and as a test facility for Minitrack equipment. During the IGY and after, many foreign nationals took the Minitrack course at Blossom Point. In fact, the willingness of NRL and NASA to employ and train foreign nationals at the Minitrack and STADAN stations greatly eased the task of placing U.S. facilities on foreign soil. Minitrack stations have "earned their keep" many times over as non-political, no-strings-attached representatives of the United States.

The full Minitrack network of ten stations was placed in operation during October 1957, with the eleventh, at Woomera, Australia, added a month later. It should already be evident that the Minitrack network was not a static thing. Stations were added and subtracted as the space program required. Bigger satellites with more transmitter power made stations such as Antofagasta redundant. Political harassment in Cuba made it apparent as early as September 1957 that the Havana station would probably have to be moved.

== Technical problems ==
Although a Minitrack station could measure the angles to the satellites very accurately, using this information to determine an orbit required additional work.

- The location of the station must be known very accurately. Prior to satellites, each continent had their own surveying coordinate system, and the relationship between these systems was not known accurately.
- The time at the station must be known accurately. The solution was to set up an accurate clock at each station, and calibrate it by comparing to the radio transmissions of WWV.
- Since more than one observation is needed to determine an accurate orbit, the data from each station must be sent to a central location for orbit determination. This was difficult since the stations were located in radio quiet areas, which therefore had little communications infrastructure. The U.S. army pitched in and built new communications facilities for the stations.

== Minitrack and Sputnik ==
By October 1, 1957, Minitrack was complete except for the checkout of some teletype links and the calibration of some stations. Three days later, Sputnik-1 began crossing the Minitrack fence every 96 minutes; but it was transmitting at 20 and 40 MHz. Minitrack operators knew Sputnik 1 was passing overhead but could not track it with 108-MHz interferometers.

Sputnik 1 was transmitting in the amateur radio bands and getting good publicity as hams all over the world picked up the signals. Army radio engineers and many amateurs spent the night of 4 October 1957 building and modifying their equipment for Doppler tracking. Crude orbital data were available within a day. At NRL, the minitrack team had already begun to modify Minitrack for 40-MHz reception. Alerted by radio announcements of the Sputnik launching, they burned the midnight oil cutting 40-MHz dipoles and planning network modifications. 40-MHz crosses were quickly installed at Blossom Point, San Diego, and Lima; and, later, at Santiago and Woomera. In several days, good tracking data were being received. Sputnik 1 and Sputnik 2, in fact, gave Minitrack good shakedown runs.

== Midlife: 1958-1962 ==
When the U.S. satellites Explorer and Vanguard were launched a few months later, Minitrack was able to track them easily. This worked sufficiently well that the Minitrack interferometers also formed the basic tracking method of the succeeding STADAN network.

The last prime IGY Minitrack station went operational at Woomera during October 1957. Outside of some minor shuffling and addition of sites and the rebuilding of temporary installations, no major changes were made to Minitrack until the big 26-m paraboloidal antenna was installed at the new Fairbanks site in May 1962. [...] During this period, the Minitrack network easily tracked the few, relatively simple scientific satellites that passed overhead. It was a time of intense planning, research, and development as the Nation planned space programs that would soon saturate Minitrack's capabilities.

== Transformation into STADAN ==
As satellites grew bigger and more sophisticated, there were a number of problems that Minitrack could not handle well, and some capabilities that were not needed. These included:

- Satellites in polar orbits. This required new sites to track.
- Satellites in synchronous orbits. These have bearings that change slowly (or can be completely stationary). This makes angle tracking much less useful. What is needed in this case, especially for maneuvers of such satellites, is range and range rate. Minitrack could not make these measurements. A very similar situation exists for satellites that are near apogee in eccentric orbits.
- A need for much larger data return bandwidths, and hence larger antennas. Nimbus was the first satellite that stressed this issue, as it began to return pictures rather than just basic telemetry.
- More, and more automated, telemetry and command facilities, as the number of satellites, and their sophistication, increased.
- Much less need for blind tracking. As the launch ranges improved their tracking, good orbital elements were available before the missile even left the range.

To meet these new needs, a number of fundamental changes were made to the Minitrack network:

- Site changes, closures, and additions.
- Adding larger 12 m (39 ft) and 26 m (85 ft) dishes at some sites.
- Adding the Goddard Range and Range Rate tracking equipment (GRARR).
- Adding new automatic tracking telemetry and command antennas (SATAN).
- Larger and more automated ground communication links between stations.

The resulting early 1960s network was called the Spacecraft Tracking and Data Acquisition Network, or STADAN.

== See also ==
- NASCOM

== Bibliography ==
- William R. Corliss (1974). "NASA Technical report CR 140390, Histories of the Space Tracking and Data Acquisition Network (STADAN), the Manned Space Flight Network (MSFN), and the NASA Communications Network (NASCOM)". NASA. hdl:2060/19750002909.
- Schroeder, C. A.; Looney, C. H. Jr.; Carpenter, H. E. Jr (1957). "Project Vanguard Report #18". Naval Research Laboratory, Washington D.C. Archived from the original on 4 March 2016.
