= Vanguard TV-3 =

U.S. satellite in 1957

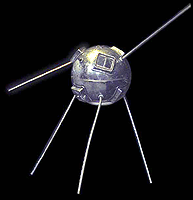
- Vanguard TV-3 spacecraft
- Names: Vanguard Test Vehicle-Three
- Mission type: Earth science
- Operator: U.S. Navy
- Mission duration: Failed to orbit (2 seconds)

Spacecraft properties
- Spacecraft: Vanguard 1A
- Spacecraft type: Vanguard
- Manufacturer: Naval Research Laboratory
- Launch mass: 1.5 kg (3.3 lb)
- Dimensions: 16.3 cm (6½ inches) of diameter

Start of mission
- Launch date: 6 December 1957, 16:44:35 GMT
- Rocket: Vanguard TV-3
- Launch site: Cape Canaveral, LC-18A
- Contractor: Glenn L. Martin Company

End of mission
- Decay date: Failed to orbit

Orbital parameters
- Reference system: Geocentric orbit (planned)
- Regime: Medium Earth orbit
- Perigee altitude: 654 km (406 mi)
- Apogee altitude: 3,969 km (2,466 mi)
- Inclination: 34.2°
- Period: 134.2 minutes

Vanguard TV-3 (also called Vanguard Test Vehicle-Three), was the first attempt of the United States to launch a satellite into orbit around the Earth, after the successful Soviet launches of Sputnik 1 and Sputnik 2. Vanguard TV-3 was a small satellite designed to test the launch capabilities of the three-stage Vanguard and study the effects of the environment on a satellite and its systems in Earth orbit. It was also to be used to obtain geodetic measurements through orbit analysis. Solar cells on Vanguard TV-3 were manufactured by Bell Laboratories.

At its launch attempt on 6 December 1957, at Cape Canaveral Air Force Station, the booster ignited and began to rise, but about two seconds after liftoff, after rising about 1.2 m (four feet), the rocket lost thrust and fell back to the launch pad. As it settled, the fuel tanks ruptured and exploded, destroying the rocket and severely damaging the launch pad. The Vanguard 1A satellite was thrown clear and landed on the ground a short distance away with its transmitters still sending out a beacon signal. The satellite was damaged, however, and could not be reused. It is now on display at the National Air and Space Museum of the Smithsonian Institution.

The exact cause of the accident was not determined with certainty, but it appeared that the fuel system malfunctioned. Other engines of the same model were modified and did not fail.

== Satellite construction project ==
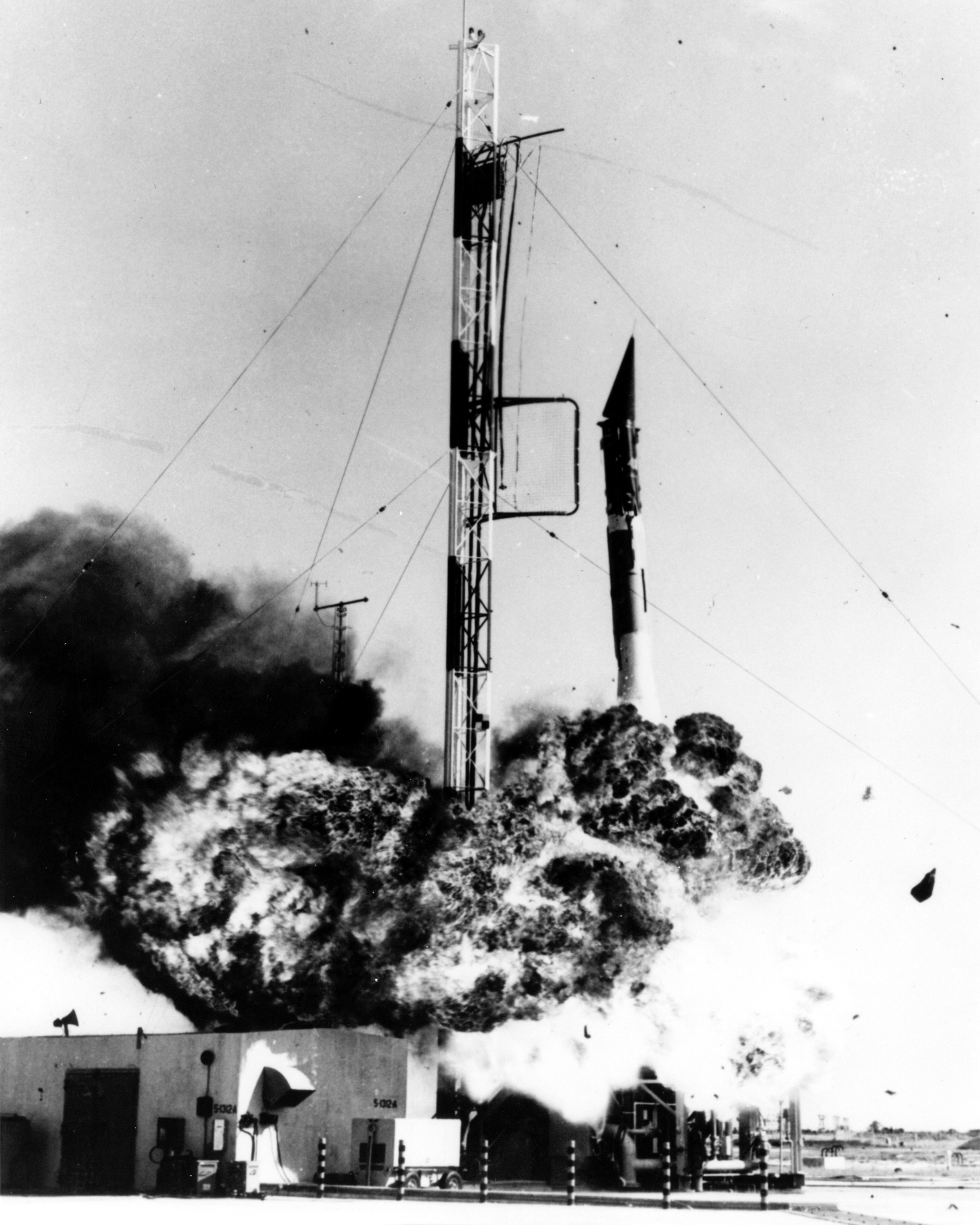
The Vanguard rocket explodes on launch

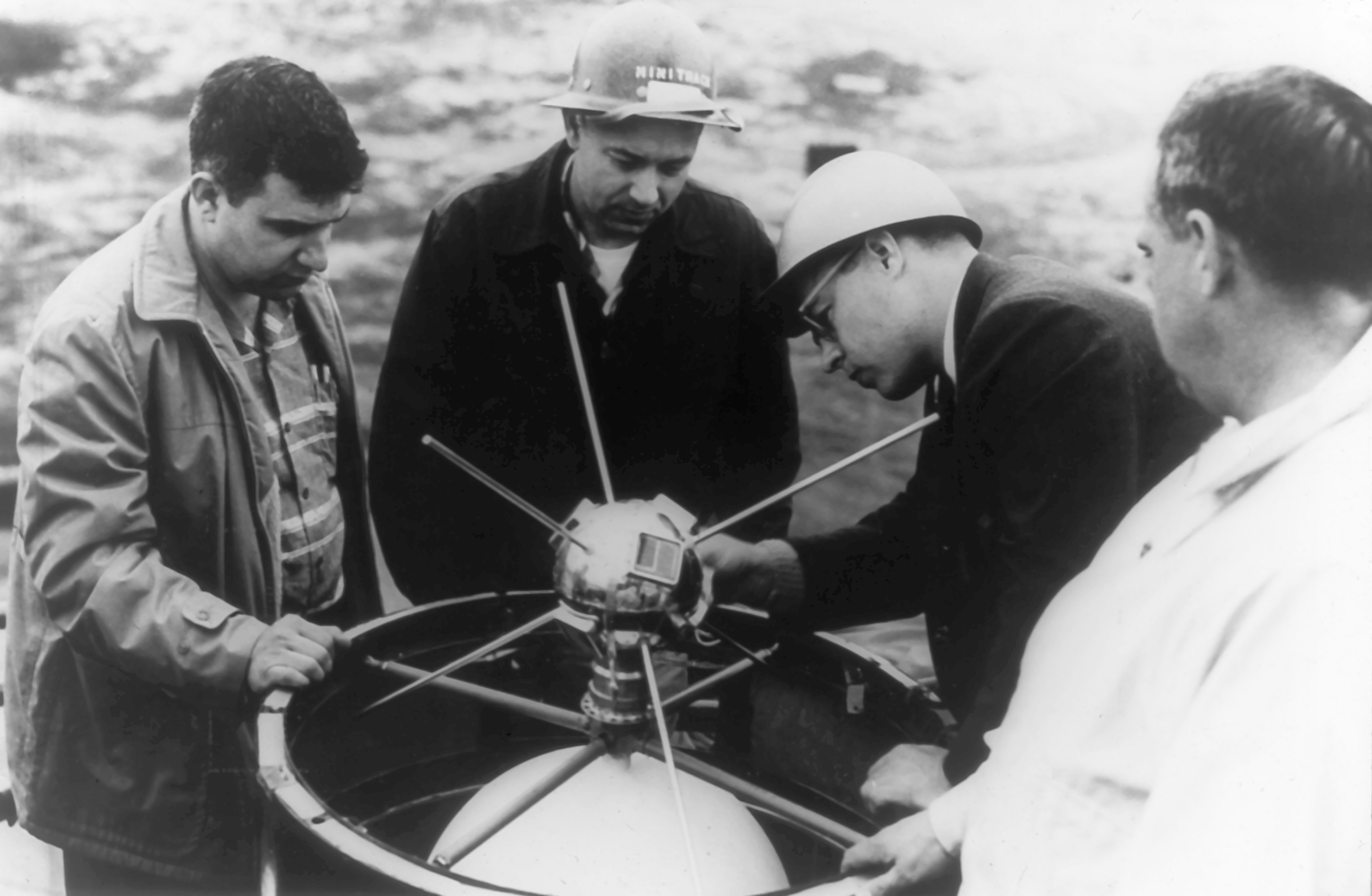
The NRL engineers place Vanguard 1 atop the third stage of the launching vehicle. Shown here (from left to right, Roger L. Easton, Sandy J. Smith, Robert C. Bauman, and Joseph B. Schwartz. (Bauman and Schwartz transferred with the Vanguard Project to NASA). On 17 March 1958, Vanguard 1 started its historic journey into space (U.S. Navy photo).

The history of the Vanguard TV-3 project dates back to the International Geophysical Year (IGY). This was an enthusiastic international undertaking that united scientists globally to conduct planet-wide geophysical studies. The IGY guaranteed free exchange of information acquired through scientific observation which led to many important discoveries in the future. Orbiting a satellite became one of the main goals of the IGY. As early as July 1955, President Dwight D. Eisenhower announced, through his press secretary, that the United States would launch "small, unmanned, Earth-circling satellites as part of the U.S. participation in the I.G.Y." On 9 September 1955, the United States Department of Defense (U.S. DoD) wrote a letter to the secretary of the Navy authorizing the mission to proceed. The U.S. Navy had been assigned the task of launching Vanguard satellites as part of the program. Project Vanguard had officially begun.

== Spacecraft ==
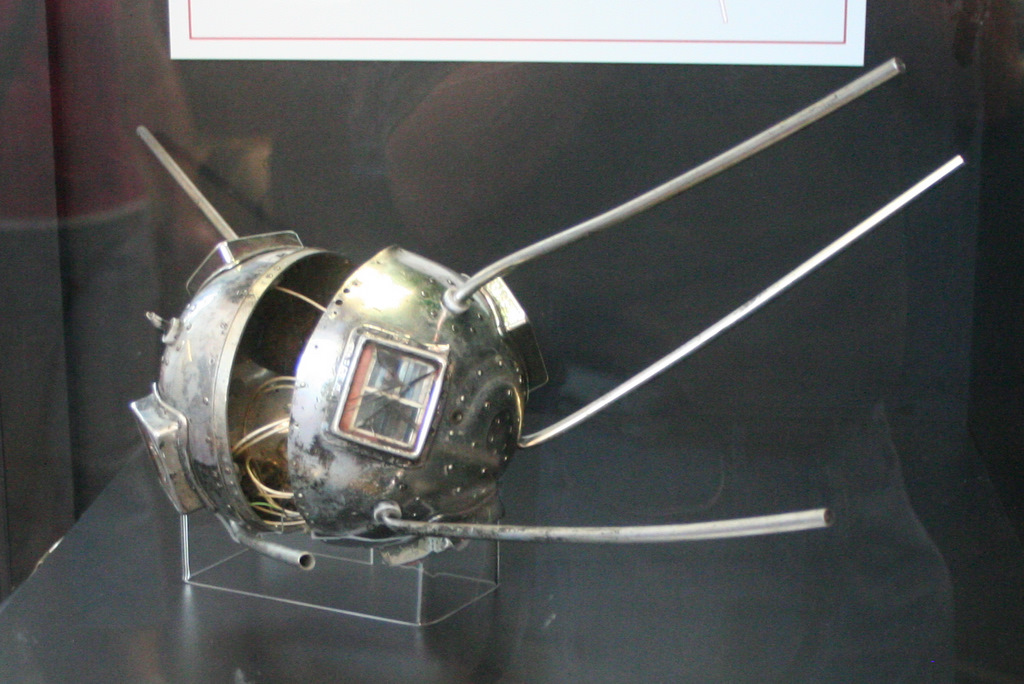
The Vanguard 1A satellite on display at the National Air and Space Museum, 2009.

The payload of the TV-3 was very similar to the later Vanguard 1. It was a small aluminium sphere, 16.3 cm (6.4 in) in diameter and with a mass of 1.5 kg (3.3 lb). It carried two transmitters: a 10-mW, 108-MHz transmitter powered by a mercury battery, and a 5-mW, 108.03-MHz transmitter powered by six solar cells mounted on the body of the spacecraft. Using six small aerial antennae mounted on its body, the satellite primarily transmitted engineering and telemetry data, but the transmitters were also used to determine the total electron content between the satellite and the ground stations. Other instruments in the satellite's design included two thermistors, which were used to measure the satellite's internal temperatures for the purpose of tracking its thermal protection's effectiveness. Although the satellite was damaged beyond reuse capability during the crash, it was still transmitting after the incident.

== Launch vehicle ==
Vanguard TV-3 utilized the three-stage Vanguard designed to send the satellite into orbit around the Earth. The fins were removed from the rocket as a way to reduce the drag and instead, the launch motor was mounted in gimbals which allowed it to pivot and direct its thrust for steering. The second and third stages of the rocket were also gimballed.

== Launch ==
At launch on 6 December 1957 at 16:44:35 GMT at the Atlantic Missile Range in Cape Canaveral, Florida, the booster ignited and began to rise but about 2 seconds after liftoff, after rising about a meter (3 feet), the rocket lost thrust and began to settle back down to the launch pad. As it settled against the launch pad the fuel tanks ruptured and exploded, destroying the rocket and severely damaging the launch pad. The Vanguard satellite was thrown clear and landed on the ground a short distance away with its transmitters still sending out a beacon signal. The satellite was damaged, however, and could not be reused. It is now on display at the Smithsonian Air and Space Museum.

== Cause of failure ==
The exact cause of the accident was not determined with certainty due to limited telemetry instrumentation at this early phase, but The Martin Company concluded that low fuel tank pressure during the start procedure allowed some of the burning fuel in the combustion chamber to leak into the fuel system through the injector head before full propellant pressure was obtained from the turbopump. General Electric, on the other hand, argued that the problem was a loose fuel connection. In hindsight, the first problem appeared to cause the second. The investigation concluded that tank and fuel system pressure were slightly lower than nominal, which resulted in insufficient pressure in the injector head. As a result, hot combustion gas backed up into the injector head and caused a large pressure spike. The injector rings completely burned through, followed by the rupture of the combustion chamber. At T+1 second, a shock wave in the thrust section of the booster ruptured a fuel feed line, completely terminating engine thrust. GE technicians had failed to catch this design flaw during testing and a temporary fix was made by increasing tank pressure. Eventually, a further modification was made by using ethane gas to increase fuel force and prevent rough start transients. The X-405 engine did not fail again on subsequent launches and static firing tests.

== Reaction ==
After the launch failure, trading in the stock of the Martin Company, the prime contractor for the project, was temporarily suspended by the New York Stock Exchange.

Newspapers in the United States published prominent headlines and articles describing the failure with plays on the name of the Russian satellite, Sputnik, such as "Flopnik", "Kaputnik", "Oopsnik", "Dudnick" and "Stayputnik". The failure, reported in international media, was a humiliating loss of prestige for the United States, which had presented itself to the world as the leader in science and technology. The Soviet Union, the United States' rival in the Cold War, exploited the disaster. A few days after the incident, a Soviet delegate to the United Nations inquired whether the United States was interested in receiving aid earmarked for "undeveloped countries".

The TV-3 disaster was quoted by the New York Times as a "Blow to US Prestige". Senator Lyndon B. Johnson had said that the launch was "most humiliating" for the American people. In the words of Donald J. Markarian, the project engineer of the Martin Company, the company in charge of the development and creation of TV-3, "Following the TV-3 explosion, Project Vanguard became the whipping boy for the hurt pride of the American people."

The concurrent project Explorer 1 proved successful a few weeks later, on 1 February 1958.
