= Eilene Galloway =

American space law researcher (1906–2009)

Eilene Marie Galloway (née Slack) (May 4, 1906 – May 2, 2009) was an American space law researcher and editor, who advised politicians during the Sputnik crisis and assisted with the founding of NASA.

== Biography ==
Galloway was born Eilene Marie Slack in Kansas City, Missouri, the only child of Joseph Locke Slack, a railroad worker from a prominent family in Monroe, Louisiana,and Lottie Rose (Harris), who was born in Texas of a pioneer family. In 1915, her father left the family household to join the marines, leaving her to be raised solely by her mother. She graduated from Westport High School in 1923 (where she captained the debate team twice) and then attended Washington University in St. Louis on a scholarship from 1923 to 1925. On December 24, 1924, she married George Barnes Galloway, then an MA political science student at Washington. In 1925 she gave up her college scholarship to live in Washington DC with George, where he was completing his PhD at the Robert Brookings Graduate School in Government and Economics, which later became the Brookings Institution. After completing his degree, George then obtained a job at the bureau of municipal research in Philadelphia, Pennsylvania, and the couple moved to the nearby community of Swarthmore so that Galloway could resume her studies at Swarthmore College, where she was voted in to the college's honors program, which had recently been introduced by its president Frank Aydelotte. She graduated from Swarthmore with a degree in political science with High Honors in 1928. She was a member of Phi Beta Kappa and Kappa Alpha Theta.

After graduating from Swarthmore, Galloway taught political science there for two years. In 1931, she moved back with her husband and two sons to Washington DC, where she became an assistant to Aubrey Willis Williams, the Assistant Federal Relief Administrator during the New Deal. She oversaw adult education programs both nationwide and in her local area and compiled a guide to adult education; 175,000 copies of it were distributed by The Washington Post.

She began her work with the Congressional Research Service in the Library of Congress in September 1941, editing what later became Public Affairs Abstracts. She became National Defense Analyst, wrriting the reports Atomic Energy: Issues Before Congress in 1946 and Guided Missiles in Foreign Countries in early 1957. Later that year her work began encompassing space law during the Sputnik Crisis, when she was asked by Senator Richard Russel Jr to write a report on the impact of the Soviet Union being the first to send a satellite into orbit. Russel then introduced Galloway to Lyndon B. Johnson, who then asked Galloway to assist in the summarization of Congressional testimonies regarding Sputnik. At the behest of John W. McCormack, the Majority Leader of the House of Representatives, Galloway provided advice on the creation of the Select Committee on Astronautics and Space Exploration, which McCormack subsequently chaired. Its recommendations included the establishment of a national space agency. McCormack again asked Galloway for advice on the recommendations, and she proposed that it be an administration rather than an agency so it could have broader authority to coordinate with many other government agencies. McCormack accepted this recommendation, leading to the creation of NASA. She retired from the Library of Congress in 1975 but continued there as a consultant until 2006.

Galloway worked for several decades on the United Nations Committee on the Peaceful Uses of Outer Space and was a founding member of the International Institute of Space Law (IISL). She served on NASA advisory committees and published numerous articles.

Her husband George became an expert in the workings of congress and a colleague at the Congressional Research Service; their marriage lasted until his death in 1967. They had two sons, David Barnes Galloway, a journalist for the Orange County edition of The Los Angeles Times who died in 1993, and Jonathan Fuller Galloway, a retired professor of political science at Lake Forest College.

Eilene Galloway died of breast cancer in her Washington, D.C. home on May 2, 2009, aged 102.

== Recognition ==
In 1984 Galloway was the recipient of the NASA Public Service Award and Gold Medal and in 1987 she became the first person to receive a Lifetime Achievement Award from Women in Aerospace. She became a fellow of the American Astronautical Society in 1996, received the National Aeronautic Association's Katharine Wright Award in 2003, and in 2006 was the first woman elected an Honorary Fellow of the American Institute of Aeronautics and Astronautics. She received honorary doctorates from Swarthmore College in 1992 and Lake Forest College in 1990. Described by friends and colleagues as the "Grand dame of space", in 2006, for her hundredth birthday, the US Congress paid tribute to her, with Bart Gordon, chairman of the House Committee on Science and Technology, describing her as an influential force in the development and analysis of domestic and international space law and policy". The annual international Galloway Symposium on Critical Issues in Space Law is named in her honour. Her papers are at the National Air and Space Museum.
