= Creation of NASA =

Short documentary on the origins of NASA

The National Aeronautics and Space Administration (NASA) was created in 1958 from the National Advisory Committee for Aeronautics (NACA), and other related organizations, as the result of the Space Race between the United States and the Soviet Union in the 1950s.

== Background ==
From 1946, the National Advisory Committee for Aeronautics (NACA) had been experimenting with rocket planes, such as the supersonic Bell X-1. In the early 1950s, there was a challenge to launch an artificial satellite for the International Geophysical Year (1957–58). An effort for this was the American Project Vanguard. After the Soviet space program launched the world's first artificial satellite (Sputnik 1) on October 4, 1957, the United States stepped up its own efforts. The U.S. Congress, alarmed by the perceived threat to national security and technological leadership known as the "Sputnik crisis", urged immediate action, while President Eisenhower and his advisers counseled more deliberate measures. This led to an agreement that a new federal agency based upon NACA was needed to conduct all non-military activity in space. The Advanced Research Projects Agency was also created at this time to develop space technology for military application.

== Transition from NACA to NASA ==
From late 1957 to early 1958, the already existing National Advisory Committee for Aeronautics (NACA) began studying what a new non-military space agency would entail, as well as what its role might be, and assigned several committees to review the concept. On January 12, 1958, NACA organized a "Special Committee on Space Technology", headed by Guyford Stever. Stever's committee included consultation from the Army Ballistic Missile Agency's large booster program, referred to as the Working Group on Vehicular Programs. This group was headed by Wernher von Braun, a German scientist who during World War II had developed ballistic missiles such as the V-2 rocket for Nazi Germany before being brought to the US in Operation Paperclip.

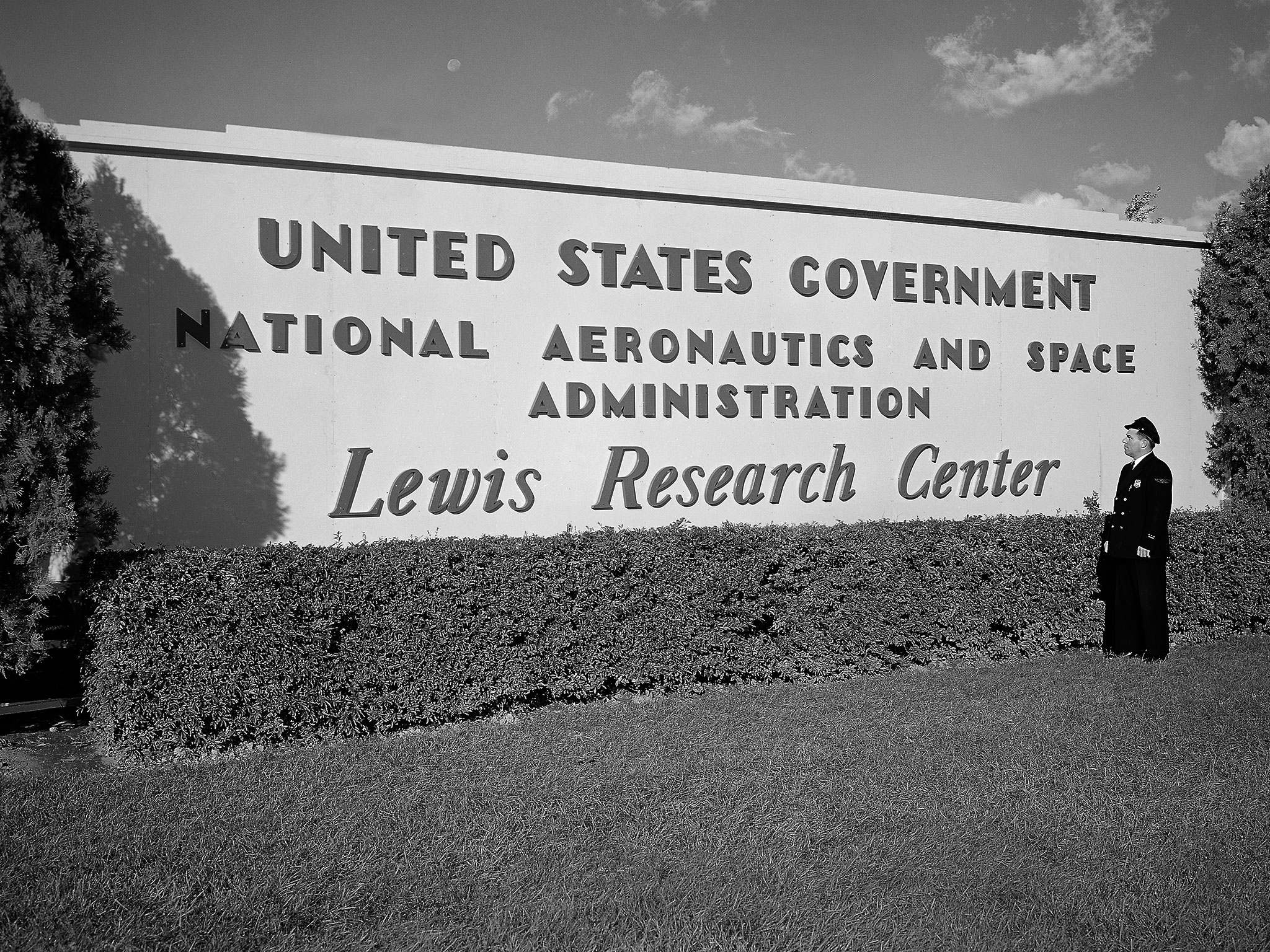
A security guard examines the new sign near the entrance to the Lewis Research Center one day after the National Aeronautics and Space Administration (NASA) was officially established. NASA came into being on October 1, 1958, and the National Advisory Committee for Aeronautics (NACA) Lewis Flight Propulsion Laboratory became the NASA Lewis Research Center.

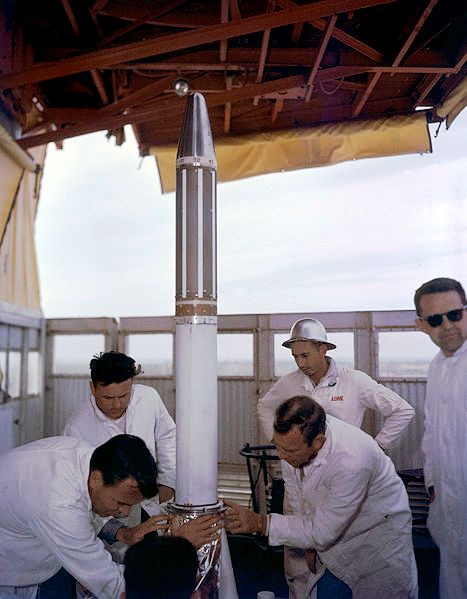
Explorer 1 installed in 1958

On January 14, 1958, NACA Director Hugh Dryden published "A National Research Program for Space Technology" stating:

It is of great urgency and importance to our country both from consideration of our prestige as a nation as well as military necessity that this challenge [Sputnik] be met by an energetic program of research and development for the conquest of space... It is accordingly proposed that the scientific research be the responsibility of a national civilian agency... NACA is capable, by rapid extension and expansion of its effort, of providing leadership in space technology.

Launched on January 31, 1958, Explorer 1, officially Satellite 1958 Alpha, became the U.S.'s first Earth satellite. The Explorer 1 payload consisted of the Iowa Cosmic Ray Instrument without a tape data recorder which was not modified in time to make it onto the satellite.

On March 5, President's Science Advisory Committee (PSAC) Chairman James Killian wrote a memorandum to President Dwight D. Eisenhower, entitled "Organization for Civil Space Programs", encouraging the creation of a civil space program based upon a "strengthened and redesignated" NACA which could expand its research program "with a minimum of delay." In late March, a NACA report entitled "Suggestions for a Space Program" included recommendations for subsequently developing a hydrogen fluorine fueled rocket of 4,450,000 newtons (1,000,000 lb_{f}) thrust designed with second and third stages.

In April 1958, Eisenhower delivered to the U.S. Congress an executive address favoring a national civilian space agency and submitted a bill to create a "National Aeronautical and Space Agency." NACA's former role of research alone would change to include large-scale development, management, and operations. The U.S. Congress passed the bill, somewhat reworded, as the National Aeronautics and Space Act of 1958, on July 16. Only two days later von Braun's Working Group submitted a preliminary report severely criticizing the duplication of efforts and lack of coordination among various organizations assigned to the United States' space programs. Stever's Committee on Space Technology concurred with the criticisms of the von Braun Group (a final draft was published several months later, in October).

On July 29, 1958, Eisenhower signed the National Aeronautics and Space Act, establishing NASA. When it began operations on October 1, 1958, NASA absorbed the 46-year-old NACA intact; its 8,000 employees, an annual budget of US$100 million, three major research laboratories (Langley Aeronautical Laboratory, Ames Aeronautical Laboratory, and Lewis Flight Propulsion Laboratory) and two small test facilities.

Elements of the Army Ballistic Missile Agency, of which von Braun's team was a part, and the Naval Research Laboratory were incorporated into NASA. A significant contributor to NASA's entry into the Space Race with the Soviet Union was the technology from the German rocket program (led by von Braun) which in turn incorporated the technology of Robert Goddard's earlier works. Earlier research efforts within the U.S. Air Force and many of ARPA's early space programs were also transferred to NASA. In December 1958, NASA gained control of the Jet Propulsion Laboratory, a contractor facility operated by the California Institute of Technology.

== See also ==
- Select Committee on Astronautics and Space Exploration
- Eilene Galloway
