= Vanguard 3 =

American research satellite launched in 1959

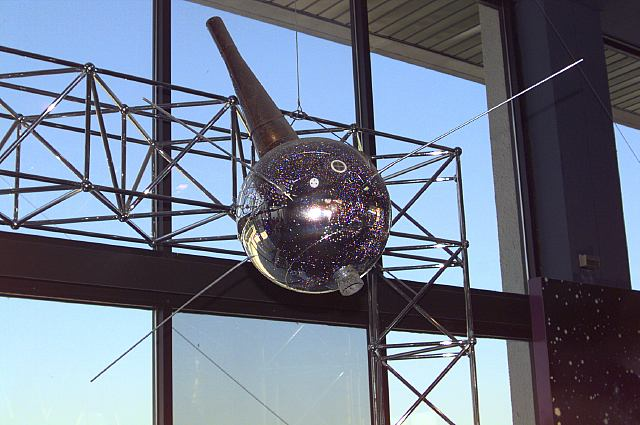
- Vanguard 3 satellite
- Names: Vanguard Space Launch Vehicle-7; Vanguard-TV4BU
- Mission type: Earth science
- Operator: Naval Research Laboratory
- Harvard designation: 1959 Eta 1
- COSPAR ID: 1959-007A
- SATCAT no.: 00020
- Mission duration: 90 days (planned); 66 years, 4 months and 14 days (in orbit)

Spacecraft properties
- Spacecraft: Vanguard 3C
- Spacecraft type: Vanguard
- Manufacturer: Naval Research Laboratory
- Launch mass: 42.9 kg (95 lb)
- Dimensions: 50.8 cm (20.0 in) diameter

Start of mission
- Launch date: 18 September 1959, 05:20:07 GMT
- Rocket: Vanguard/Altair
- Launch site: Cape Canaveral, LC-18A
- Contractor: Glenn L. Martin Company

End of mission
- Last contact: 11 December 1959
- Decay date: 2259 (estimated); ~ 300 years orbital lifetime

Orbital parameters
- Reference system: Geocentric orbit
- Regime: Medium Earth orbit
- Perigee altitude: 512 km (318 mi)
- Apogee altitude: 3,750 km (2,330 mi)
- Inclination: 33.35°
- Period: 130.0 minutes

Instruments
- Proton Precessional Magnetometer; Micrometeorite Detectors; Satellite Drag Atmospheric Density; X-Ray Experiment

Vanguard 3 (Harvard designation: 1959 Eta 1) is a scientific satellite that was launched into Earth orbit by the Vanguard SLV-7 on 18 September 1959, the third successful Vanguard launch out of eleven attempts. Vanguard rocket: Vanguard Satellite Launch Vehicle-7 (SLV-7) was an unused Vanguard TV-4BU (TV-4BU=Test Vehicle-Four BackUp) rocket, updated to the final production Satellite Launch Vehicle (SLV).

Project Vanguard was a program managed by the United States Naval Research Laboratory (NRL), and designed and built by the Glenn L. Martin Company (now Lockheed Martin), which intended to launch the first artificial satellite into Earth orbit using a Vanguard rocket. as the launch vehicle from Cape Canaveral, Florida. Vanguard 3 was an important part of the Space Race between the U.S. and the Soviet Union.

== Previous satellites ==
Before the 18 September 1959 successful launch of the satellite that became known as Vanguard 3, two other satellites that bore the name "Vanguard 3" were launched, but both launches ended in failures and the satellites did not reach orbit. The failed satellites were:

- Vanguard 3A, launched 13 April 1959 on a Vanguard SLV-5 rocket,
- Vanguard 3B, launched 22 June 1959 on a Vanguard SLV-6 rocket.

The successful satellite that became known as the Vanguard 3 was known as Vanguard 3C before launch.

== Spacecraft ==
The Vanguard 3 satellite is a 50.8 cm (20.0 in) diameter sphere with a 66 cm (26 in) conical boom on top. The lower three-fourths of the sphere was silicon monoxide-coated magnesium and the upper fourth and the conical extension were made of fiberglass (glass fiber phenolic resin). Mass of the satellite was approximately 23.7 kg (52 lb), the total mass of the orbiting spacecraft with the 19.2 kg (42 lb) third stage casing attached was 42.9 kg (95 lb).

Power was provided by specially built Yardley Silvercels (AgZn chemical batteries) with non-magnetic lugs, designed to last approximately 3 months. The batteries were held in a pressurized can mounted in the lower two-thirds of the sphere. In its top center, the can also contained a smaller cylinder, which held the electronics for the X-ray, peak memory, temperature measurements, micrometeorite detector, and data encoder, above which was the 30 mW, 108.00 MHz Minitrack beacon transmitter. Another cylinder, mounted on top of the pressurized compartment, held the magnetometer instrumentation package, associated electronics, the command receiver and 80 mW, 108.03 MHz transmitter plus electronics providing burst telemetry for the magnetometer. A tape recorder was used to store data for playback during ground station passes. Four spring loaded aerials extended from the equator of the sphere at 90° intervals. A small solar cell and cadmium sulfide cell were also mounted on the sphere wall near the equator. The magnetometer sensor head was mounted at the end of the conical boom. The sphere was spin-stabilized and had passive thermal control. It had no engines for thrust or attitude control.

== Launch ==
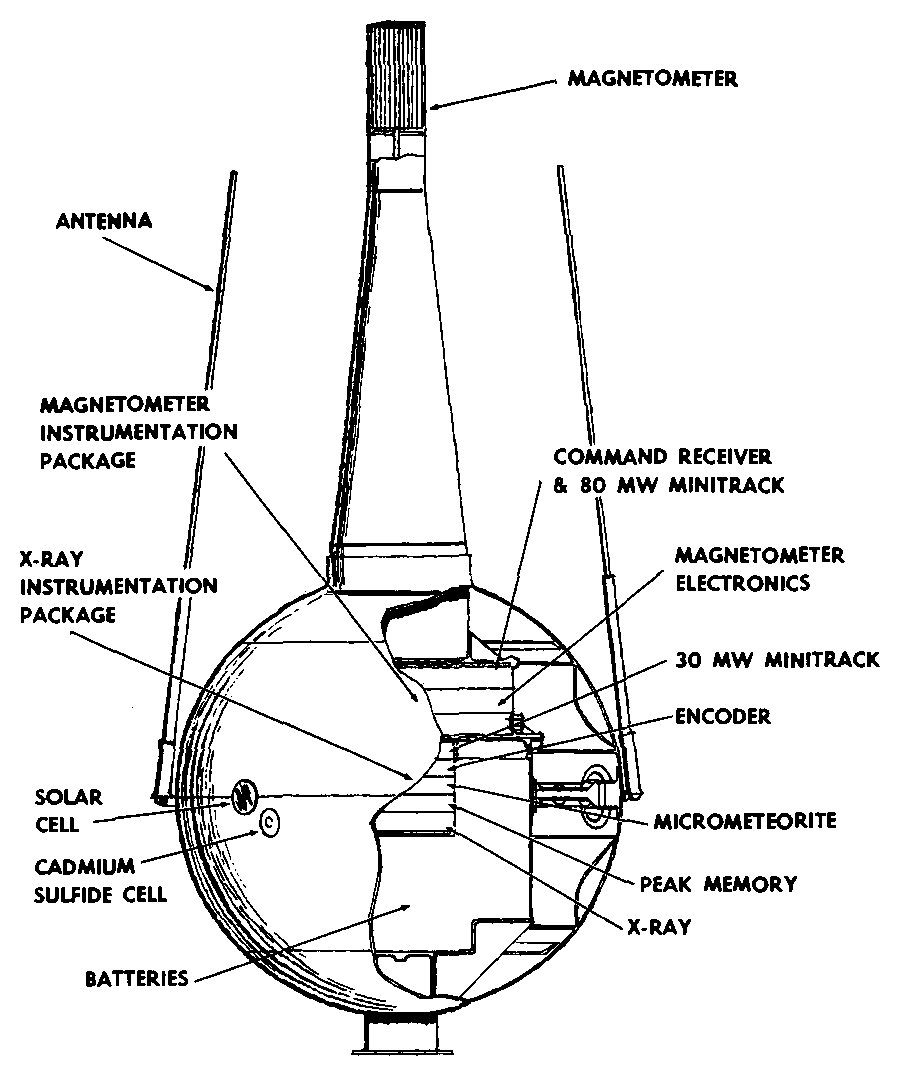
Vanguard 3 satellite sketch

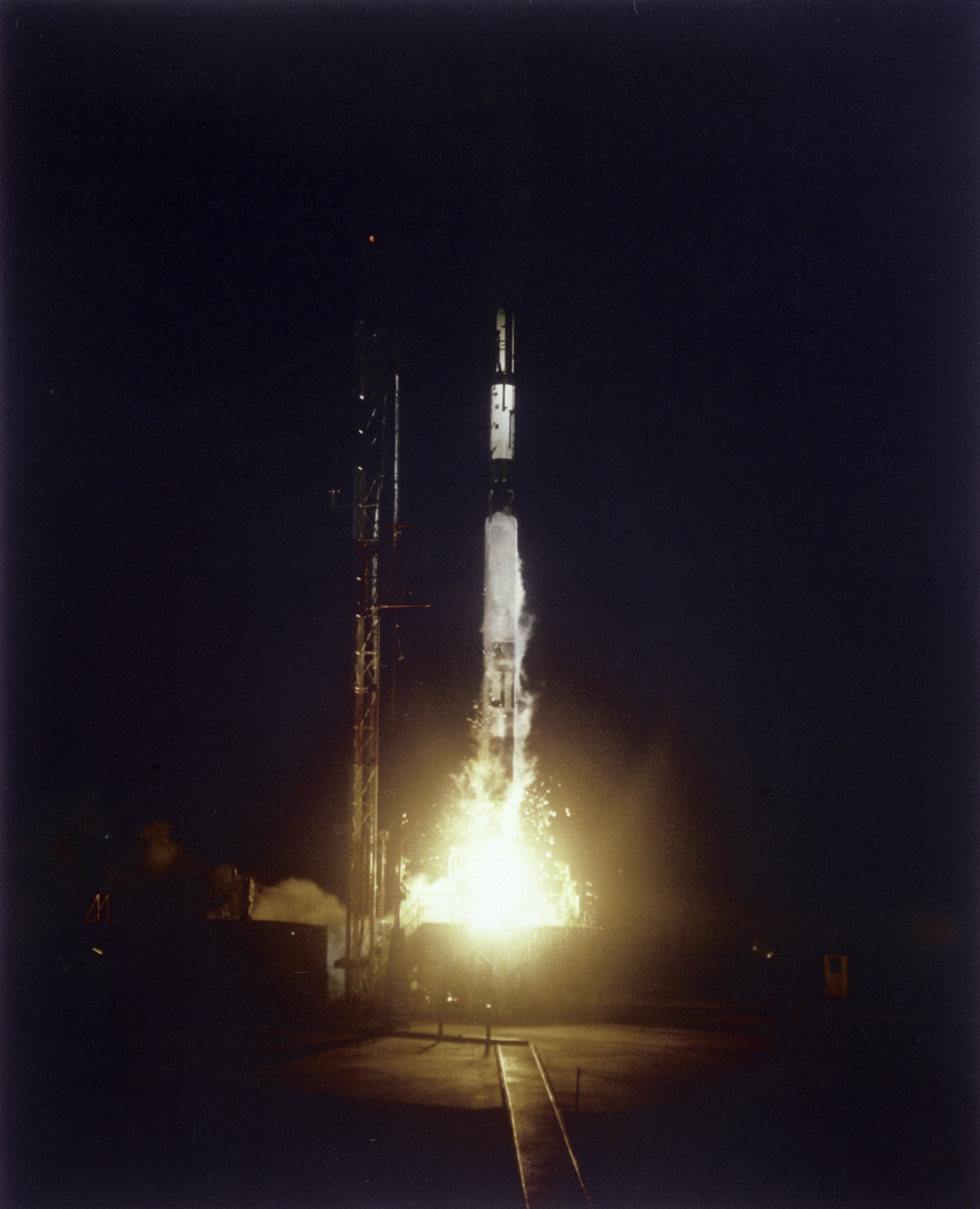
Launch of Vanguard 3 on Vanguard SLV-7 rocket

Vanguard 3 was launched at 05:20:07 GMT (12:20:07 a.m. EST) on 18 September 1959 from the Eastern Test Range of the Atlantic Missile Range at Cape Canaveral into a geocentric orbit. The satellite was then injected at 05:29:49 GMT into a 33.35° inclination Earth orbit with a perigee altitude of 512 km (318 mi), apogee of 3,750 km (2,330 mi), and an orbital period of 130.0 minutes. The third stage was purposely left attached to the satellite, in order to produce a long tumble period, to avoid corrections to the magnetometer that would be necessary with a rapidly rotating satellite. Perigee remained on the night side of Earth throughout the mission. All experiments functioned normally and the batteries lasted for 84 days, until 11 December 1959, at which time all communication with the spacecraft ceased. It was still tracked optically with telescopes for the atmospheric drag experiment.

== Mission objectives ==
The objectives of the flight were to measure the Earth's magnetic field, the solar X-ray radiation and its effects on the atmosphere of Earth, and the near-Earth micrometeoroid environment. Instrumentation included a proton magnetometer, X-ray ionization chambers, and various micrometeoroid detectors. The spacecraft was a 50.8 cm (20.0 in) of diameter magnesium sphere. The magnetometer was housed in a fiberglass/phenolic resin conical tube attached to the sphere. The data obtained provided a comprehensive survey of the Earth's magnetic field over the area covered, defined the lower edge of the Van Allen radiation belt, and provided a count of micrometeoroid impacts.

== Mission results ==
=== Proton Precessional Magnetometer ===
This experiment had a proton precessional magnetometer to measure the Earth's magnetic field at altitudes ranging from 514 km (319 mi) to 3,714 km (2,308 mi) and at latitudes between ± 33.4°. The measurements were made on command as the spacecraft passed seven Minitrack stations in North and South America and one each in Australia and South Africa. When switched on by command, the polarization coil around the proton sample (normal hexane) was turned on for 2 seconds followed by a 2 seconds readout of the precession signal. Several readings were taken during each pass over a station. The experiment worked well during its 84 days active life, and approximately 4300 readings were recorded. The experiment is described in J. C. Cain et al., "Measurements of the geomagnetic field by the Vanguard 3 satellite", NASA TN D-1418, Goddard Space Flight Center, Greenbelt, Maryland, 1962, The overall accuracy of the field measurements was approximately 10 nT (gammas).

=== X-Ray Experiment ===
The objective of this experiment was to measure the X-ray emission from the Sun and its effects on the Atmosphere of Earth. The detectors were two identical ionization chambers sensitive to X-ray wavelengths produced in solar flares (2 to 8 Å, or 200 to 800 pm). The ionization chambers were located 120° apart in the equatorial plane of the satellite and received a maximum signal when an ion chamber tube "looked" toward the Sun. The instrumentation were designed to measure the 2 to 8 Å (200 to 800 pm) X-ray flux and record the peak solar flare intensity by means of a peak-reading memory device, during the daylight portion of each orbit. However, due to the overwhelming background radiation of the Van Allen Belts, its sensors were saturated, and no useful information on solar X-rays was gathered.

=== Micrometeorite Detector ===
This experiment contained two sealed pressure zones, extending along the interior walls of the satellite, which were designed to record the impact of micrometeorites large enough to pierce the satellite shell. These pressure zones were partial vacuums, each at a different pressure, and were protected by 0.66 mm magnesium walls that presented an exposed surface area of 0.162 m^{2}, which was 20% of the area of the shell. A puncture in the walls of either zone was detected by a differential pressure gauge mounted between them, and telemetered as a change in the length of one of the telemetry channels. Erosion of the satellite shell through bombardment by space dust, micrometeorites, and other particles was recorded by three chromium-strip erosion gauges mounted on the satellite surface, and by a photosensitive detector. Electrical resistances of the gauges changed as their surfaces were changed by erosion. The photosensitive detector, a cadmium sulfide cell protected by an opaque covering of aluminized PET film, also showed a resistance change as the covering was eroded or penetrated. Erosion measurements also were telemetered as channel lengths, which permitted estimates of the erosion rates. Four barium titanate-type microphones recorded micrometeorite impacts on the satellite's surface. The microphone output was amplified, shaped, and fed into a magnetic counter unit, which provided continuously, in three-decimal digits, the cumulative count of impacts. The unit counted up to 1000 and then reset to zero. The satellite recorded 6600 micrometeorite impacts during 66 days of operation, of which 2800 occurred during a 70 hours interval from 16 to 18 November 1959, almost certainly due to the Earth's annual passage through debris from comet Tempel-Tuttle, which results in the Leonids meteor shower which peaks on the 17 November 1959. No penetrations or fractures were recorded in the sensors of the surface penetration experiment. Because the erosion sensors were not disrupted, no definite results could be drawn from that experiment.

=== Satellite Drag Atmospheric Density ===
Because of its symmetrical shape, Vanguard 3 was selected by the experimenters for use in determining upper atmospheric densities as a function of altitude, latitude, season, and solar activity. As the spacecraft continuously orbited, it would lag its predicted positions slightly, accumulating greater and greater delay due to drag of the residual atmosphere. By measuring the rate and timing of orbital shifts, the relevant atmosphere's parameters could be back-calculated knowing the body's drag properties. It was determined that atmospheric pressures, and thus drag and orbital decay, were higher than anticipated, as Earth's upper atmosphere tapered into space gradually.

This experiment was very much planned prior to launch. Initial Naval Research Laboratory proposals for Project Vanguard included conical satellite bodies; this eliminated the need for a separate fairing and ejection mechanisms, and their associated weight and failure modes. Radio tracking would gather data and establish a position. Early in the program, optical tracking (with a Baker-Nunn camera network and human spotters) was added. A panel of scientists proposed changing the design to spheres, at least 50.8 cm (20.0 in) in diameter and hopefully 76.2 cm (30.0 in). A sphere would have a constant optical reflection, and constant coefficient of drag, based on size alone, while a cone would vary with orientation. James Van Allen proposed a cylinder, which eventually flew (Explorer 1). The Project Vanguard finally accepted 16 cm (6.3 in) and 50.8 cm satellites.

== Post mission ==
After the scientific mission ended with data transmission ceasing on 11 December 1959, after 84 days of operation, Vanguard 3 and two pieces of the upper stage of the rocket used to launch the satellite became derelict objects. Vanguard 3 remains in orbit. The pieces of the upper stage re-entered the atmosphere on 3 April 2014 and 4 February 2015. As Vanguard 1, Vanguard 2, and Vanguard 3 are still orbiting with their drag properties essentially unchanged, they form a baseline data set on the atmosphere of Earth that is over 60 years old and continuing. Vanguard 3 has an expected lifetime of 300 years.
