= Project Vanguard =

U.S. Navy satellite program in the 1950s

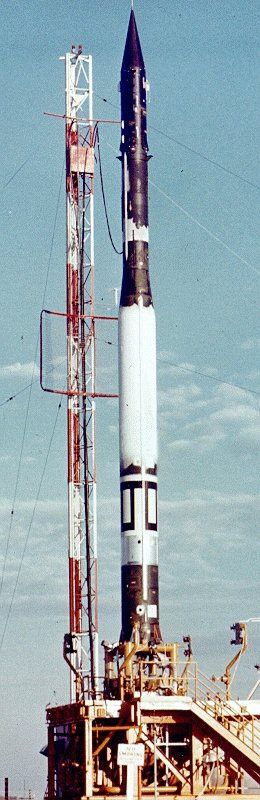
Vanguard rocket on Pad LC-18A

Project Vanguard was a program managed by the United States Navy's Naval Research Laboratory (NRL), which intended to launch the first artificial satellite into low Earth orbit using a Vanguard rocket as the launch vehicle from Cape Canaveral Missile Annex, Florida.

In response to the launch of Sputnik 1 on 4 October 1957, the U.S. restarted the Explorer program, which had been proposed earlier by the Army Ballistic Missile Agency (ABMA). Privately, however, the Central Intelligence Agency (CIA) and President Dwight D. Eisenhower were aware of progress being made by the Soviets on Sputnik from secret spy plane imagery. Together with the Jet Propulsion Laboratory (JPL), ABMA built Explorer 1 and launched it on 1 February 1958 (UTC). Before work was completed, however, the Soviet Union launched a second satellite, Sputnik 2, on 3 November 1957. Meanwhile, the spectacular failure of Vanguard TV3 on 6 December 1957, deepened American dismay over the country's position in the Space Race.

On 17 March 1958, Vanguard 1 became the second artificial satellite successfully placed in a low Earth orbit by the United States. It was the first solar-powered satellite. Just 15.2 cm (6.0 in) in diameter and weighing 1.4 kg (3.1 lb), Vanguard 1 was described by then-Soviet Premier Nikita Khrushchev as, "The grapefruit satellite". Vanguard 1, and the upper stage of its launch vehicle, are the oldest artificial satellites still in space, as Vanguard's predecessors, Sputnik 1, Sputnik 2, and Explorer 1, have decayed from orbit.

== Project history ==
In the early 1950s, the American Rocket Society set up an ad hoc Committee on Space Flight, of which Milton W. Rosen, NRL project manager for the Viking rocket, became chair. Encouraged by conversations between Richard W. Porter of General Electric and Alan T. Waterman, Director of the National Science Foundation (NSF), Rosen on 27 November 1954, completed a report describing the potential value of launching an Earth satellite. The report was submitted to the NSF early in 1955. As part of planning for the International Geophysical Year (1957–1958), the U.S. publicly undertook to place an artificial satellite with a scientific experiment into orbit around the Earth.

=== The three services' proposals ===
Proposals to do this were presented by the United States Air Force (USAF), the United States Army (USA), and the United States Navy (USN). The Army Ballistic Missile Agency (ABMA) under Dr. Wernher von Braun had suggested using a modified Redstone rocket (see: Juno I) while the Air Force had proposed using the Atlas launch vehicle, which did not yet exist. The Navy proposed designing a rocket system based on the Viking and Aerobee rocket systems.

The Air Force proposal was not seriously considered, as Atlas development was years behind the other vehicles. Among other limitations, the Army submission focused on the launch vehicle, while a payload was assumed to become available from the Jet Propulsion Laboratory (JPL), and the network of ground tracking stations was assumed to be a Navy project. The Navy proposal detailed all three aspects of the mission.

== The Navy's project ==
In August 1955, the US DoD Committee on Special Capabilities chose the Navy's proposal as it appeared most likely, by spring 1958, to fulfill the following:

1. Place a satellite in orbit during the International Geophysical Year.
2. Accomplish a scientific experiment in orbit.
3. Track the satellite and ensure its attainment of orbit.

Another consideration was that the Navy proposal used civilian sounding rockets rather than military missiles, which were considered inappropriate for peaceful scientific exploration. What went unstated at the time was that the U.S. already had a covert satellite program underway, WS-117, which was developing the ability to launch spy satellites using USAF Thor IRBMs. The US government was concerned that the Soviets would object to military satellites overflying the Soviet Union as they had to various aircraft incursions and the balloons of the Genetrix project. The idea was that if a clearly "civilian" and "scientific" satellite went up first, the Soviets might not object, and thus the precedent would be established that space was above national boundaries.

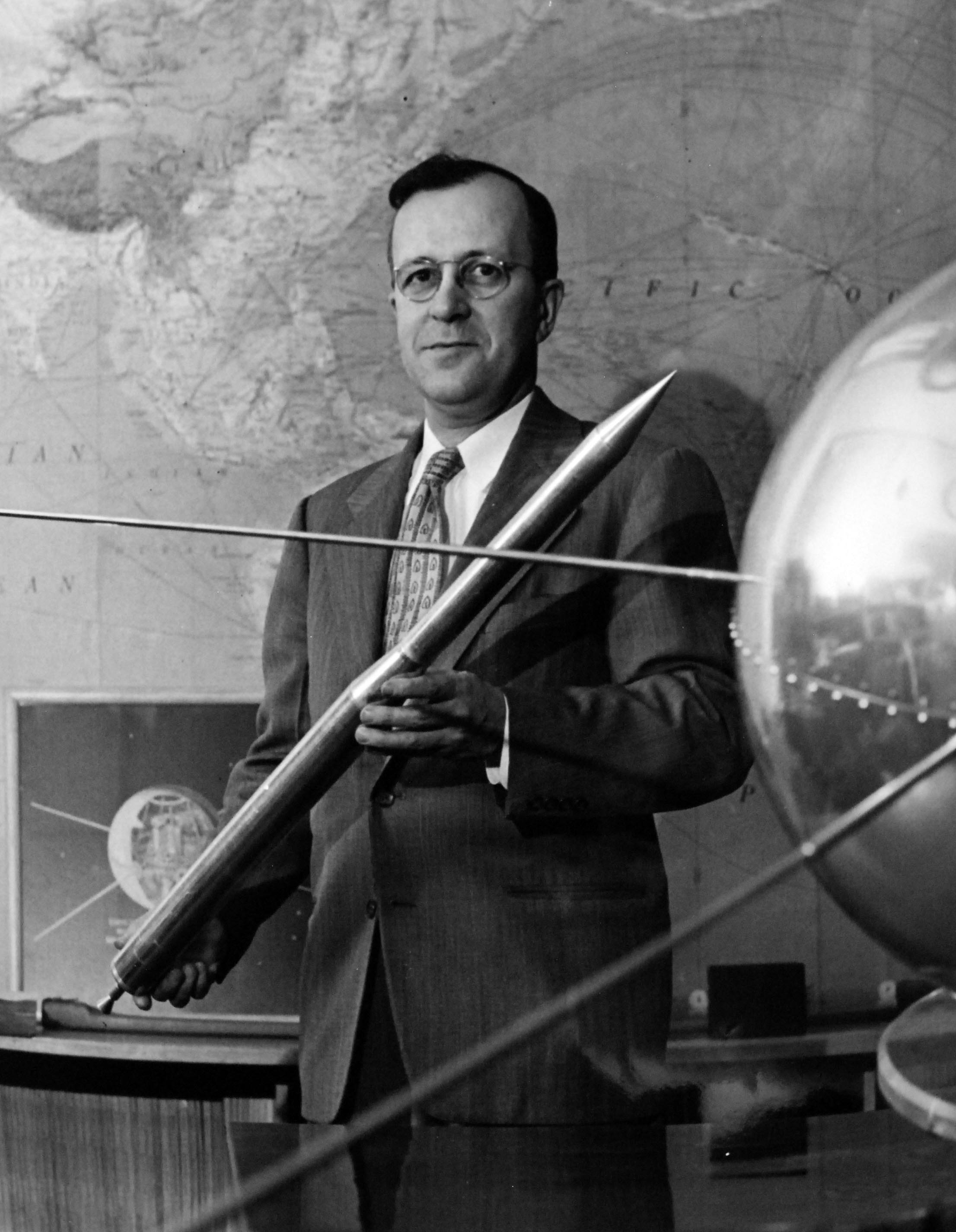
John P. Hagen in 1957

Designated Project Vanguard, the program was placed under Navy management and DoD monitorship. The Naval Research Laboratory (NRL) in Washington was given overall responsibility, while initial funding came from the National Science Foundation. The director was John P. Hagen (1908–1990), an astronomer who in 1958 would become the assistant director of space flight development with the formation of NASA. After a delay due to the NRL changing the shape of the satellite from a conical shape, the initial 1.4 kg (3.1 lb) spherical Vanguard satellites were built at the NRL, and contained as their payload seven mercury cell batteries in a hermetically sealed container, two tracking radio transmitters, a temperature sensitive crystal, and six clusters of solar cells on the surface of the sphere. The first satellite was called Vanguard TV3.

NRL was also responsible for developing the Vanguard rocket launch vehicles through a contract to the Martin Company (which had built the Viking rockets), developing and installing the satellite tracking system, and designing, constructing, and testing the satellites. The tracking system was called Minitrack. The Minitrack stations, designed by NRL but subcontracted to the Army Corps of Engineers, were 14 stations along a north–south line running along the east coast of North America and the west coast of South America. Minitrack was the forerunner of another NRL-developed system called NAVSPASUR, which remains operational today under the control of the Air Force and is a major producer of spacecraft tracking data.

=== Sputnik and Explorer 1 ===
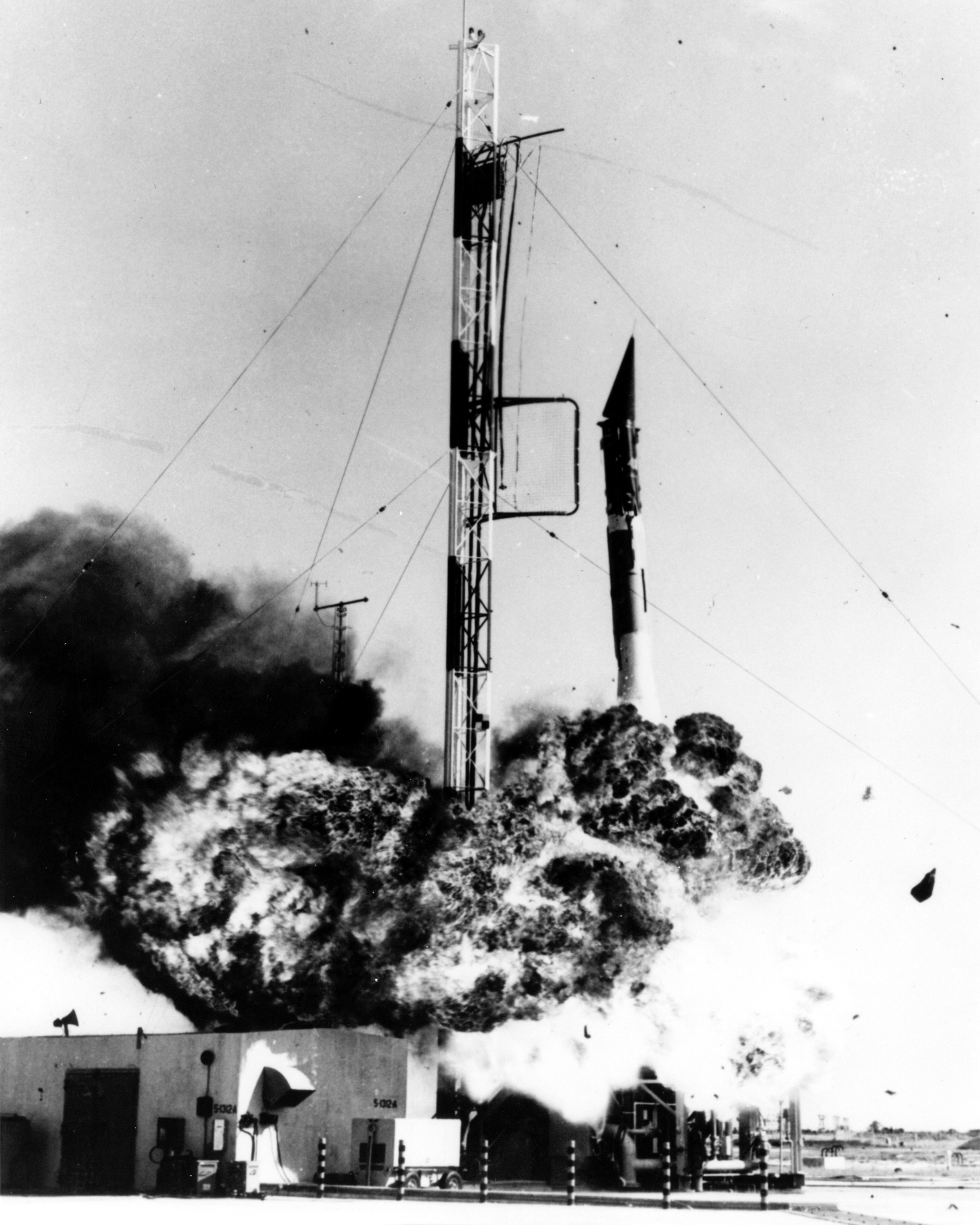
Vanguard rocket explodes seconds after launch at Cape Canaveral (December 6, 1957).

The original schedule called for the TV3 to be launched during the month of September 1957, but because of delays this did not happen. On October 4, 1957, the Vanguard team learned of the launch of Sputnik 1 by the USSR while still working on a test vehicle (TV-2) designed to test the first stage of their launcher rocket. While demoralizing to the Vanguard team, Minitrack was successful in tracking Sputnik, a major success for NRL. At 11:44:35 a.m. on December 6, an attempt was made to launch TV-3. The Vanguard rocket rose about 1.2 m (4 ft) into the air when the engine lost thrust, and the rocket immediately sank back down to the launch pad and exploded. The payload nosecone detached and landed free of the exploding rocket, the small satellite's radio beacon still beeping. The satellite was too damaged for further use; it now resides in the National Air and Space Museum.

After the Soviet Union launched Sputnik 2, on November 3, 1957, then Secretary of Defense Neil H. McElroy directed the U.S. Army to use the Juno I and launch a satellite. On January 31, 1958, the U.S. Army launched the Explorer 1 satellite. With the launch of Sputnik 1 and 2 the previous concern, the right of satellite overflight, had become moot: those satellites were launched by an early version of the Soviet R-7 rocket, the basis of the USSR's early ICBMs, and definitely military, as well as roughly 40 times larger than the Vanguard launcher.

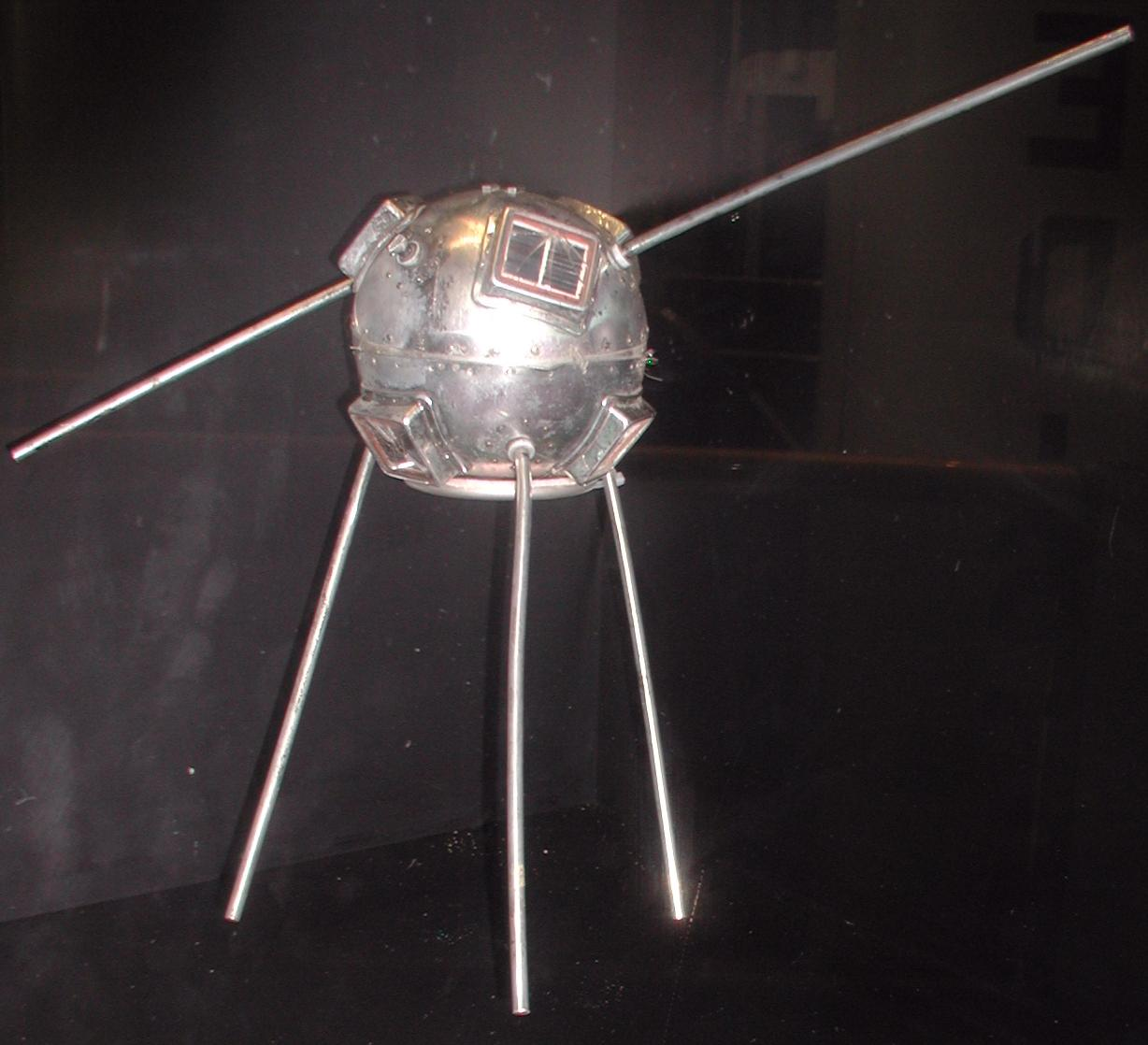
Vanguard TV3 in previous display at the National Air and Space Museum. The antenna rods should extend radially from the body of the satellite, but are bent as a result of damage sustained in the launch failure.

On March 17, 1958, the program successfully launched the Vanguard satellite TV-4. TV-4 achieved a stable orbit with an apogee of 3,969 kilometers (2,466 miles) and a perigee of 650 kilometers (400 miles). It was estimated that it would remain in orbit for at least 240 years, and it was renamed Vanguard I, which in addition to its upper launch stage remains the oldest human-made satellite still in orbit.

In late 1958, with responsibility for Project Vanguard having been transferred to NASA, the nucleus of the Goddard Space Flight Center was formed. After four failed launches, the program once again succeeded with SLV-4, renamed Vanguard II. After two more failures, the program ended with the launch of Vanguard III in 1959.

== Accomplishments ==
Despite being overshadowed by Sputnik 1, and having to overcome the widespread humiliation of its unsuccessful early attempts, the Vanguard Project eventually met its scientific objectives, providing a wealth of information on the size and shape of the Earth, density of air, temperature ranges, and micrometeorite impact. The Vanguard 1 radio continued to transmit until 1964, and tracking data obtained with this satellite revealed that Earth is not quite a perfect sphere: it is slightly pear-shaped, elevated at the North Pole and flattened at the South Pole. It corrected ideas about the atmosphere's density at high altitudes and improved the accuracy of world maps. The Vanguard program was transferred to NASA when that agency was created in mid-1958.

The Vanguard "Satellite Launch Vehicle", a term invented for the operational SLV rockets as opposed to the Test Vehicle TV versions, was a much smaller and lighter launcher than the Redstone-based Jupiter-C/Juno 1 rocket which launched the Explorer satellites, or the immense R-7 that the Soviets used to launch the early Sputniks.

The Vanguard 1 program introduced much of the technology that has since been applied in later U.S. satellite programs, from rocket launching to satellite tracking. For example, it validated in flight that solar cells could be used for several years to power radio transmitters. Vanguard's solar cells operated for about seven years, while conventional batteries used to power another on-board transmitter lasted only 20 days.

Although Vanguard's solar-powered "voice" became silent in 1964, it continues to serve the scientific community. Ground-based optical tracking of the now-inert Vanguards continues to provide information about the effects of the Sun, Moon, and Atmosphere of Earth on satellite orbits. Vanguard 1 marked its 50th year in space on 17 March 2008. In the years following its launch, the small satellite has made more than 196,990 revolutions of the Earth and traveled 5.7 billion nautical miles (10.6 billion kilometres), the distance from Earth to beyond the dwarf planet Pluto and halfway back. Original estimates had the orbit lasting for 2,000 years, but it was discovered that solar radiation pressure and atmospheric drag during high levels of solar activity produced significant perturbations in the perigee height of the satellite, which caused a significant decrease in its expected lifetime to about 240 years.

== Launch history ==
The first Vanguard flight, a successful suborbital test of the Vanguard TV0 single-stage vehicle, was launched on 8 December 1956. On 1 May 1957, the two-stage test vehicle TV1 was successfully launched. Vanguard TV2, another successful suborbital test, was launched 23 October 1957.

The Vanguard rocket launched three satellites out of eleven launch attempts:

1. Vanguard TV3 – 6 December 1957 – Failed to orbit 1.36 kg (3.0 lb) satellite – low tank pressure caused engine cutoff T+2 seconds
2. Vanguard TV3 Backup – 5 February 1958 – Failed to orbit 1.36 kg (3.0 lb) satellite – control failure caused vehicle breakup T+55 seconds
3. Vanguard 1 – 17 March 1958 – Orbited 1.47 kg (3.2 lb) satellite
4. Vanguard TV5 – 28 April 1958 – Failed to orbit 9.98 kg (22.0 lb) satellite – 3rd stage separation failure
5. Vanguard SLV-1 – 27 May 1958 – Failed to orbit 9.98 kg satellite – 2nd stage attitude control failure prevented the 3rd stage from entering the correct angle for orbital insertion
6. Vanguard SLV 2 – 26 June 1958 – Failed to orbit 9.98 kg satellite – 2nd stage lost thrust after only 8 seconds of burning due to fuel line obstruction
7. Vanguard SLV 3 – 28 September 1958 – Failed to orbit 9.98 kg satellite – 2nd stage insufficient thrust for orbital insertion due to fuel line obstruction
8. Vanguard 2 – 17 February 1959 – Orbited 10.8 kg (24 lb) satellite
9. Vanguard SLV 5 – 13 April 1959 – Failed to orbit 10.3 kg (23 lb) satellite – 2nd stage hydraulics failure led to loss of control
10. Vanguard SLV 6 – 22 June 1959 – Failed to orbit 10.3 kg satellite – 2nd stage exploded due to stuck helium vent valve
11. Vanguard 3 –18 September 1959 – Orbited 22.7 kg (50 lb) satellite

== See also ==
- Explorers Program
- List of spacecraft called Sputnik
- Sputnik crisis
