= Sputnik crisis =

United States reaction to the 1957 launch of the Soviet satellite

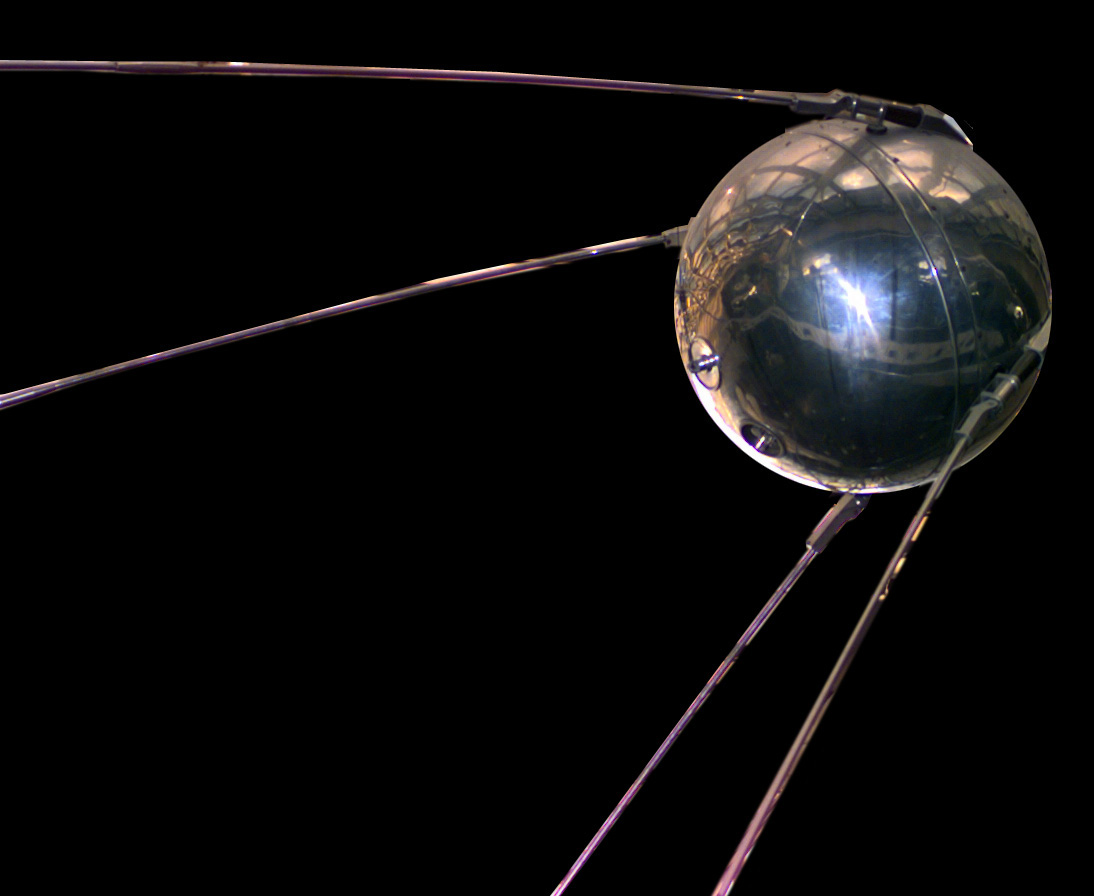
Replica of Sputnik 1

The Sputnik crisis was a period of public fear and anxiety in Western nations about the perceived technological gap between the United States and Soviet Union caused by the Soviets' launch of Sputnik 1, the world's first artificial satellite, on October 4, 1957. The crisis was a significant event in the Cold War that triggered the creation of NASA and the Space Race between the two superpowers. This crisis is also referred to as the "Sputnik Moment", with this term frequently used to describe the phenomenon of a forward technological leap by a nation, followed by greater push in education and research by other nations in order to catch up.

== Background ==
In the early 1950s, Lockheed U-2 spy plane flights over the Soviet Union provided intelligence that the US held the advantage in nuclear capability. However, an education gap was identified when studies conducted between 1955 and 1961 reported that the Soviet Union was training two to three times as many scientists per year as the US. The launch and orbit of Sputnik 1 suggested that the Soviet Union had made a substantial leap in technology, which was interpreted as a serious threat to US national security, spurring the US to boost federal investment in research and development, education, and national security. The Juno I rocket that carried the first US satellite Explorer 1 was ready to launch in 1956, but that fact was classified and unknown to the public. The Army's PGM-19 Jupiter from which Juno was derived had been shelved on the orders of Defense Secretary Charles Erwin Wilson amid interservice rivalry with the US Air Force's PGM-17 Thor rocket.

== Launch ==
The Soviets used ICBM technology to launch Sputnik into space, which gave them two propaganda advantages over the US at once: the capability to send the satellite into orbit and proof of the distance capabilities of their missiles. That proved that the Soviets had rockets capable of sending nuclear weapons to Western Europe and even North America. That was the most immediate threat that Sputnik 1 posed. The United States, a land with a history of geographical security from European wars because of its distance, suddenly seemed vulnerable.

A contributing factor to the Sputnik crisis was that the Soviets had not released a photograph of the satellite for five days after the launch. Until then, its appearance remained a mystery to Americans. Another factor was its weight of 184 pounds (83 kg), compared to US plans to launch a satellite of 21.5 pounds (9.8 kg). The Soviet claim seemed outrageous to many American officials, who doubted its accuracy. US rockets then produced 150,000 pounds-force (670,000 N) of thrust, and US officials presumed that the Soviet rocket that launched Sputnik into space must have produced 200,000 pounds-force (890,000 N) of thrust. In fact, the R-7 rocket that launched Sputnik 1 into space produced almost 1,000,000 pounds-force (4,400,000 N) of thrust. All of those factors contributed to the Americans' perception that they were greatly behind the Soviets in the development of space technologies.

Beeps transmitted by Sputnik 1
The signals of Sputnik 1 continued for 22 days

Hours after the launch, the University of Illinois at Urbana–Champaign Astronomy Department rigged an ad hoc interferometer to measure signals from the satellite. Donald B. Gillies and Jim Snyder programmed the ILLIAC I computer to calculate the satellite orbit from this data. The programming and calculation was completed in less than two days. The rapid publication of the ephemeris (orbit) in the journal Nature within a month of the satellite launch helped to dispel some of the fears created by the Sputnik launch. However, Sputnik was not part of an organized effort to dominate space according to a Soviet space scientist. It could not take pictures, make sophisticated calculations, or carry out orders. Sputnik was only capable of making high pitched beeps allowing it to be tracked for research.

The successful launch of Sputnik 1 and then the subsequent failure of the first two Project Vanguard launch attempts greatly accentuated the US perception of a threat from the Soviet Union that had persisted since the Cold War had begun after World War II. The same rocket that launched Sputnik could send a nuclear warhead anywhere in the world in a matter of minutes, which would strip the Continental United States of its oceanic defenses. The Soviets had demonstrated that capability on 21 August by a 6,000-kilometer (3,700-mile) test flight of the R-7 booster. The event was announced by TASS five days later and was widely reported in other media.

== Media Reaction ==
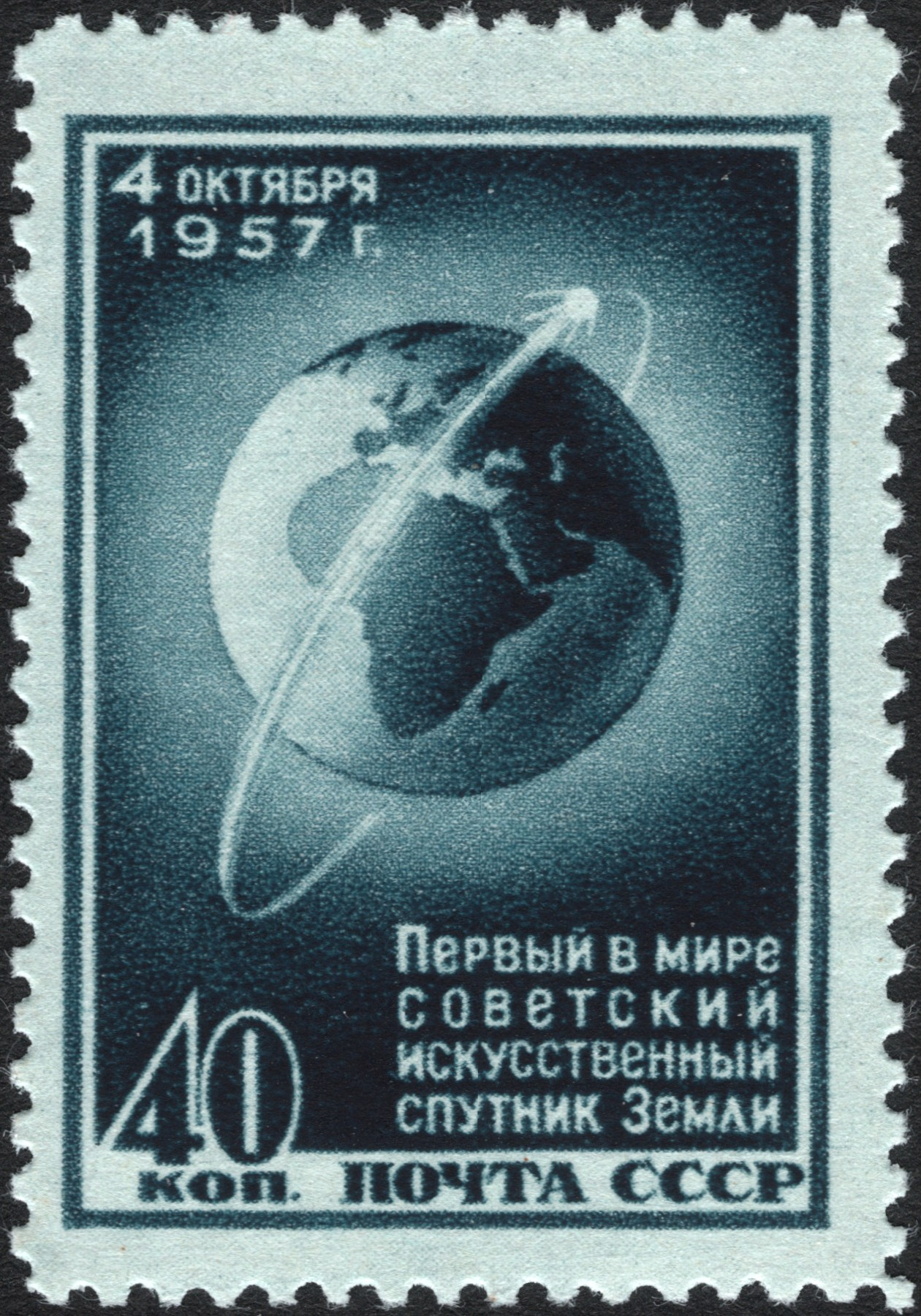
Soviet stamp depicting Sputnik's orbit around Earth

=== United States ===
The media stirred a moral panic by writing sensational pieces on the event. In the first and second days following the event, The New York Times wrote that the launch of Sputnik 1 was a major global propaganda and prestige triumph for Russian communism. Further, Fred Hechinger, a noted American journalist and education editor, reported, "hardly a week passed without several television programs examining education". It was after the people of the United States were exposed to a multitude of news reports that it became a "nation in shock". The media not only reported public concern but also created the hysteria. Journalists greatly exaggerated the danger of the Soviet satellite for their own benefit. On October 9, 1957, science fiction writer and scientist Arthur C. Clarke said that the day that Sputnik orbited around the Earth, the US became a second-rate power.

=== United Kingdom ===
In Britain, the launch of the first Sputnik provoked surprise, combined with elation at experiencing the dawn of the Space Age. It was also a reminder of the decline in the British Empire's world influence. The crisis soon became part of the broader Cold War narrative. The Daily Express predicted that "The result will be a new [U.S.] drive to catch up and pass the Russians in the sphere of space exploration. Never doubt for a moment that America will be successful". The crisis contributed to the US–UK Mutual Defence Agreement of 1958.

=== Soviet Union ===
Nikita Khrushchev, the Soviet leader, reflected on the event by saying, "It always sounded good to say in public speeches that we could hit a fly at any distance with our missiles. Despite the wide radius of destruction caused by our nuclear warheads, pinpoint accuracy was still necessary – and it was difficult to achieve". At the time, Khrushchev stated that "our potential enemies cringe in fright".

== Response ==
=== United States ===
The week after Sputnik went up, we were digging ourselves out of this avalanche of money that suddenly descended.

— John Jefferies, at High Altitude Observatory in 1957

Five days after the launch of Sputnik 1, the world's first artificial satellite, US President Dwight Eisenhower addressed the American people. After being asked by a reporter on security concerns about the Soviet satellite, Eisenhower said, "Now, so far as the satellite itself is concerned, that does not raise my apprehensions, not one iota."

Eisenhower made the argument that Sputnik was only a scientific achievement and not a military threat or change in world power. He believed that Sputnik's weight "was not commensurate with anything of great military significance, and that was also a factor in putting it in [proper] perspective".

In 1958, Eisenhower declared three "stark facts" the United States needed to confront:

- The Soviets had surpassed America and the rest of the "free world" in scientific and technological advancements in outer space.
- If the Soviets maintained that superiority, they might use it as a means to undermine America's prestige and leadership.
- If the Soviets became the first to achieve significantly superior military capability in outer space and created an imbalance of power, they could pose a direct military threat to the US.

Eisenhower followed this statement by saying that the United States needed to meet these challenges with "resourcefulness and vigor". The president also noted the importance of education for the Russians in their recent scientific and technological progress, and called for America to respond with education reform. He remarked, "we need scientists in the ten years ahead...scrutinize your school's curriculum and standards. Then decide for yourselves whether they meet the stern demands of the era we are entering." His ability to project confidence about the situation was limited because his confidence was based on clandestine reconnaissance, so he failed to quell the fears that there was a shift in power between the Americans and Soviets. The launch of Sputnik 1 also impacted Eisenhower's ratings in his polls, but he eventually recovered.

The launch spurred a series of US initiatives ranging from defense to education. Increased emphasis was placed on the US Navy's Project Vanguard to launch an American satellite into orbit. There was a renewed interest in the existing Explorer program, which launched the first American satellite into orbit on January 31, 1958. In February 1958, Eisenhower authorized formation of the Advanced Research Projects Agency, which was later renamed to the Defense Advanced Research Projects Agency (DARPA), within the Department of Defense (DoD) to develop emerging technologies for the US military. On July 29, 1958, he signed the National Aeronautics and Space Act, the creation of NASA.

Less than a year after the Sputnik launch, Congress passed the National Defense Education Act (NDEA). It was a four-year program that poured billions of dollars into the US education system. In 1953, the government spent $153 million, and colleges took $10 million of that funding, but by 1960, the combined funding grew almost six-fold because of the NDEA. After the initial public shock, the Space Race began, which led to the first human launched into space, Project Apollo, and the first humans to land on the Moon in 1969.

Politicians used the event to bolster their ratings in polls. Research and development was used as a propaganda tool, and Congress spent large sums of money on the perceived problem of US technological deficiency. After the launch of Sputnik 1 national security advisers overestimated the Soviets' current and potential rocket strength, which alarmed portions of Congress and the executive branch. When these estimations were released, Eisenhower was forced into an accelerated missile race to appease those concerned with America's safety. Sputnik provoked Congress into taking action on improving the US standing in the fields of science.

Campaigning in 1960 on closing the "missile gap", Eisenhower's successor, John F. Kennedy, promised to deploy 1,000 Minuteman missiles. That was many more ICBMs than the Soviets had at the time. Though Kennedy did not favor a massive US crewed space program when he was in the US Senate during Eisenhower's term, public reaction to the Soviet's launch of the first human into orbit, Yuri Gagarin, on April 12, 1961, led Kennedy to raise the stakes of the Space Race by setting the goal of landing men on the Moon. Kennedy claimed, "If the Soviets control space they can control the earth, as in past centuries the nation that controlled the seas dominated the continents." Eisenhower disagreed with Kennedy's goal and referred to it as a "stunt". Kennedy had privately acknowledged that the space race was a waste of money, but he knew there were benefits from a frightened electorate. The Space Race was less about its intrinsic importance and more about prestige and calming the public. The political analyst Samuel Lubell conducted research on public opinion about Sputnik and found "no evidence at all of any panic or hysteria in the public's reaction", which confirmed that it was an elite, not a popular, panic.

The Sputnik crisis sparked the American drive to retake the lead in space exploration from the Soviets, and it fueled its drive to land men on the Moon. American officials had a variety of opinions at the time, some registering alarm and others dismissing the satellite. Gerald Ford, a Republican US representative from Michigan, had stated, "We Middle Westerners are sometimes called isolationists. I don't agree with the label; but there can be no isolationists anywhere when a thermonuclear warhead can flash down from space at hypersonic speed to reach any spot on Earth minutes after its launching". Former US Rear Admiral Rawson Bennett, chief of naval operations, stated that Sputnik was a "hunk of iron almost anybody could launch", but former US Army general James M. Gavin described it as "a technological Pearl Harbor". Sputnik was "the most serious setback, both psychologically and technically, that we have suffered since World War II ... the most significant military event of our time", he wrote.

The Sputnik crisis also spurred substantial transformation in the US science policy, which provided much of the basis for modern academic scientific research. Astronomer John Jefferies, at the High Altitude Observatory in 1957, recalled that it had received funding mostly from philanthropists. "The week after Sputnik went up, we were digging ourselves out of this avalanche of money that suddenly descended" from the federal government, he said. By the mid-1960s, NASA was providing almost 10% of the federal funds for academic research.

Further expansion was made in the funding and research of space weapons and missile defense in the form of anti-ballistic missile proposals. Education programs were initiated to foster a new generation of engineers and support was dramatically increased for scientific research. Congress increased the National Science Foundation (NSF) appropriation for 1959 to $134 million, almost $100 million higher than the year before. By 1968, the NSF budget stood at nearly $500 million.

According to Marie Thorsten, Americans experienced a "techno-other void" after the Sputnik crisis and still express longing for "another Sputnik" to boost education and innovation. In the 1980s, the rise of Japan (both its car industry and its 5th generation computing project) served to fan the fears of a "technology gap" with Japan. After the Sputnik crisis, leaders exploited an "awe doctrine" to organize learning "around a strong model of educational national security: with math and science serving for supremacy in science and engineering, foreign languages and cultures for potential espionage, and history and humanities for national self-definition". US leaders were not able to exploit the image of Japan as effectively, despite its representations of super-smart students and a strong economy.

=== Canada ===
Canada's reaction to Sputnik was primarily cultural and scientific rather than military. The launch sparked widespread media coverage in Québec and across Canada, with newspapers framing it as a turning point in global technological competition. Canadian scientists, such as those at Chalk River Nuclear Laboratories, tracked Sputnik's orbit and expressed admiration for Soviet engineering. This event accelerated Canadian interest in space science and contributed indirectly to Canada's later development of the Alouette 1 satellite program in the early 1960s, marking Canada as the third nation to enter space. The launch also led the Canadian government to increase research opportunities at universities, with additional funds allocated to institutions like the University of Toronto. The university provided free tuition to students with First Class Honors and additional aid to students with Second Class Honors in order to attract more Canadian students to universities. This proposal was made after University of Toronto Vice President Murray G. Ross made a visit to the Soviet Union in order to see their educational process, and discovered that students in the Soviet Union had no financial burden.

== Sputnik moment ==
The phrase "Sputnik moment" entered the English language to describe similar national situations. The first component is a technoscientific leap by another country. The second component is a national education and research push to catch up on the original leap. Technical or scientific leaps that have been referred to as a Sputnik moment include:

- 2002: Japan's Earth Simulator becomes the world's fastest supercomputer, the United States invests in supercomputers beyond those needed for nuclear stockpile stewardship.
- 2010: China's Tianhe-1A becomes the world's fastest supercomputer.
- 2016: American subsidiary Google DeepMind demonstrates their AI in AlphaGo versus Lee Sedol, China accelerates AI development.
- 2016: China performs the first CRISPR gene editing in humans.
- 2019: American division Google AI claims its Sycamore processor achieves quantum supremacy, completing a task faster than a conventional computer. Subsequent conventional approaches beat the quantum solution time.
- 2025: Chinese company DeepSeek demonstrates their R1 large language model, requiring far less training expenditure and computing power.
- 2025: Waymo and Baidu begin large-scale deployment of robotaxis, respectively, in select cities in the United States and China, after receiving approvals for autonomous operations the year before. The absence of robotaxis in European cities was described by The Economist as a "Sputnik moment" for the European Union, marking the culmination of Europe's catastrophic mismanagement of technology policy, its failure to develop its own Silicon Valley, and its inability to cultivate gigantic tech firms who could have developed uniquely European robotaxis.

== See also ==
- International Geophysical Year
- New Math
- Timeline of events in the Cold War

== Bibliography ==
=== Books ===
- Bruccoli, Matthew J.; Bondi, Victor; Baughman, Judith (1994). Layman, Richard; Tompkins, Vincent (eds.). American Decades: 1950–1959. Vol. 6. Detroit: Gale Research. ISBN 0-810-35727-5.
- Burrows, William E. (1999). This New Ocean: The Story of the First Space Age. New York: The Modern Library. ISBN 978-0-375-75485-2.
- Brzezinski, Matthew (2007). Red Moon Rising: Sputnik and the Hidden Rivalries that Ignited the Space Age. New York: Times Books. ISBN 978-0-8050-8147-3.
- Cadbury, Deborah (2006). Space Race: The Epic Battle Between America and The Soviet Union for Dominion of Space. New York: Harper Collins Publishers. ISBN 978-0-06-084553-7.
- Chaikin, Andrew (1994). A Man on the Moon: The Voyages of the Apollo Astronauts. New York: Viking. ISBN 0-670-81446-6.
- Crompton, Samuel (2007). Sputnik/Explorer 1: The Race to Conquer Space. New York: Chelsea House. ISBN 978-0-7910-9357-3.
- Dickson, Paul (2003). Sputnik: The Shock of the Century. New York: The Berkley Publishing Group. ISBN 0-425-18843-4.
- Hardesty, Von; Eisman, Gene (2007). Epic Rivalry: The Inside Story of the Soviet and American Space Race. Foreword by Sergei Krushchev. Washington, D.C.: National Geographic. ISBN 978-1-4262-0119-6.
- Neufeld, Michael J. (2007). Von Braun: Dreamer of Space, Engineer of War. New York: Alfred A. Knopf. ISBN 978-0-307-26292-9.
- Ordway III, Frederick I.; Sharpe, Mitchell (2007). The Rocket Team. Burlington, Ontario: Apogee Books. ISBN 978-1-894959-82-7.
- Roman, Peter (1995). Eisenhower and the Missile Gap. Ithaca, N.Y: Cornell University Press. ISBN 0-8014-2797-5.
- Schefter, James (1999). The Race: The Uncensored Story of How America Beat Russia to the Moon. New York: Doubleday. ISBN 0-385-49253-7.
- Siddiqi, Asif A. (2003). Sputnik and the Soviet Space Challenge. Gainesville: University of Florida Press. ISBN 0-8130-2627-X.
- Spitzmiller, Ted (2006). Astronautics: A Historical Perspective of Mankind's Efforts to Conquer the Cosmos. Vol. Book 1 — Dawn of the Space Age. Burlington, Ontario: Apogee Books. ISBN 978-1-894959-63-6.
- Thorsten, Marie (2012). Superhuman Japan: Knowledge, Nation and Culture in US-Japan Relations. Oxon, UK: Routledge. ISBN 978-0-415-41426-5.

=== Other online resources ===
- DeNooyer, Rushmore (2007-11-06). "Sputnik Declassified". NOVA (Transcript). PBS. Archived from the original on 2012-10-09.
- "July 29: NASA Created". This Day in History. New York: History Channel. 2012. Archived from the original on 2012-10-08.
- "October 4: Sputnik launched". This Day in History. New York: History Channel. 2012. Archived from the original on 2012-10-09.
- Launius, Roger D. (2005). "Sputnik and the Origins of the Space Age". Sputnik and The Dawn of the Space Age. Washington, D.C.: NASA. Archived from the original on 2012-09-17.
