= Vanguard 1 =

American satellite launched in 1958; oldest manmade object in Earth orbit

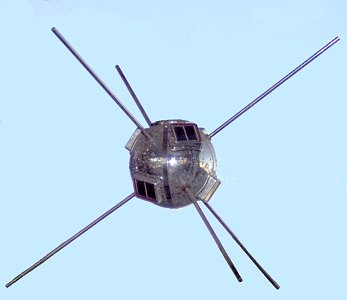
- A model of Vanguard 1
- Names: Vanguard TV-4; Vanguard Test Vehicle-Four
- Mission type: Earth science
- Operator: Naval Research Laboratory
- Harvard designation: 1958-Beta 2
- COSPAR ID: 1958-002B
- SATCAT no.: 00005
- Mission duration: 90 days (planned); 68 years, 4 months and 2 days (in orbit)

Spacecraft properties
- Spacecraft: Vanguard 1
- Spacecraft type: Vanguard
- Manufacturer: Naval Research Laboratory
- Launch mass: 1.46 kg (3.2 lb)
- Dimensions: 152 mm (6.0 in) diameter, 3.0 ft (0.91 m) antenna span

Start of mission
- Launch date: 17 March 1958, 12:15:41 GMT
- Rocket: Vanguard TV-4
- Launch site: Cape Canaveral, LC-18A
- Contractor: Glenn L. Martin Company

End of mission
- Last contact: May 1964
- Decay date: 2198 (estimated); ~ 240 years orbital lifetime

Orbital parameters
- Reference system: Geocentric orbit
- Regime: Medium Earth orbit
- Perigee altitude: 654 km (406 mi)
- Apogee altitude: 3,969 km (2,466 mi)
- Inclination: 34.25°
- Period: 134.27 minutes

Vanguard 1 (Harvard designation: 1958-Beta 2, COSPAR ID: 1958-002B) is an American satellite that was the fourth artificial Earth-orbiting satellite to be successfully launched, following Sputnik 1, Sputnik 2, and Explorer 1. It was launched 17 March 1958. Vanguard 1 was the first satellite to have solar electric power. Although communications with the satellite were lost in 1964, it remains the oldest artificial object still in orbit, together with the upper stage of its launch vehicle.

Vanguard 1 was designed to test the launch capabilities of a three-stage launch vehicle as a part of Project Vanguard, and the effects of the space environment on a satellite and its systems in Earth orbit. It also was used to obtain geodetic measurements through orbit analysis. Vanguard 1, being small and light enough to carry with one hand, was described by the Soviet Premier, Nikita Khrushchev, as "the grapefruit satellite".

== Spacecraft design ==
The spacecraft is a 1.46 kg (3.2 lb) aluminum sphere six inches (150 mm) in diameter, with antennas spanning three feet (0.91 m). It contains a 10 mW, 108 MHz transmitter powered by a mercury battery and a 5 mW, 108.03 MHz transmitter that was powered by six solar cells mounted on the body of the satellite. Six 30 cm (12 in) long antennas, 0.8 cm (0.31 in) diameter spring-actuated aluminum alloy aerials protrude from the sphere. The transmitters were used primarily for engineering and tracking data, but were also used to determine the total electron content between the satellite and the ground stations.

A backup version of Vanguard 1 is on display at the Smithsonian National Air and Space Museum, Steven F. Udvar-Hazy Center in Chantilly, Virginia.

== Mission ==
Universal Newsreel about the launch of Vanguard 1

On 17 March 1958, the three-stage launch vehicle placed Vanguard into a 654 km × 3,969 km (406 mi × 2,466 mi), 134.27-minute elliptical orbit inclined at 34.25°. Original estimates had the orbit lasting for 2,000 years, but it was discovered that solar radiation pressure and atmospheric drag during high levels of solar activity produced significant perturbations in the perigee height of the satellite, which caused a significant decrease in its expected lifetime to about 240 years. Vanguard 1 transmitted its signals for over six years as it orbited the Earth.

=== Radio beacon ===
A 10 mW mercury-battery-powered telemetry transmitter on the 108 MHz band used for International Geophysical Year (IGY) scientific satellites, and a 5 mW, 108.03 MHz Minitrack transmitter powered by six solar cells were used as part of a radio phase-comparison angle-tracking system. The system transmitted signals through the satellite's six spring-loaded aluminum alloy aerials. Satellite tracking was achieved using these transmitters and Minitrack ground stations situated around the globe.

These radio signals were used to determine the total electron content between the satellite and selected ground-receiving stations. The battery-powered transmitter provided internal package temperature for about 16 days and sent tracking signals for 20 days. The solar-cell-powered transmitter operated for more than six years. Signals gradually weakened and were last received at the Minitrack station in Quito, Ecuador, in May 1964. Since then the spacecraft has been tracked optically from Earth, via telescope.

=== Design for atmospheric density measurements ===
Because of its symmetrical shape, Vanguard 1 was used by experimenters for determining upper atmospheric densities as a function of altitude, latitude, season, and solar activity. As the satellite continuously orbited, it would deviate from its predicted positions slightly, accumulating greater and greater shift due to drag of the residual atmosphere. By measuring the rate and timing of orbital shifts, together with the body's drag properties, the relevant atmosphere's parameters could be back-calculated. It was determined that atmospheric pressures, and thus drag and orbital decay, were higher than anticipated, since Earth's upper atmosphere does taper off into space gradually.

This experiment was planned extensively prior to launch. Initial Naval Research Laboratory (NRL) proposals for the project included conical satellite bodies; this eliminated the need for a separate fairing and ejection mechanisms, and their associated weight and failure modes. Radio-tracking would gather data and establish a position. Early in the program, optical tracking (with a Baker-Nunn camera network and human spotters) was added. A panel of scientists proposed changing the design to spheres, at least 50.8 cm (20.0 in) in diameter and hopefully 76.2 cm (30.0 in).

A sphere would have a constant optical reflection, and constant coefficient of drag, based on size alone, while a cone would have properties that varied with its orientation. James Van Allen of the University of Iowa proposed a cylindrical satellite based on his work with rockoons, which became Explorer 1, the first American satellite. The Naval Research Laboratory finally accepted a sphere with a 16.5 cm (6.5 in) of diameter as a "Test Vehicle", with a diameter of 50.8 cm (20.0 in) set for the follow-on satellites. The weight savings, from reduced size as well as decreased instrumentation in the early satellites, was considered to be acceptable.

As Vanguard 1, Vanguard 2, and Vanguard 3 are still orbiting with their drag properties essentially unchanged, they form a baseline data set on the atmosphere of Earth that is over 65 years old and continuing.

== After the mission ==
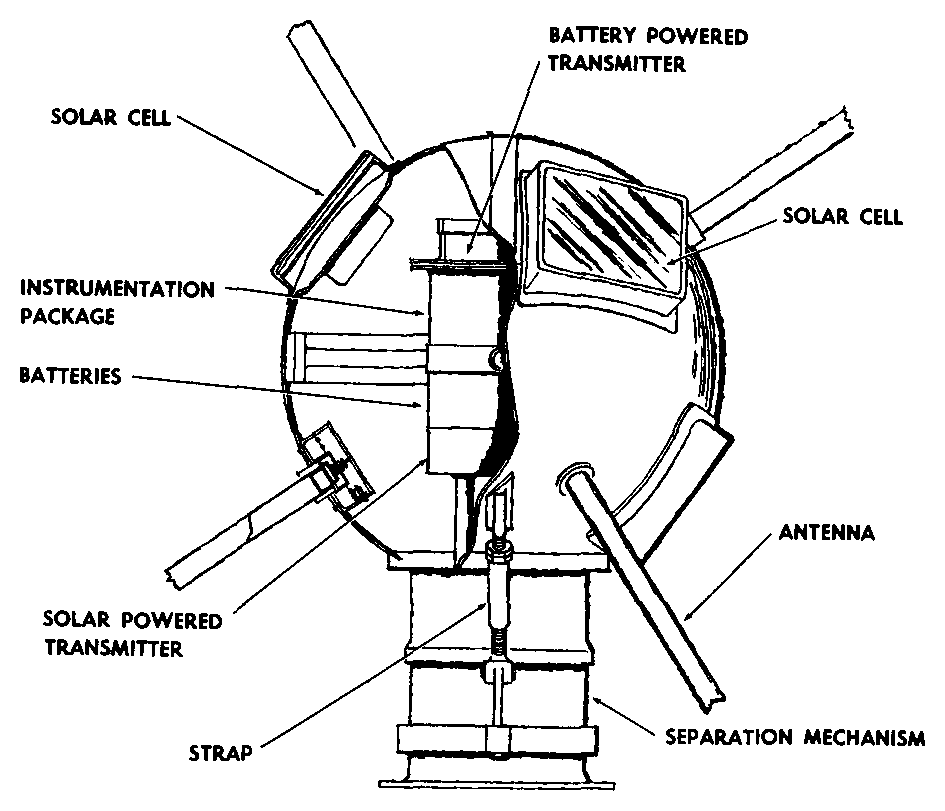
Vanguard 1 satellite sketch

After its scientific mission ended in 1964, Vanguard 1 became a derelict object – as did the upper stage of the launch rocket, after it finished the delta-v maneuver to place Vanguard 1 in orbit in 1958. Both objects remain in orbit. Vanguard 1 was projected to remain aloft for up to 2,000 years, but solar radiation pressure and atmospheric drag perturbations during periods of high solar activity affected its perigee, reducing its lifetime, and now it is expected to burn up in the atmosphere after about 240 years in orbit, sometime in the late 22nd century. As space travel becomes routine, and especially when its re-entry date draws near, some have suggested that the satellite might be retrieved as a valued artifact of early space exploration.

=== 50th anniversary ===
The Vanguard 1 satellite and upper launch stage hold the record for being in space longer than any other human-made object, and as such have traveled farther over the Earth's surface than any other human-made object.

A small group of former NRL and NASA workers had been in communication with one another, and a number of government agencies were asked to commemorate the event. The Naval Research Laboratory commemorated the event with a day-long meeting at NRL on 17 March 2008. The meeting concluded with a simulation of the satellite's track as it passed into the orbital area visible from Washington, D.C., (where it is visible from the Earth's surface). The National Academy of Sciences scheduled seminars to mark the 50th anniversary of the International Geophysical Year.

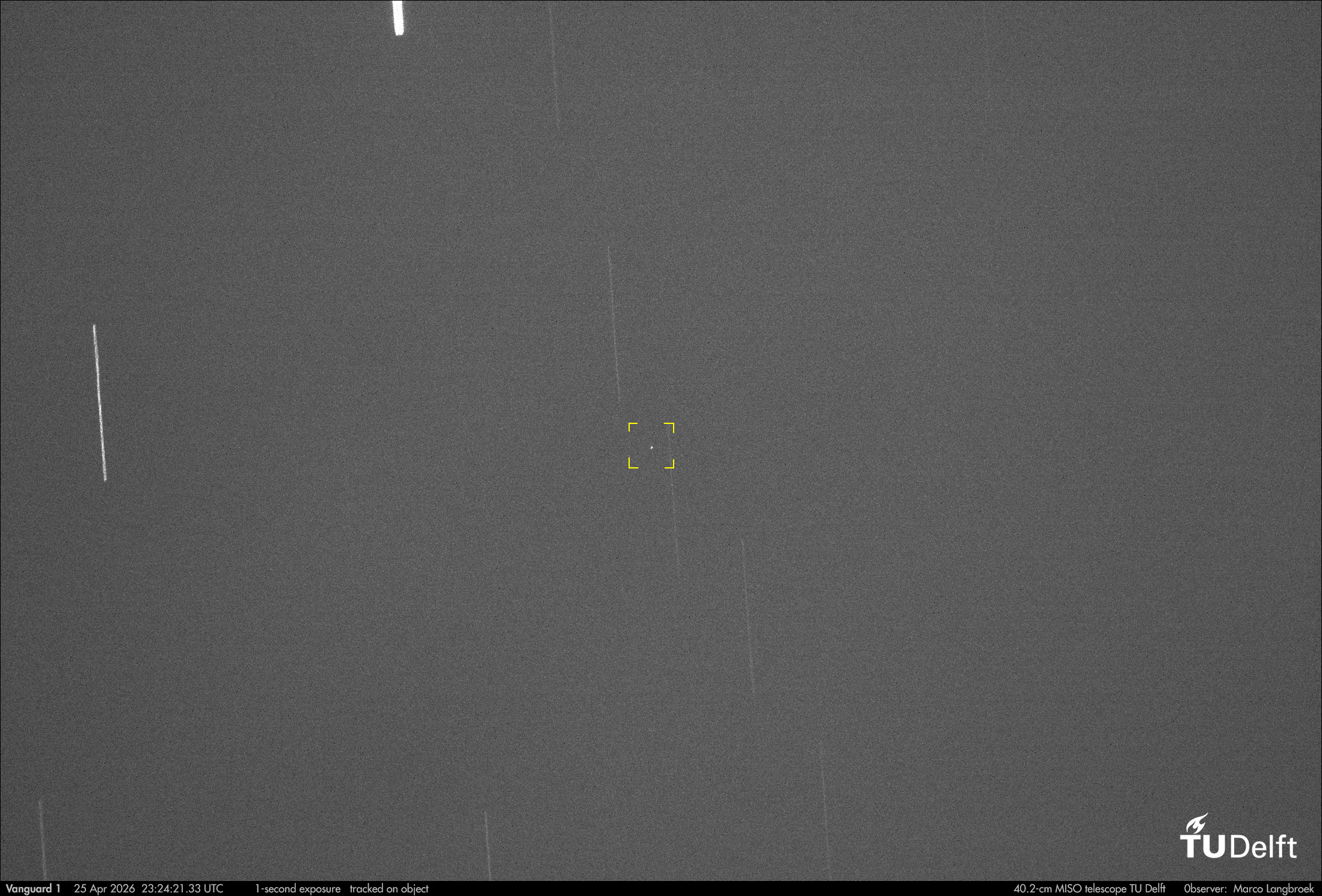
The Vanguard 1 satellite imaged on 25 April 2026 with the 40.2-cm MISO telescope of Delft University of Technology

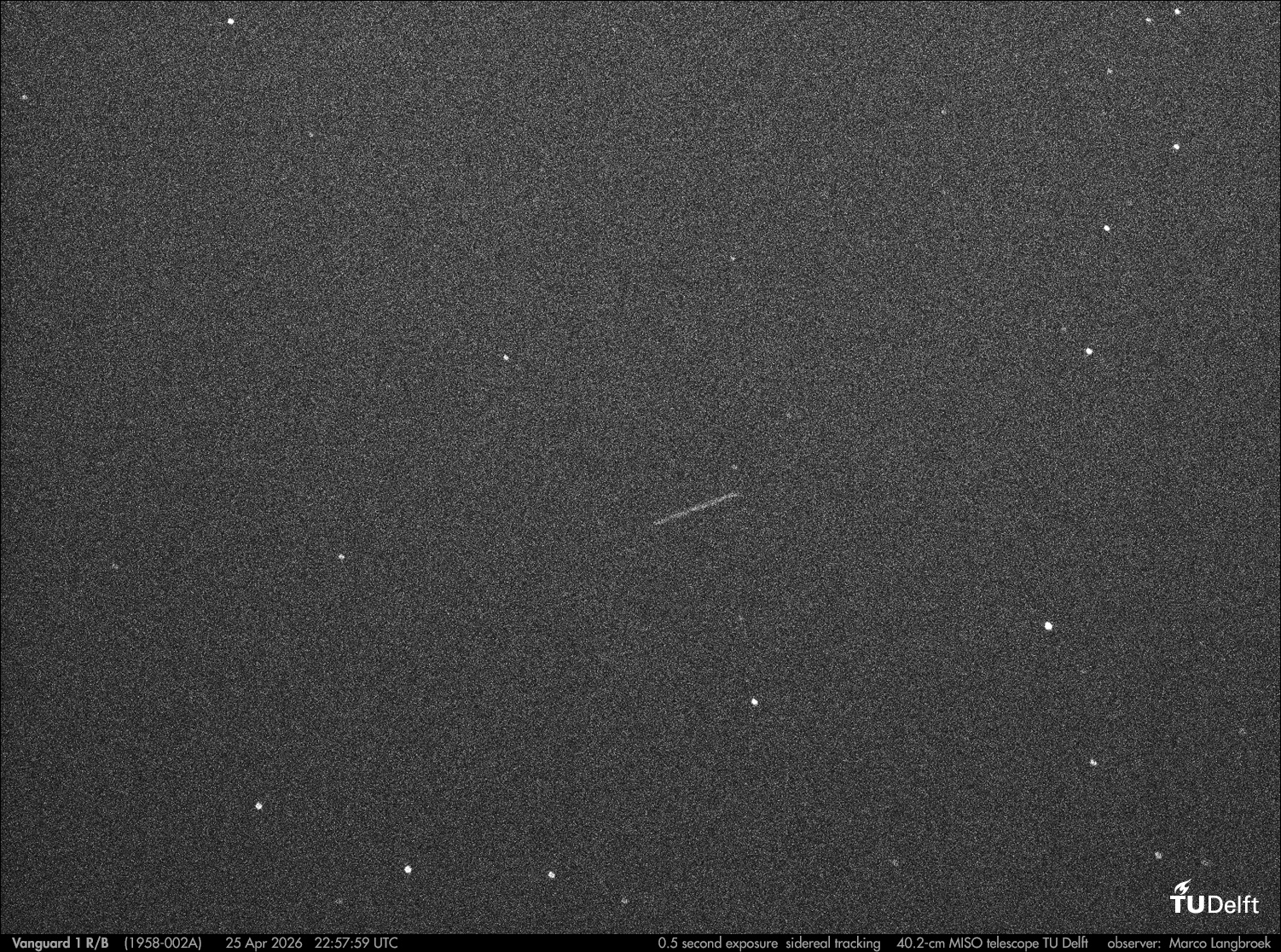
The Vanguard 1 upper stage imaged on 25 April 2026 with the 40.2-cm MISO telescope of Delft University of Technology

== See also ==
- Timeline of artificial satellites and space probes
