= Explorer S-1 (satellite) =

NASA satellite of the Explorer program

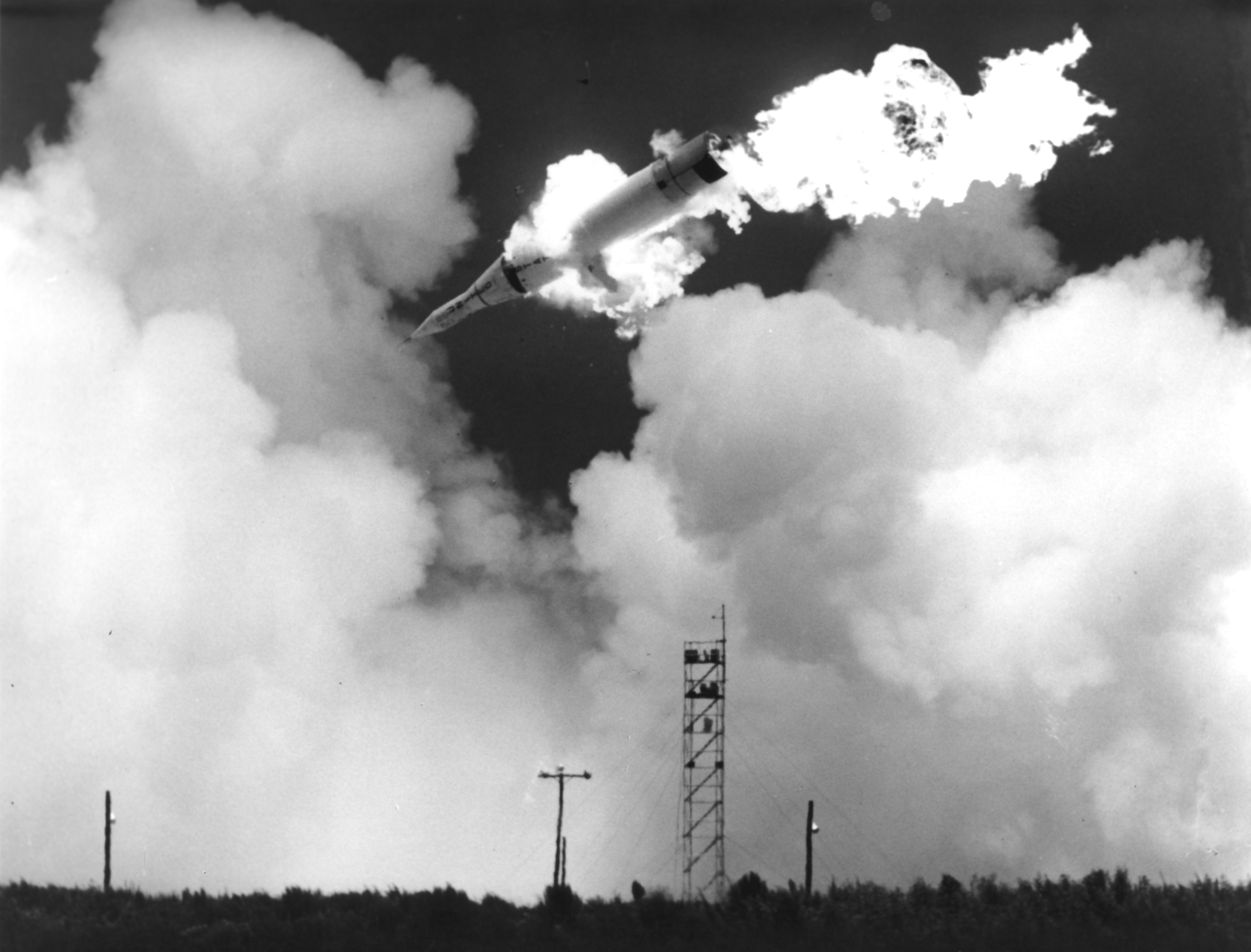
- The Juno II launch vehicle carrying Explorer S-1 destroyed by the Range Safety Officer 5.5 seconds after liftoff.
- Names: Explorer S-1; Explorer 7X; NASA S-1
- Mission type: Earth science
- Operator: NASA
- COSPAR ID: EXP-7X
- Mission duration: Failed to orbit

Spacecraft properties
- Spacecraft: Explorer S-1
- Spacecraft type: Science Explorer
- Bus: S-1
- Manufacturer: Jet Propulsion Laboratory
- Launch mass: 41.5 kg (91 lb)
- Dimensions: 76 × 76 cm (30 × 30 in)

Start of mission
- Launch date: 16 July 1959, 17:37:03 GMT
- Rocket: Juno II (AM-16)
- Launch site: Cape Canaveral, LC-5
- Contractor: Army Ballistic Missile Agency

End of mission
- Destroyed: Failed to orbit

Orbital parameters
- Reference system: Geocentric orbit (planned)
- Regime: Low Earth orbit
- Perigee altitude: 416 km (258 mi)
- Apogee altitude: 2,286 km (1,420 mi)
- Inclination: 49.9°
- Period: 112.7 minutes

Instruments
- Ground Based Ionospheric; Heavy Primary Cosmic Rays; Micrometeorite; Solar X-Ray and Lyman-Alpha Radiation; Thermal Radiation; Trapped Radiation and Solar Protons

Explorer S-1, also known as NASA S-1 or Explorer 7X, was a NASA Earth science satellite equipped with a suite of scientific instruments to study the environment around the Earth. The spacecraft and its Juno II launch vehicle were destroyed five seconds after launch on 16 July 1959, in a spectacular launch failure caused by complications with the launch vehicle's power supply. A relaunch of the mission in October 1959, Explorer 7 (S-1A), was successful.

== Mission ==
The mission was planned to be the sixth flight of the Explorer program, designated NASA S-1 and Explorer 7X retrospectively. The objectives of the mission were to measure the Earth's radiation balance, and the abundance of Lyman-alpha X-rays and cosmic rays, including heavy primary cosmic rays. The spacecraft was also designed as a test bed for satellite capabilities, being equipped with instruments to measure the spacecraft's temperature, micrometeorite impacts and the erosion of solar cells exposed to the vacuum of space. The spin-stabilized spacecraft was 76 × 76 cm (30 × 30 in) in size, and had a launch mass of 41.5 kg (91 lb). The spacecraft's power was drawn from a bank of fifteen nickel–cadmium batteries recharged by 3,000 solar cells mounted on the exterior of the spacecraft.

== Launch ==
The spacecraft was mounted atop a Juno II launch vehicle with the serial AM-16. It was launched on 16 July 1959, at 16:37:03 GMT, from Cape Canaveral Launch Complex 5 (LC-5). Immediately after liftoff, a short circuit of the launch vehicle's guidance system caused the Rocketdyne S-3D engines to gimbal, tilting the rocket sharply to the west before almost flipping upside down. Five-and-a-half seconds after launch, the Range Safety Officer destroyed the launch vehicle. The launch vehicle's payload impacted the ground 76 m (249 ft) northwest of the launch site, resulting in a massive fireball.

== Aftermath ==
In an investigation conducted after the launch failure, it was found that the short circuit occurred between two diodes in the launch vehicle's power supply inverter voltage regulator, cutting off power to the guidance system and causing a full gimbal. Circuit board designs for the Juno II, and similar launch vehicles, subsequently used conformal coating to reduce the chances for a recurrence. The launch, described by commentators as "infamous" and "one of the most spectacular failures ever seen at [Cape Canaveral]", was the third of the Juno II launch vehicle, after it failed to carry Pioneer 3 into heliocentric orbit in December 1958, but succeeded in the same objective in March 1959, carrying the United States' first interplanetary mission, Pioneer 4. The charred, melted remains of the State University of Iowa's cosmic ray instrument were recovered by George H. Ludwig after the failed launch; he turned them over to the National Air and Space Museum in the early 2000s.

S-1 was the first geocentric orbit launch attempt for the launch vehicle; its second attempt on 14 August 1959, carrying the Beacon 2 inflatable sphere experiment to low Earth orbit, also failed. Eventually, both the Juno II and a re-launch of the S-1 mission, designated Explorer 7 or S-1A, found success on 13 October 1959. The satellite, which ended its mission in August 1961, is still orbiting the Earth today.

== See also ==
- Vanguard TV3
- Explorer 7
- Explorer program
