= Explorer 7 =

Seventh satellite of the Explorer program

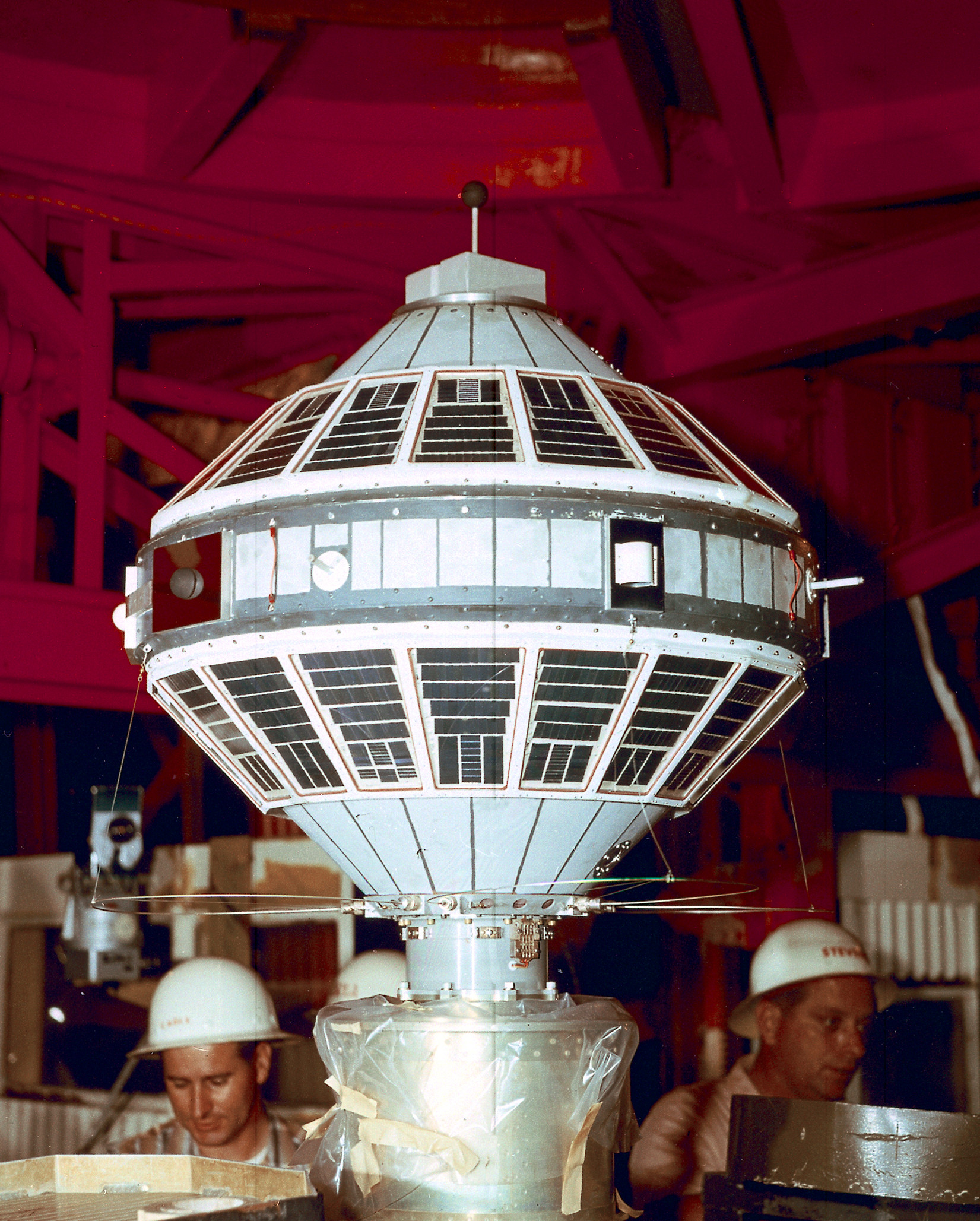
- Explorer 7 satellite
- Names: NASA S-1A
- Mission type: Earth science
- Operator: NASA
- Harvard designation: 1959 Iota 1
- COSPAR ID: 1959-009A
- SATCAT no.: 00022
- Mission duration: 1 year, 10 months and 10 days (achieved); 66 years, 9 months and 1 day (in orbit)

Spacecraft properties
- Spacecraft: Explorer VII
- Spacecraft type: Science Explorer
- Bus: S-1A
- Manufacturer: Jet Propulsion Laboratory
- Launch mass: 41.5 kg (91 lb)
- Dimensions: 76 × 76 cm (30 × 30 in)

Start of mission
- Launch date: 13 October 1959, 15:30:04 GMT
- Rocket: Juno II (AM-19A)
- Launch site: Cape Canaveral, LC-5
- Contractor: Army Ballistic Missile Agency
- Entered service: 13 October 1960

End of mission
- Last contact: 24 August 1961

Orbital parameters
- Reference system: Geocentric orbit
- Regime: Low Earth orbit
- Perigee altitude: 573 km (356 mi)
- Apogee altitude: 1,073 km (667 mi)
- Inclination: 50.27°
- Period: 101.38 minutes

Instruments
- Ground Based Ionospheric; Heavy Primary Cosmic Rays; Micrometeorite; Solar X-Ray and Lyman-Alpha Radiation; Thermal Radiation; Trapped Radiation and Solar Protons

Explorer 7, launched 13 October 1959, was the last of the satellites developed for use during the International Geophysical Year. It was much heavier than its predecessor satellites and equipped with an extensive suite of experiments, with which it studied the Earth and the orbital environment during its year-and-a-half of operation in orbit. Perhaps Explorer 7's most significant achievement was an ongoing map of the Earth's radiation budget—the rate of planetary heating and cooling—thus inaugurating (along with the TIROS 1 weather satellite) climate studies from orbit. Explorer 7 also returned a wealth of information on cosmic rays, Earth's ionosphere, and the Van Allen belts of radiation girdling the planet. Though the satellite was supposed to study the Sun in the X-Ray and Ultraviolet wavelengths, its sensors were saturated by radiation and returned no useful data.

Launched into a 573 × 1,073 km (356 × 667 mi) low Earth orbit by a Juno 2 rocket, Explorer 7 is still circling the Earth as of 2025, though the spacecraft stopped transmitting in 1961.

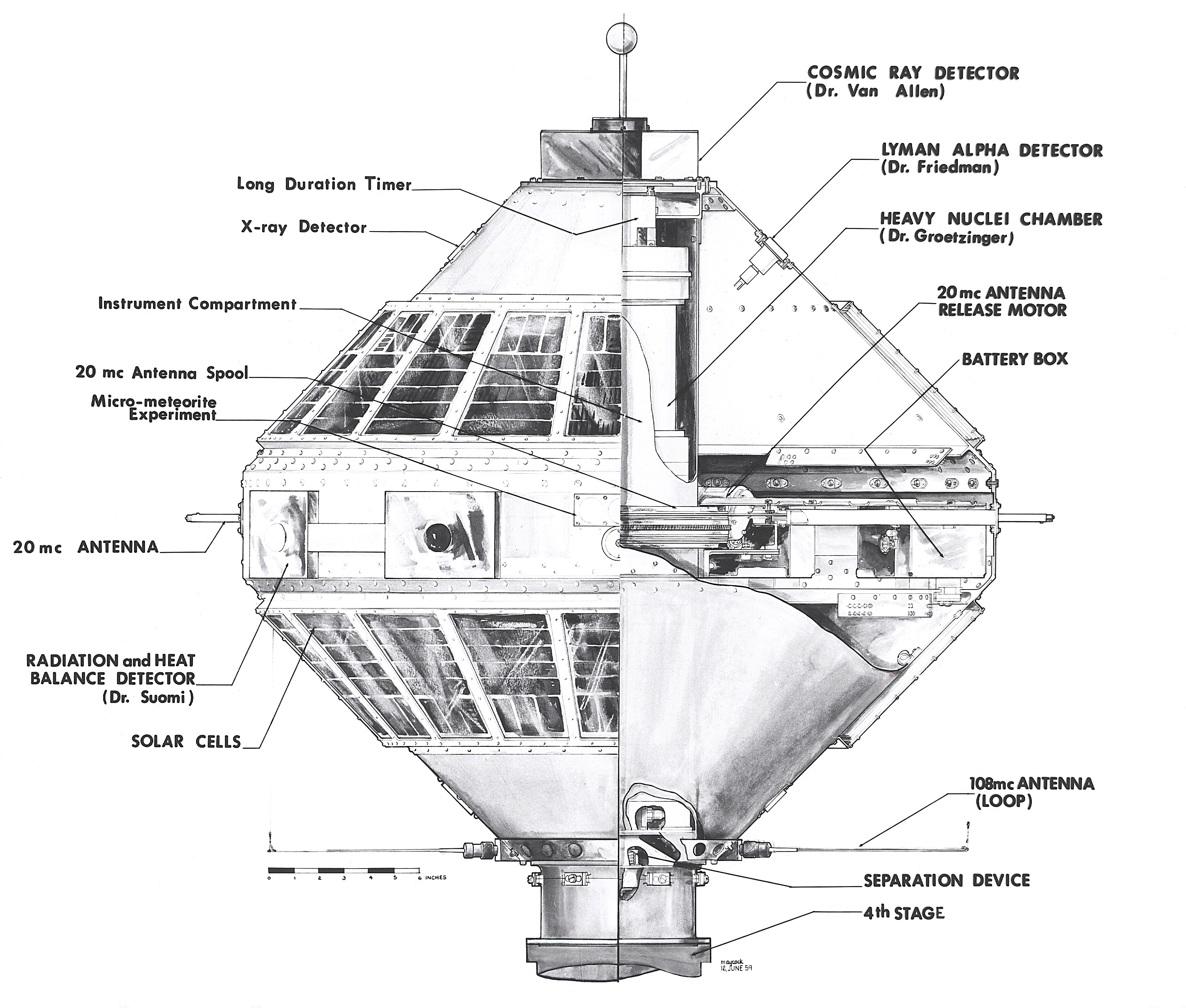
Cutaway of Explorer 7

== Background ==
With the success of America's first artificial satellite, Explorer 1 in January/February 1958, planning began almost immediately thereafter (March 1958) for a heavier, second-generation American satellite. Jet Propulsion Laboratory (JPL) and the Army Ballistic Missile Agency (ABMA), the entities managing the Explorer program and the Juno 1 rocket that launched it, envisioned the utilization of a bigger rocket, the Juno 2, which would share the same upper stages, but use a Jupiter missile as its first stage rather than the smaller Redstone. Appropriately, the satellite was initially known as the International Geophysical Year (IGY) Heavy Payload.

Such an advanced satellite with the capacity to carry a multitude of experiments offered the opportunity not only to learn more about the Van Allen Belts discovered by Explorers 1 and 3, but also an unprecedented chance to observe the Sun in wavelengths of light, such as X-ray and ultraviolet, that are blocked from ground observation by Earth's atmosphere. Although sub-orbital sounding rockets had made previously short observations, solar output is unpredictable and fluctuates rapidly, making long-term, continuous study preferable. A satellite in orbit can make those kinds of observations.

Wavelengths of light blocked by Earth's atmosphere.

Prior to the establishment of NASA, primary support for the satellite was provided by the National Academy of Sciences. Originally planned for launch in Mid-1958, this schedule slipped as ABMA and JPL focused their attention on Explorer 4, Explorer 5, Pioneer 3, and Pioneer 4. The State University of Iowa (SUI), whose science team under James Van Allen had provided the Geiger counter for Explorer 1, was also occupied developing equipment for and processing the data returned by prior Explorer satellites.

It was not until 16 July 1959 when the first of the JPL heavy satellites, now called S-1 by NASA, was ready for launch. Unfortunately, the power supply for the Juno 2 rocket's guidance system failed upon lift-off, and 5.5 seconds later, the range safety officer exploded the nearly-full rocket just off the launch pad. It took firefighters more than an hour to put out the resulting conflagration, which kept the science and engineering crew trapped in their protective blockhouses. Three months later, however, a duplicate satellite was ready for launch.

== Satellite description ==
Explorer 7 (like its S-1 predecessor) was made of two truncated conical fiberglass shells joined by a cylindrical aluminum center section, 76 cm (30 in) wide at its equator and about 76 cm (30 in) high. The payload massed about 41.5 kg (91 lb). Spin stabilized, the spacecraft was powered by approximately 3000 solar cells mounted on both the upper and lower shells. Additional power was provided by 15 rechargeable nickel-cadmium batteries positioned on its equator near the outer skin to help maintain a proper spin rate.

Two crossed dipole (1 W, 20-MHz) telemetry antennas projected outward from the center section, and a 108-MHz antenna was mounted on the bottom of the lower shell. Communications and tracking were provided by a 108-MHz transmitter at 15-mW designed to operate for 2 months and an all-transistor beacon telemetry transmitter operated at a fundamental frequency of 19.9915 MHz. This transmitter, powered by solar cells and rechargeable nickel-cadmium batteries, provided 660-mW of power at the fundamental frequency. It also radiated in its second and third harmonics (15-mW each) at 39.9830 and 59.9745-MHz. As Explorer 7 passed over beacon receivers in Washington, D.C. and Chicago, Illinois, measurements of the Earth's ionosphere could be made by analyzing its effects on the broadcast signals. This beacon transmitter was designed for cut-off after one year as solar-powered satellites can operate indefinitely and it was feared that too many operating in orbit would crowd the commonly used 20-MHz frequency. For this purpose, ABMA included a Bulova timer powered by a one-billionth horsepower battery.

== Experiments ==
Aside from the beacon ionospheric experiment, Explorer 7 was equipped with a number of scientific packages provided by several commercial and educational agencies:

=== Radiation and Heat Balance experiment ===
A University of Wisconsin team, Dr. Verner E. Suomi and Robert Parent, created the Explorer 7 thermal radiation experiment designed to measure Earth's radiation budget—how much solar energy was absorbed, reflected, and emitted by the Earth and its atmosphere—so as to obtain a better understanding of the driving forces of the Earth-atmosphere system.

Its primary instrumentation consisted of five bolometers in the form of hollow silver hemispheres that were thermally insulated from, but in close proximity to specially aluminized mirrors. The hemispheres thereby behaved very much like isolated spheres in space. Two of the hemispheres had black coatings and responded about equally to solar and terrestrial radiation. A third hemisphere, coated white, was more sensitive to terrestrial radiation than to solar radiation. A fourth, which had a gold metal surface, was more sensitive to solar radiation than to terrestrial radiation. The fifth hemisphere, protected from direct sunlight, was used to measure the reflected sunlight. A glass-coated bead thermistor was mounted on the top of each hemisphere to measure the temperature. A complete set of four temperature observations and one reference sample required 30 seconds. Thus, in each orbit, about 180 temperature measurements could be obtained.

=== Trapped Radiation and Solar Protons ===
The State University of Iowa (SUI) cosmic ray study team under James Van Allen was tapped to produce a package to continue cosmic ray research in orbit, priority increasing with Explorer 1, 3, and 4's discovery of the Van Allen Belts. Two omnidirectional Geiger counters (Anton 302 and 112) mounted at the top of the satellite were used to conduct a comprehensive spatial and temporal monitoring of total cosmic-ray intensity, geomagnetically trapped corpuscular radiation, and solar protons. The detector was sensitive to protons (E >20 MeV) and electrons (E >30 keV). George H. Ludwig was the principal designer, assisted by Bill Whelpley, with graduate student John W. Freeman calibrating the counters, and Brian O'Brian joined the team in August 1959 as an assistant professor to assist in data analysis. Telemetry would be broadcast on two frequencies: 108.00 and 19.994 MHz; the low frequency and the relatively high power output of .6 watt was to make it easy for amateur radio enthusiasts to help collect data.

=== Heavy Primary Cosmic Rays ===
Gerhardt Groetzinger's team at the Glenn L. Martin Company Research Institute for Advanced Studies in Baltimore, Maryland developed a Heavy Cosmic Ray Experiment designed to measure the flux of heavy primary cosmic rays from all directions in the rigidity (momentum divided by charge) range of 1 to 15.5 GV. Particles with atomic numbers Z>5, Z>8, and Z>15 were counted separately by an ionization chamber in which each particle that struck it yielded a pulse. While the pulse amplitude was substantially independent of the energy of the incident particle, it was proportional to the square of its Z value. Each of the three counting rates was determined every 15 seconds.

=== Solar X-Ray and Lyman-Alpha Radiation ===
A Naval Research Laboratory team led by Herbert Friedman and Talbot Chubb provided a solar X-ray and Lyman-alpha radiation experiment. It included gas ionization chambers mounted on opposite sides of the upper portion of the double cone configuration of the satellite. Intensities were monitored in order to obtain a long-term history of solar X-ray and Lyman-alpha fluxes and to correlate these with terrestrial atmospheric responses. The two X-ray detectors (2.5 cm (0.98 in) deep) were filled with argon gas and had beryllium windows (.021 g/sq cm) resulting in a sensitivity to X-rays in the 2 to 8 A range. The Lyman-alpha detectors (on the opposite side), which were circular ionization chambers (1.9 cm (0.75 in) in diameter) filled with nitric oxide gas, had lithium fluoride windows. Their sensitivity was in the 1050 to 1350 A interval.

=== Micrometeorite ===
Marshall Space Flight Center's Herman E. Laggow, project manager for Explorer 7, sponsored the satellite's micrometeorite detector. Three photoconducting cadmium sulfide cells, mounted on a magnesium plate on the satellite's equator facing outward perpendicular to the satellite's spin axis, would measure micrometeorite penetration and molecular sputtering. The three cells were identical in design and effective area (18 sq mm).

== Launch and flight ==
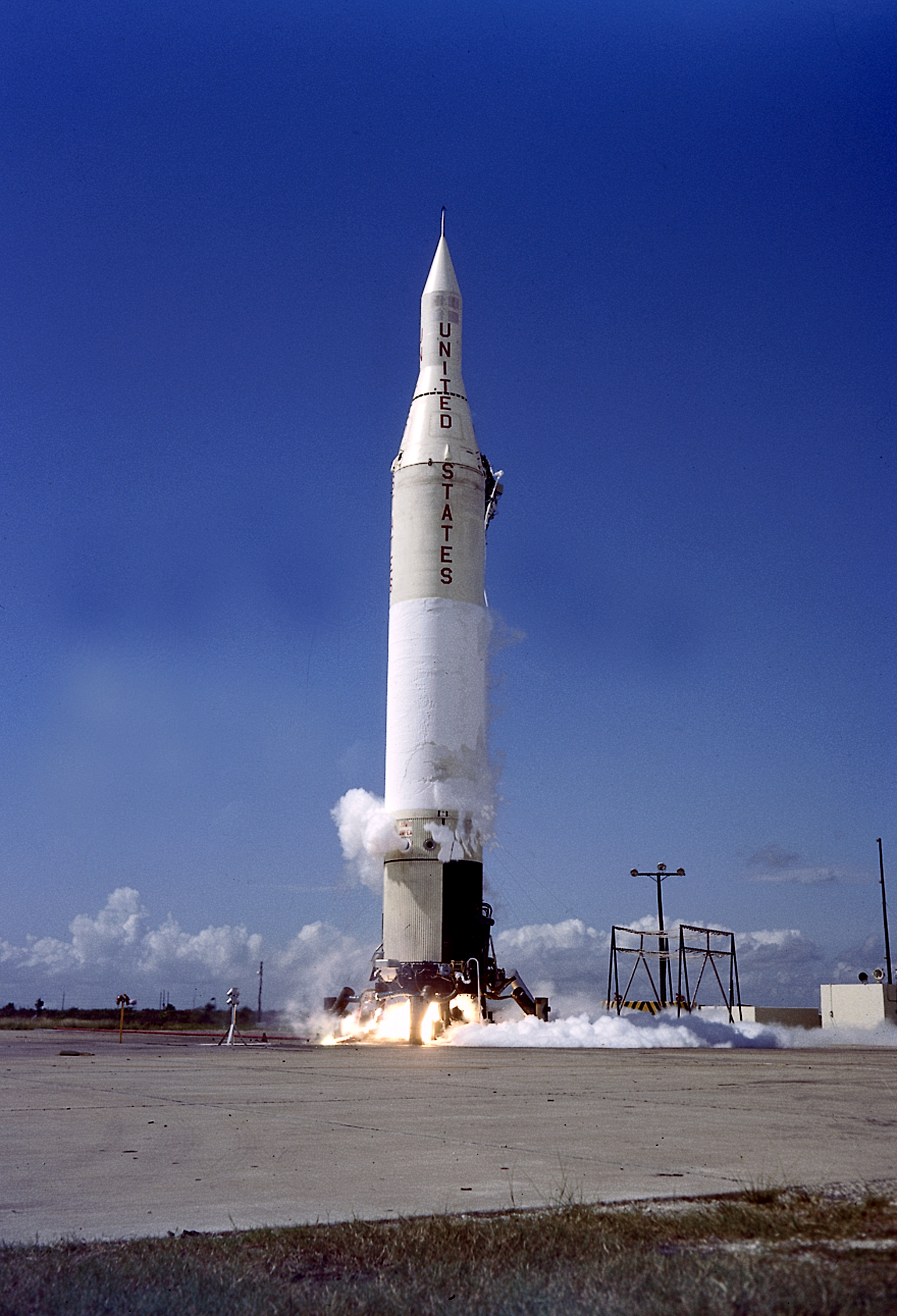
The ignition of Juno II (AM-19A). Juno II (AM-19) successfully placed a physics and astronomy satellite, Explorer VII, in orbit on October 13, 1959

The launch of Explorer 7 was originally scheduled for late September 1959, but the mission was delayed for two weeks after a Jupiter IRBM test on an adjacent pad failed shortly after liftoff, causing flying debris to hit and damage Explorer 7's launch vehicle. But on 13 October 1959 at 15:31 GMT, Explorer 7, the last of the satellites developed for launch during the International Geophysical Year, was launched ten months after the end of the IGY from the Atlantic Missile Range into a 573 × 1,073 km (356 × 667 mi) orbit and began operations.

On 16 June 1960, NASA announced one of the four frequency modulated subcarriers on the second transmitter had become erratic and the information it was transmitting on 3 of the 7 experiments was no longer intelligible. The tracking beacon ceased transmitting on 5 December 1959.

The on-board Bulova shut-down timer did not activate after a year of flight, as intended, nor did it turn off Explorer 7 when the timer reached the end of its 9000 hour lifetime. Instead, useful real-time data on the remaining experiments were transmitted from launch through February 1961 and intermittently until 24 August 1961. By September 1960, Explorer 7's orbit had evolved to be 554 × 1,083 km (344 × 673 mi) with an inclination of 50.3° and a period of 101.2 minutes.

As of 2025 Explorer 7 is still in orbit, and its orbit can be tracked.

== Scientific results ==
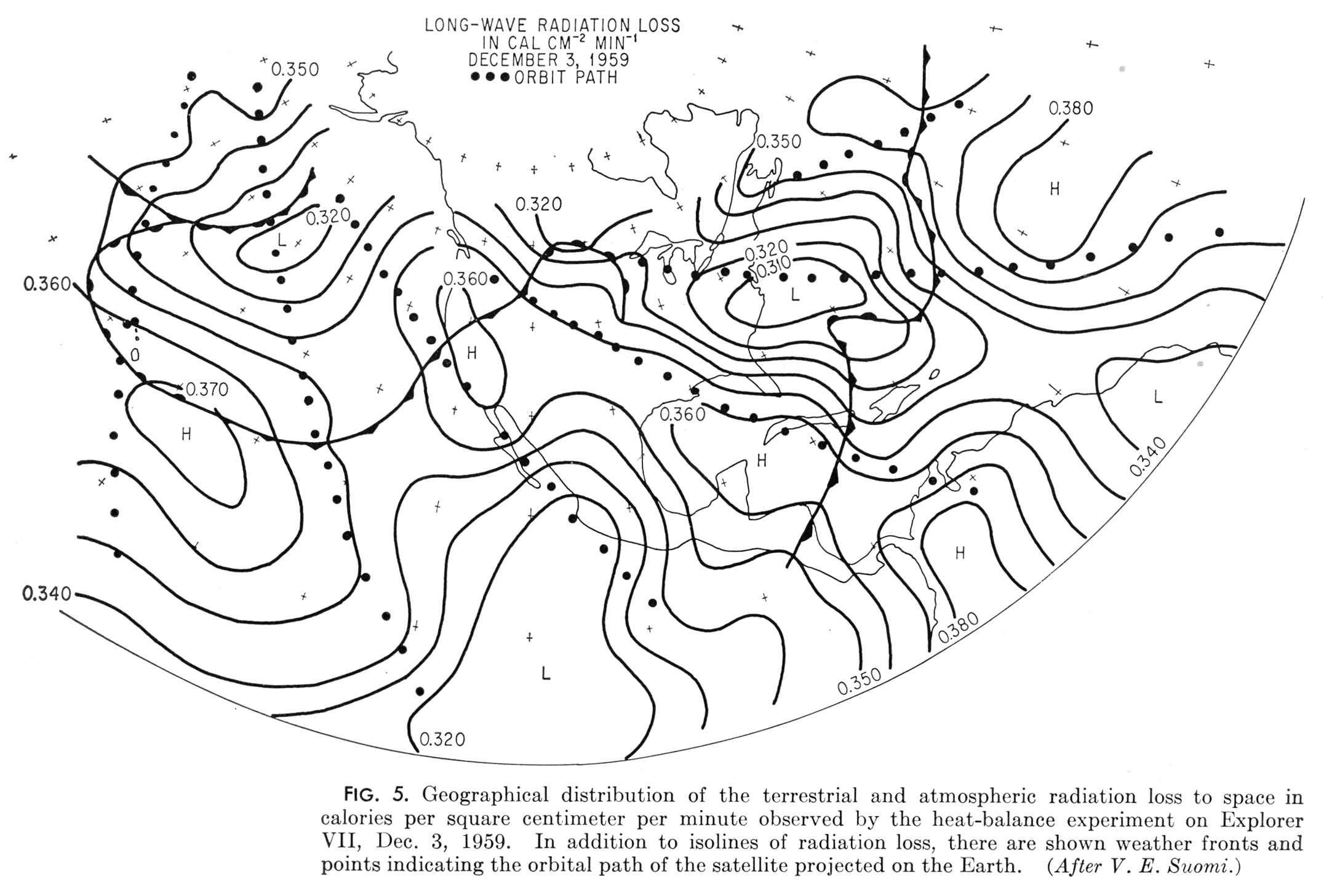
Map of Earth's Long-Wave Radiation Loss as measured by Explorer 7, Dec. 3, 1959

=== Heat Balance ===
The University of Wisconsin's heat balance instrument worked perfectly, and usable data were obtained from launch until 28 February 1961. It made the first coarse maps of "the solar radiation reflected by the Earth and the infrared radiation emitted by the Earth". Over the next seven years, scientists were able to make further conclusions hundreds of thousands of measurements taken by Explorer 7 (as many as 432,000 made in a single month). The lack of a data storage unit made analysis more difficult, as results were transmitted piecemeal rather than all at once as a global map. Thus, the results were tackled in components. First, scientists calculated Earth's radiation losses. By combining Explorer 7 data with pictures transmitted by TIROS weather satellites, it was determined that Earth's heat loss was largely dependent on cloud cover. By the end of 1965, findings on Earth's heat gains from solar radiation were published, and climate scientists began to develop an understanding of how heating and cooling in Earth's atmosphere drive the planet's weather.

Versions of Suomi's experiment were later flown on several TIROS satellites, starting with TIROS 3.

=== Radiation in orbit ===
The SUI Trapped Radiation and Solar Protons experiment operated satisfactorily from launch, except for a brief period in September and October 1960, through early March, but its results proved anti-climactic: Explorer 4 had already mapped the lower edges of the Van Allen Belts, and both Sputnik 3 and Explorer 6 had more sensitive instruments than Explorer 7. Moreover, the deep space missions of Pioneer 3 and Pioneer 4, as well as the high-ranging orbit of Explorer 6, had returned data on the Belts from much further in space. Despite this, Explorer 7 still returned a great deal of data on short- and long-term variations in radiation flux over the long period of the experiment's operation. Notably, on 28 November 1959, Explorer 7 soared over a Montana aurora and returned data that indicated the outer Van Allen Belt had become momentarily unstable. This confirmed the theory that aurorae are fed by particles dumped from the outer Van Allen Belt.

The Heavy Primary Cosmic Rays experiment performed as planned from launch until 25 October 1959. About 80% of the data acquired for the 25 October 1959 to 31 May 1960 period were useful, with most problems occurring in the lowest Z (atomic number) mode. Very little useful data were acquired after 31 May 1960. Sadly, by the time Explorer 7 launched, Groetzinger, creator of the experiment package, had died. Martin A. Pomerantz, associated with the Bartol Research Laboratory, assumed responsibility for the results, publishing several papers from them. Significant findings included that solar disturbances were the source of the detected heavy particles, that time of day influenced the flux of heavy cosmic rays, and that the energy of particles detected was inversely proportional to the number counted.

On 31 March 1960, sensors on Explorer 7 recorded a drastic change in the outer Van Allen Belt corresponding with a severe magnetic storm, which was simultaneously tracked by ground stations and Pioneer 5. This data helped confirm the theory that magnetic storms were caused by magnetized plasma clouds ejected by the Sun during solar flares.

=== Solar X-Ray and Lyman-Alpha Radiation ===
The data collected by the Solar X-Ray and Lyman-Alpha Radiation were impossible to interpret in terms of incident solar radiation due to both the saturation of detector circuits by Van Allen radiation (150 keV electrons) (as had also happened on Vanguard 3 ) and electronic difficulties in the feedback amplifier. Successful measurement of solar X-rays would have to wait for next year's SOLRAD 1, which also carried an NRL payload, this one magnetically shielded.

=== Micrometeorite ===
The onboard micrometeorite experiment was exposed to the space environment of micrometeorites, trapped radiation, and sputtering for 38 days of active life. One of the three cells was damaged on launch, another returned no data. The third, however, was penetrated on the 13th day by a particle (either a micrometeoroid or the result of sputtering) approximately .001 in (0.025 mm) in diameter.

=== Ionosphere ===
Explorer 7's ionospheric experiment returned data over a period of 16 months. Interpretation of the changes of beacon signal characteristics between Explorer 7 and the ground stations showed irregularities in the Earth's ionosphere with horizontal dimensions of 5 km (3.1 mi) to 500 km (310 mi) to be present at all times of the day.

== See also ==
- S-1 (satellite)
- Explorer program
