= S46 =

S46 may refer to:

== Submarines ==
- HMS Churchill (S46), of the Royal Navy
- INS Shalki (S46), of the Indian Navy
- USS S-46 (SS-157), of the United States Navy

== Other uses ==
- S46 (Berlin), a line of the Berlin S-Bahn
- S46 (New York City bus), serving Staten Island
- Blériot-SPAD S.46, a French biplane airliner
- Explorer S-46 (satellite), a failed American spacecraft
- GER Class S46, a British steam locomotive
- Parti Melayu Semangat 46, a defunct political party in Malaysia
- S46: If swallowed, seek medical advice immediately and show this container or label, a safety phrase
- SABCA S-46, a Belgian aircraft
- Sulfur-46, an isotope of sulfur
