= Explorer S-46 (satellite) =

NASA satellite of the Explorer program

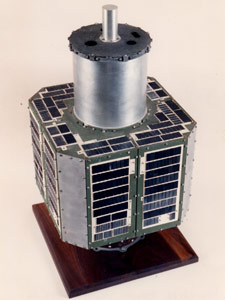
- Prototype satellite payload of the Explorer S-46 satellite (Gift of James A. Van Allen and the University of Iowa)
- Names: NASA S-46
- Mission type: Earth science
- Operator: NASA / JPL
- COSPAR ID: EXS-46
- Mission duration: Failed to orbit

Spacecraft properties
- Spacecraft: Explorer S-46
- Spacecraft type: Science Explorer
- Bus: S-46
- Manufacturer: Jet Propulsion Laboratory
- Launch mass: 41 kg (90 lb)
- Dimensions: 76 × 76 cm (30 × 30 in)
- Power: 100 watts

Start of mission
- Launch date: 23 March 1960, 13:35:11 GMT
- Rocket: Juno II (AM-19C)
- Launch site: Cape Canaveral, LC-26B
- Contractor: Army Ballistic Missile Agency

End of mission
- Destroyed: Failed to orbit

Orbital parameters
- Reference system: Geocentric orbit (planned)
- Regime: Medium Earth orbit
- Perigee altitude: 573 km (356 mi)
- Apogee altitude: 1,073 km (667 mi)
- Inclination: 50.27°

Instruments
- Cadmium sulfide (CdS) Proton Detector; Cadmium sulfide (CdS) Particle Detector; Electron Spectrometer; High Energy Geiger–Müller Tube; Medium Energy Geiger–Müller Tube

Explorer S-46 was a NASA satellite with a mass of 41 kg (90 lb). It was the last of the original series of Explorer satellites built, designed, and operated by the Jet Propulsion Laboratory and Army Ballistic Missile Agency (ABMA).

== Mission ==
Its mission was to analyze electron and proton radiation energies in a highly elliptical orbit.

== Spacecraft ==
Explorer S-46 was a joint ABMA / NASA-JPL mission. The payload detector experiments were developed by the State University of Iowa. The detector assembly comprised five instruments: a Cadmium sulfide (CdS) broom low-energy proton detector, a Cadmium sulfide (CdS) low-energy particle detector; an electron spectrometer; a Geiger-Müller high-energy particle counter; and a Geiger-Müller medium energy particle counter. These were housed in the front of the Sergeant rocket engine that comprised the fourth (upper-stage) of the Juno II launch vehicle.

== Payload experiments ==
- Cadmium sulfide (CdS) Proton Detector
- Cadmium sulfide (CdS) Particle Detector
- Electron Spectrometer
- High Energy Geiger–Müller Tube
- Medium Energy Geiger-Müller Tube

== Juno II ==
The four-stage Juno II launch vehicle used a Jupiter missile as the first stage. The second stage was assembled as a circumferential "tub" of 11 scaled-down Sergeant rocket engines (solid propellant), the third stage was assembled as three scaled-down Sergeant rocket engines nested in the center of the "tub", and a single modified Sergeant rocket engine and casing comprising the fourth stage was mounted on top of this.

== Launch ==
Explorer S-46 was launched using a Juno II launch vehicle on 23 March 1960, at 13:35:11 GMT, from LC-26B. Telemetry was lost shortly after the first stage burnout and one second stage motor failed to ignite, resulting in imbalanced thrust and inability to reach orbital velocity. The spacecraft did not achieve orbit.

== See also ==
- Explorer 8
- Explorer program
