= Explorer 11 =

NASA satellite of the Explorer program

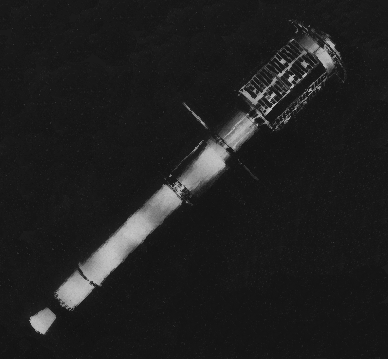
- Explorer-11 satellite
- Names: S-15; NASA S-15
- Mission type: Gamma-ray astronomy
- Operator: NASA
- Harvard designation: 1961 Nu 1
- COSPAR ID: 1961-013A
- SATCAT no.: 00107
- Website: Explorer 11 at GSFC
- Mission duration: 6 months and 20 days

Spacecraft properties
- Spacecraft: Explorer XI
- Spacecraft type: Science Explorer
- Bus: S-15
- Manufacturer: Goddard Space Flight Center
- Launch mass: 37.2 kg (82 lb)

Start of mission
- Launch date: 27 April 1961, 14:16:38 GMT
- Rocket: Juno II (AM-19E)
- Launch site: Cape Canaveral, LC-26B
- Contractor: Army Ballistic Missile Agency
- Entered service: 27 April 1961

End of mission
- Last contact: 17 November 1961

Orbital parameters
- Reference system: Geocentric orbit
- Regime: Low Earth orbit
- Perigee altitude: 486 km (302 mi)
- Apogee altitude: 1,786 km (1,110 mi)
- Inclination: 28.90°
- Period: 108.10 minutes

Instruments
- Crystal Sandwich / Cherenkov Counter; Phoswich-Cherenkov Counter Telescope

Explorer 11 (also known as S-15) was a NASA satellite that carried the first space-borne gamma-ray telescope. This marked the beginning of space gamma-ray astronomy. Launched on 27 April 1961 by a Juno II, the satellite returned data until 17 November 1961, when power supply problems ended the science mission. During the spacecraft's seven-month lifespan it detected twenty-two events from gamma-rays and approximately 22,000 events from cosmic radiation.

== Launch ==
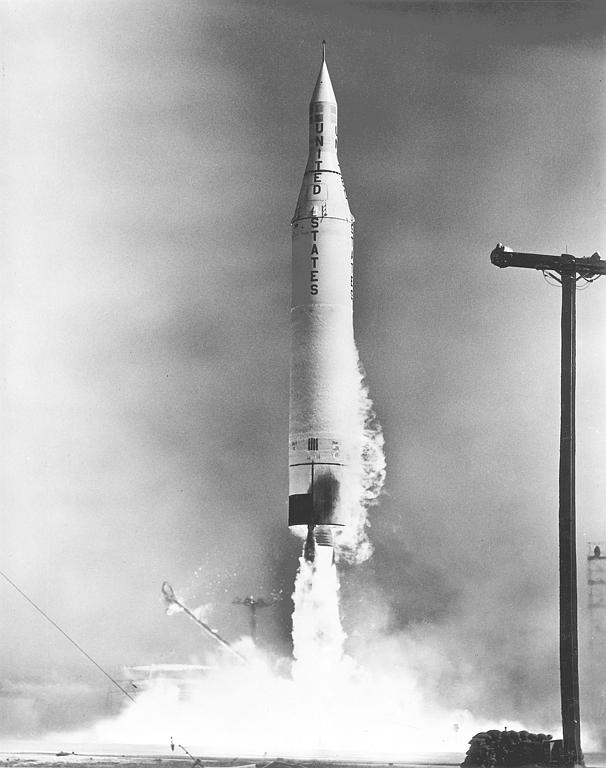
Juno II with Explorer 11

Explorer 11 was launched for the purpose of detecting the sources of high-energy gamma rays. The spacecraft achieved an orbit with an apogee of 1,786 km (1,110 mi), a perigee of 486 km (302 mi), a period of 108.10 minutes, and an inclination of 28.90°. In addition to detecting gamma rays, Explorer 11 was designed to map their direction with emphasis on the plane of the galaxy, the Galactic Center, the Sun, and other known radio noise sources; to relate the measurements to the cosmic-ray flux density and the density of interstellar matter; and to measure the high-energy gamma-ray albedo of the Earth's atmosphere. The satellite was a spin-stabilized octagonal aluminum box (30.5 × 30.5 × 58.5 cm (12.0 × 12.0 × 23.0 in)) on a cylinder (15.2 cm (6.0 in) in diameter and 52.2 cm (20.6 in) long). Explorer 11 was constructed so that its stable motion was an end-over-end tumble about the transverse principal axis that had the largest moment of inertia. The gamma-ray telescope assembly was mounted so that its axis of sensitivity, which was parallel to the long axis of the satellite, would rotate in the plane of tumble. The orientation of this axis in space was determined to approximately 5° by means of optical aspect detectors and the use of the known radiation pattern of the vehicle antenna. Telemetry was provided only in real time by two PM transmitters, since the onboard tape recorder failed at launch.

== Instruments ==
=== Crystal Sandwich / Cherenkov Counter ===
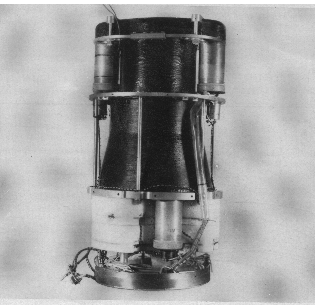
Gamma-ray detector placed onboard Explorer 11 satellite

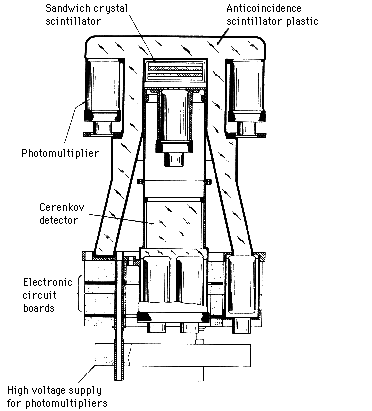
Diagram of gamma-ray detector

The instrumentation for the Explorer 11 crystal sandwich Cherenkov detector experiment was the same as that used for the gamma-ray telescope experiment. The gamma-ray experiment was designed by researchers at the Massachusetts Institute of Technology (MIT) primarily to detect cosmic gamma rays greater than 50 MeV. Charged particle data were collected using the same instrument. This telescope was used to determine the intensity and pitch-angle distribution of geomagnetically trapped protons. The telescope consisted of an anticoincidence plastic shield, layers of Sodium iodide (NaI) and Caesium iodide (CsI) crystals, and a cylindrical Cherenkov detector. When the anticoincidence requirement of the plastic scintillator shield was removed, charged particle information was recorded by all three counters. In addition, charged particle coincidences between the crystal sandwich and Cherenkov detectors were recorded. In this mode, directional information was obtained. The solid-angle-area factor of the telescope was about 4.3 cm^{2} (0.67 sq in). The look direction of the telescope was identical to the symmetry axis of the spacecraft. For a beam incident parallel to the look direction of the telescope, the detection efficiency fell to 0 at 15° from this direction. The energy thresholds for each detector were as follows: (1) scintillation plastic (upper portion), electrons -350 keV, protons -3.5 MeV, (2) scintillation plastic (lower portion), electrons -400 keV, protons -35 MeV, (3) crystal sandwich, electrons -400 keV, protons -75 MeV, and (4) Cherenkov, electrons -15 MeV, protons -350 MeV. The accumulation time for the charged particle data was approximately 30 seconds. A single scaling circuit in Explorer 11 permitted one channel at a time to be monitored. During the 7 months in which the instrument was turned on and working in orbit, only 141 hours (3%) were considered useful observing time. During this time, the telescope was monitored for gamma rays and charged particles.

=== Phoswich-Cherenkov Counter Telescope ===
This experiment was designed to search for high-energy gamma rays (greater than 50 MeV) from the celestial sphere. The basic detector scheme consisted of a sandwich of NaI and CsI scintillating crystals (20 g/cm^{2}), viewed by a single photomultiplier, and a Lucite Cherenkov counter, viewed by two photomultipliers. It was completely surrounded by a shield of scintillating plastic viewed by five photomultipliers. The sandwich detector provided high-atomic-number material for the pair production process, i.e., energetic gamma rays were converted into electron-positron pairs. The electrons and positrons then entered the Cherenkov counter, which detected particles traversing its volume in only the downward sense. The simultaneous electric signals from its two PMTs indicated that one or more charged particles had traversed the telescope. The signals or lack of signals from the surrounding plastic shield at the instant the telescope had been triggered indicated whether the triggering was caused by an uncharged or charged particle. Also, the "last" and "total" components of the signals from the photomultiplier that viewed the sandwich detector afforded a method of distinguishing neutron and gamma-ray induced events. The experiment performed normally from launch until 17 November 1961.

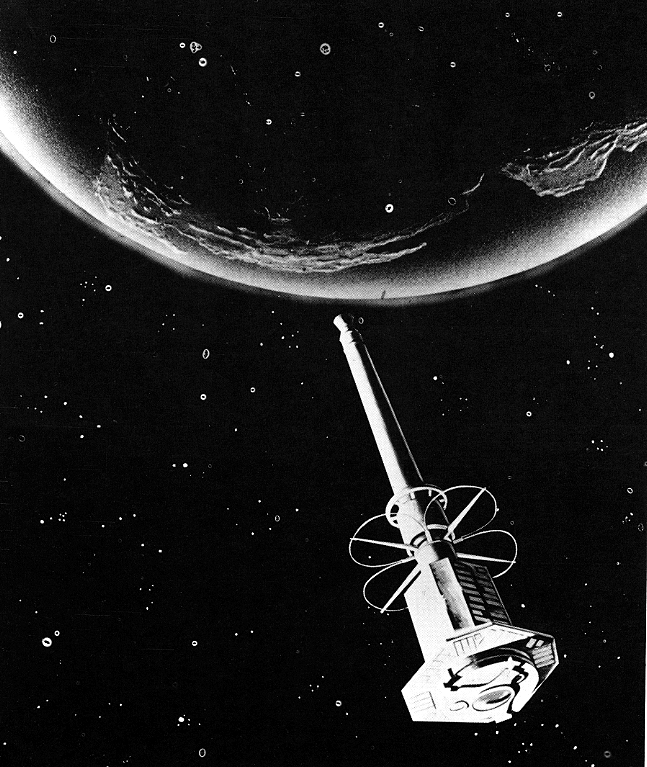
Explorer 11 in orbit

The Explorer 11 telescope, developed at Massachusetts Institute of Technology (MIT), used a combination of a sandwich scintillator detector along with a Cherenkov counter to measure the arrival directions and energies of high-energy gamma rays. Since the telescope could not be aimed, the spacecraft was set in a slow spin to scan the celestial sphere. Due to a higher than planned orbit that carried the spacecraft into the detector-jamming radiation of the Van Allen radiation belt, and an early failure of the on-board tape recorder, only 141 hours of useful observing time could be culled from about 7 months during which the instrument operated. During this time thirty-one "gamma-ray signature" events were recorded when the telescope was pointing in directions well away from the atmosphere of Earth, which is a relatively bright source of gamma rays produced in interactions of ordinary cosmic ray protons with air atoms. The celestial distribution of the thirty-one arrival directions showed no statistically significant correlation with the direction of any potential cosmic source. Lacking such a correlation, the identification of the cause of the thirty-one events as gamma rays of cosmic origin could not be established. The results of the experiment were therefore reported as upper limits that were significantly lower than the limits obtained from previous balloon-borne experiments.

An improved gamma-ray telescope, also developed at MIT, was flown on the Orbiting Solar Observatory 3 (OSO 3), which was launched in 1967. It achieved the first definitive observation of high-energy cosmic gamma rays from both galactic and extragalactic sources. Later experiments, both in orbit and on the ground, have identified numerous discrete sources of cosmic gamma rays in our galaxy and beyond.

== See also ==
- Explorer program
