= Juno II =

American rocket used for space program

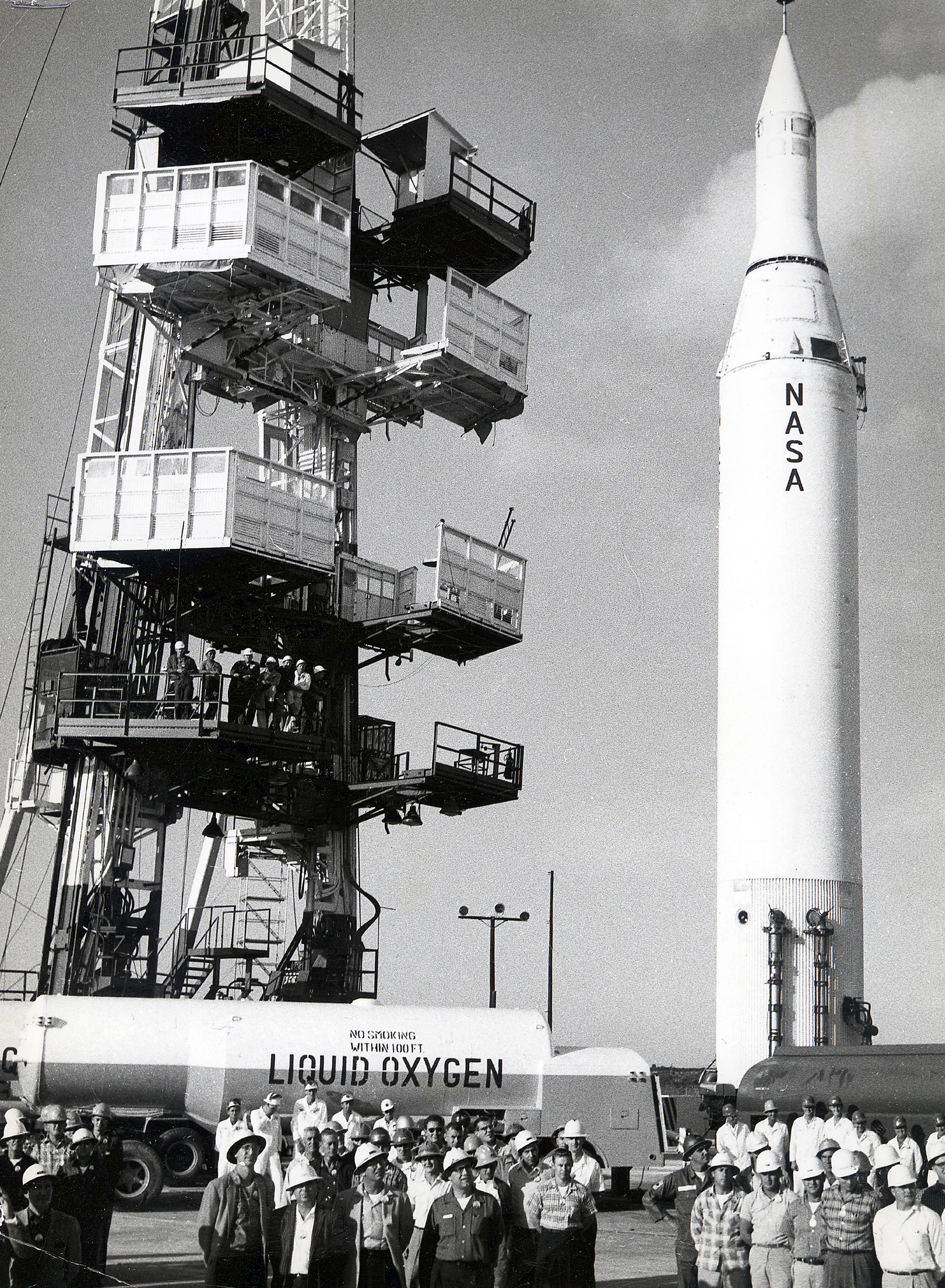
- Juno II on pad
- Function: Expendable launch system
- Manufacturer: Chrysler for ABMA
- Country of origin: United States
- Cost per launch: US$2.9 million (1958), US$31.5 million (2024)

Size
- Height: 24.0 m (78.7 ft)
- Diameter: 2.67 m (8 ft 9 in)
- Mass: 55,110 kg (121,500 lb)
- Stages: 3-4

Capacity

Payload to Low Earth orbit
- Mass: 41 kg (90 lb)

Payload to Sub-orbital TLI
- Mass: 6 kg (13 lb)

Associated rockets
- Family: Jupiter

Launch history
- Status: Retired
- Launch sites: LC-5 and LC-26B, CCAFS
- Total launches: 10
- Success(es): 4
- Failure: 5
- Partial failure: 1
- First flight: 6 December 1958
- Last flight: 24 May 1961

First stage - Jupiter
- Engines: 1x Rocketdyne S-3D
- Thrust: 667 kN (150,000 lb_{f})
- Specific impulse: 248 seconds
- Burn time: 182 seconds
- Propellant: RP-1 / LOX

Second stage MGM-29 Sergeant
- Engines: 11 Solid
- Thrust: 74.8 kN (16,800 lb_{f})
- Specific impulse: 220 seconds
- Burn time: 6 seconds
- Propellant: Solid - Polysulfide-aluminum and ammonium perchlorate

Third stage - MGM-29 Sergeant
- Engines: 3 Solid
- Thrust: 20.4 kN (4,600 lb_{f})
- Specific impulse: 236 seconds
- Burn time: 6 seconds
- Propellant: Solid - Polysulfide-aluminum and ammonium perchlorate

Fourth stage - MGM-29 Sergeant
- Engines: 1 Solid
- Thrust: 6.8 kN (1,500 lb_{f})
- Specific impulse: 249 seconds
- Burn time: 6 seconds
- Propellant: Solid - Polysulfide-aluminum and ammonium perchlorate

Juno II is an American space launch vehicle that used during the late 1950s and early 1960s. It was derived from the Jupiter missile, which was used as the first stage.

== Development ==
Solid-fueled rocket motors derived from the MGM-29 Sergeant were used as upper stages: eleven for the second stage, three for the third stage, and one for the fourth stage, the same configuration as used for the upper stages of the smaller Juno I launch vehicle. On some launches to low Earth orbit the fourth stage was not flown, allowing the launch vehicle to carry an additional nine kilograms of payload. Development of the Juno II was extremely fast due to being completely built from existing hardware. The project began in early 1958, and the first vehicle flew at the end of the year. Chrysler was responsible for the overall contract, while Rocketdyne handled the first stage propulsion and Jet Propulsion Laboratory handled the upper stage propulsion. The first three Juno IIs were converted Jupiter missiles, however all remaining boosters were built as Juno IIs from the beginning.

The main differences between the Juno II and Jupiter were stretched propellant tanks for increased burn time (the first stage burn time was approximately 20 seconds longer than on the Jupiter), a reinforced structure to support the added weight of upper stages, and the inertial guidance system replaced with a radio ground guidance package, which was moved to the upper stages.

== History ==
The Juno II was used for ten satellite launches, of which six failed. It launched Pioneer 3, Pioneer 4, Explorer 7, Explorer 8, and Explorer 11 from Cape Canaveral Launch Complex 5 and Launch Complex 26B.

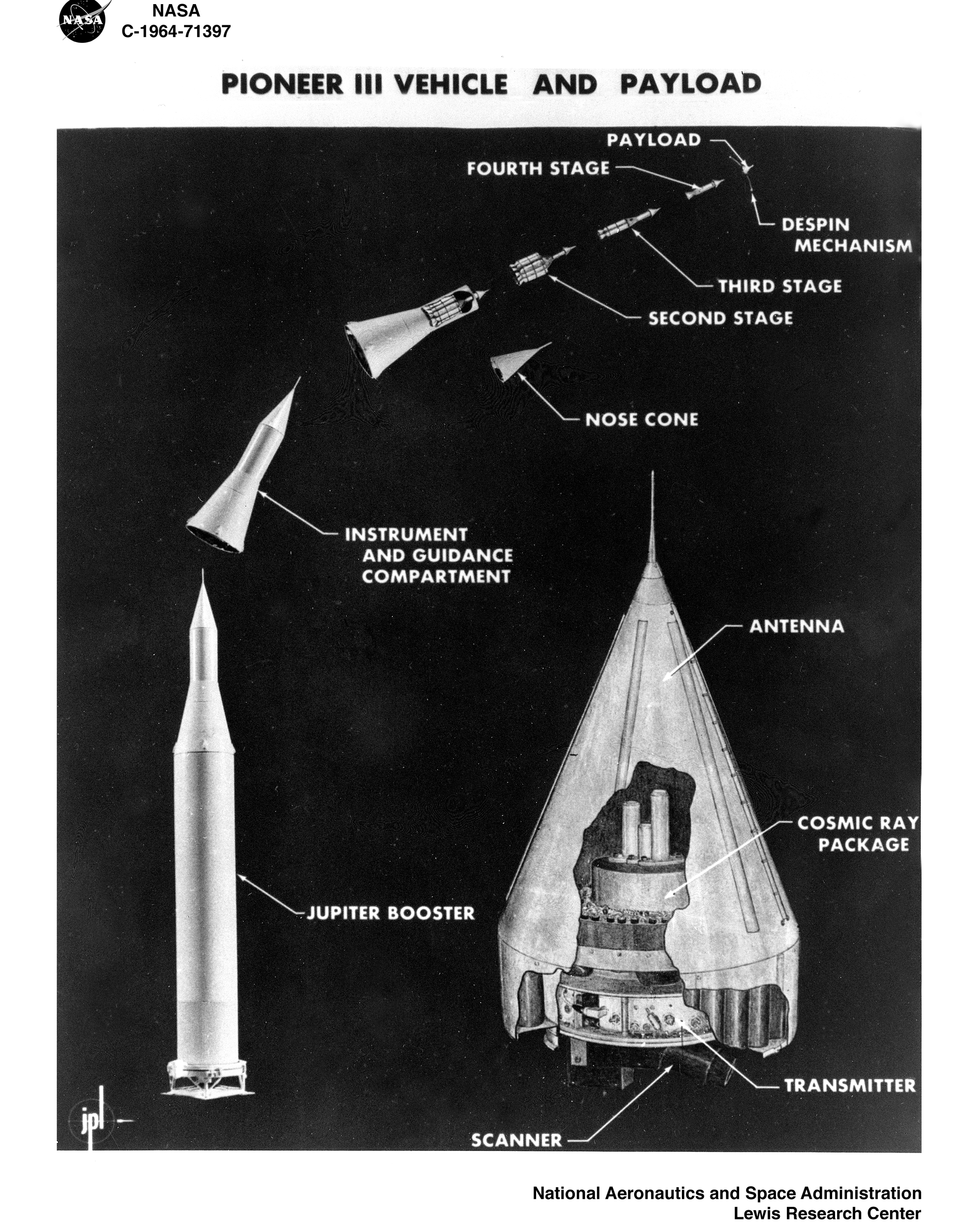
Juno II with Pioneer 3 payload

The first launch of a Juno II, Pioneer 3 on 6 December 1958, suffered a premature first-stage cutoff, preventing the upper stages from achieving sufficient velocity to fly past the Moon. Pioneer 3 could not escape Earth orbit, but transmitted data for some 40 hours before reentering the atmosphere. A malfunction in a propellant depletion circuit was found to be the cause of the failure, although the exact nature of it could not be determined. The circuit was redesigned afterwards.

Pioneer 4 launched successfully on 3 March 1959, making for the only first-generation U.S. lunar probe to accomplish all of its mission goals, as well as the sole successful U.S. lunar probe until 1964. After Pioneer 4, NASA shifted their lunar efforts to the bigger Atlas-Able booster and decided instead to utilize the Juno II for Earth orbital launches. By removing the fourth stage, the payload capacity was nearly doubled.

The attempted launch of Explorer S1 on 16 July 1959 failed dramatically when the Juno II lost control almost immediately at liftoff, performing a cartwheel before the range safety officer sent the destruct command. The almost fully fueled booster crashed a few hundred feet from the pad, blockhouse crews watching in stunned surprise at the upper stage motors burning on the ground. Cause of the mishap was quickly traced to a short between two diodes in a power inverter, which cut off power to the guidance system at liftoff and caused the Juno's engine to gimbal to full stop, flipping the vehicle onto its side before Range Safety action was taken. To prevent a recurrence of this failure mode, improved coatings were used on the circuit boards in the booster.

On 15 August 1959, the next Juno II was flown, carrying the Beacon satellite. While first-stage performance was nominal, the upper stages malfunctioned. One intended experiment on this mission was the ejection of four flares stowed in the interstage section, which would be tracked and photographed during the launch. However, things went awry when the flare ejection failed to take place on schedule. The control system also malfunctioned and drove the upper stages into the Atlantic Ocean instead of orbit. It was concluded that one of the flares deployed inside the interstage section instead of outside like it was intended to, causing the guidance compartment to depressurize and cause loss of vehicle control.

Explorer 7 was scheduled for launch in the last week of September 1959, but a Jupiter missile test on an adjacent pad failed just after liftoff on 15 September 1959 and the Juno II suffered minor damage from flying debris. This was quickly repaired, and the launch performed successfully on 13 October 1959. Explorer 7 would be the last Juno II launch from LC-5 as the pad was then permanently reassigned to Project Mercury.

On 23 March 1960, another Explorer satellite failed to reach orbit when one second-stage motor failed to ignite, causing imbalanced thrust that sent the payload into the Atlantic Ocean.

In mid-1960, with only two successful launches in six attempts, a NASA board conducted a thorough reevaluation of the Juno II as a launch vehicle. The failures were mostly traced to isolated component failures that occurred as a result of inadequate testing and checkouts. This was blamed on the program being close-ended, with no further plans for development of the booster, leading to low interest and apathy among those in the program. The Jet Propulsion Laboratory team who developed the Juno II had originally only intended it for the Pioneer lunar probes and their interest started waning as soon as NASA began Earth orbital launches with the vehicle. Even worse, most of the design team had been disbanded and its members reassigned to other projects, making it difficult to obtain technical information for the Juno II. The conversion of the booster for LEO launches also threw off the calibration of the spinning tub third stage which was designed for the tiny Pioneer probes and not the larger Explorer satellites.

At this time, NASA had four Juno IIs remaining in their inventory. The review board predicted that two of them would launch successfully, but recommended that there was no reason not to fly the boosters since they had already been bought and paid for. Their assumptions proved correct.

Explorer 8 was launched successfully on 3 November 1960, with the next attempt on 24 February 1961 a failure. A control cable came loose during ascent and wrapped itself around the spinning third-stage tub, damaging the upper stages and payload. Second-stage ignition occurred on time, but the third stage did not ignite, and the satellite failed to reach orbit. Explorer 11 launched successfully on 27 April 1961, an event that raised NASA's morale during a mostly disastrous month characterized by Project Mercury failures and the Soviet launch of a man into space. On 24 May 1961, the final Juno II lifted from LC-26A carrying another ionospheric beacon satellite. The instrument unit lost power following first-stage separation, resulting in no second-stage ignition and the payload falling into the ocean instead of reaching orbit. By this time however, the fast-rising Thor-Delta and Agena vehicles were on their way to take over as mainstays of the U.S. light and medium-lift launch vehicle arsenal.

=== Launch history ===
Juno II was launched ten times by NASA, with the first launch being joint with ABMA.

| Launch | Flight No. | Date / time (GMT) | Launch site | Payload | Payload mass | Orbit | Launch outcome | Comments |
|---|---|---|---|---|---|---|---|---|
| 1 | AM-11 | 6 December 1958; 05:44 | LC-5 | Pioneer 3 | 6 kg | High sub-orbit | Partial failure | Maiden launch of Juno II. 4 stages. Lunar probe. Premature first stage cutoff due to propellant depletion circuit malfunction. |
| 2 | AM-14 | 3 March 1959; 05:10 | LC-5 | Pioneer 4 | 6 kg | Heliocentric orbit | Success | Lunar probe. |
| 3 | AM-16 | 16 July 1959; 17:37 | LC-5 | Explorer S-1 | 42 kg | Low Earth orbit | Failure | A shorted diode caused loss of power to the guidance system and almost immediate control failure at liftoff. Destroyed by RSO at T+5 seconds. |
| 4 | AM-19B | 15 August 1959; 00:31 | LC-26B | Beacon 2 | | | Failure | Guidance compartment depressurized at T+203 seconds, leading to control failure. |
| 5 | AM-19A | 13 October 1959; 15:30 | LC-5 | Explorer 7 | 42 kg | Low Earth orbit | Success | |
| 6 | AM-19C | 23 March 1960; 13:35 | LC-26B | Explorer S-46 | 41 kg | | Failure | One second stage motor failed to ignite, resulting in imbalanced thrust and inability to reach orbital velocity. |
| 7 | AM-19D | 3 November 1960; 05:23 | LC-26B | Explorer 8 | 41 kg | Low Earth orbit | Success | |
| 8 | AM-19F | 25 February 1961; 00:13 | LC-26B | Explorer S-45 | | | Failure | Third stage damage during ascent prevented ignition. |
| 9 | AM-19E | 27 April 1961; 14:16 | LC-26B | Explorer 11 | 37 kg | Low Earth orbit | Success | |
| 10 | AM-19G | 24 May 1961; 19:48 | LC-26B | Explorer S-45A | | | Failure | Instrument unit power failure. Second stage ignition did not occur. |

== Specifications ==
Juno II had the following specifications:

- Total length: 24.0 m
- Orbit payload to 200 km: 41 kg
- Escape velocity payload: 6 kg
- First launch date: 6 December 1958
- Last launch date: 24 May 1961

| Parameter | 1st stage | 2nd stage | 3rd stage | 4th stage |
|---|---|---|---|---|
| Gross mass | 54,431 kg | 462 kg | 126 kg | 42 kg |
| Empty mass | 5,443 kg | 231 kg | 63 kg | 21 kg |
| Thrust | 667 kN | 74.8 kN | 20 kN | 6.8 kN |
| Isp | 248 s (2.43 kN·s/kg) | 220 s (2.16 kN·s/kg) | 236 s (2.31 kN·s/kg) | 249 s (2.44 kN·s/kg) |
| Burn time | 182 s | 6 s | 6 s | 6 s |
| Length | 18.28 m | 1.0 m | 1.0 m | 1.0 m |
| Diameter | 2.67 m | 1.0 m | 0.50 m | 0.30 m |
| Engine: | Rocketdyne S-3D | 11 x Baby Sergeant | 3 x Baby Sergeant | Baby Sergeant |
| Propellant | LOX/RP-1 | Solid Fuel | Solid Fuel | Solid Fuel |

== Gallery ==
Juno II launches

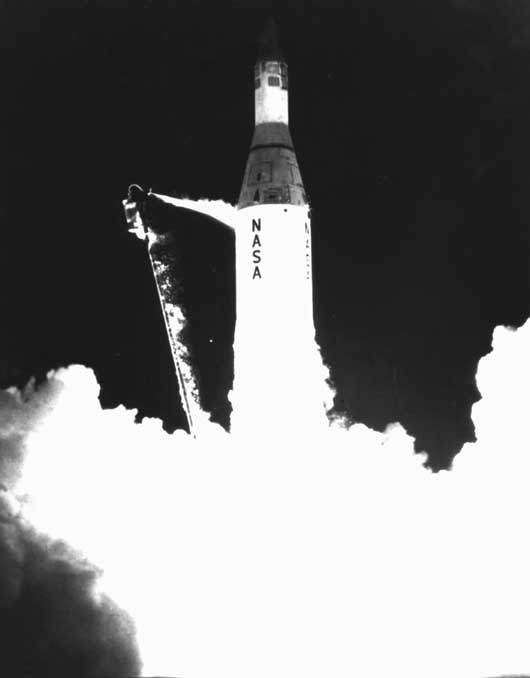
Launch 1, Juno II AM-11 with Pioneer 3

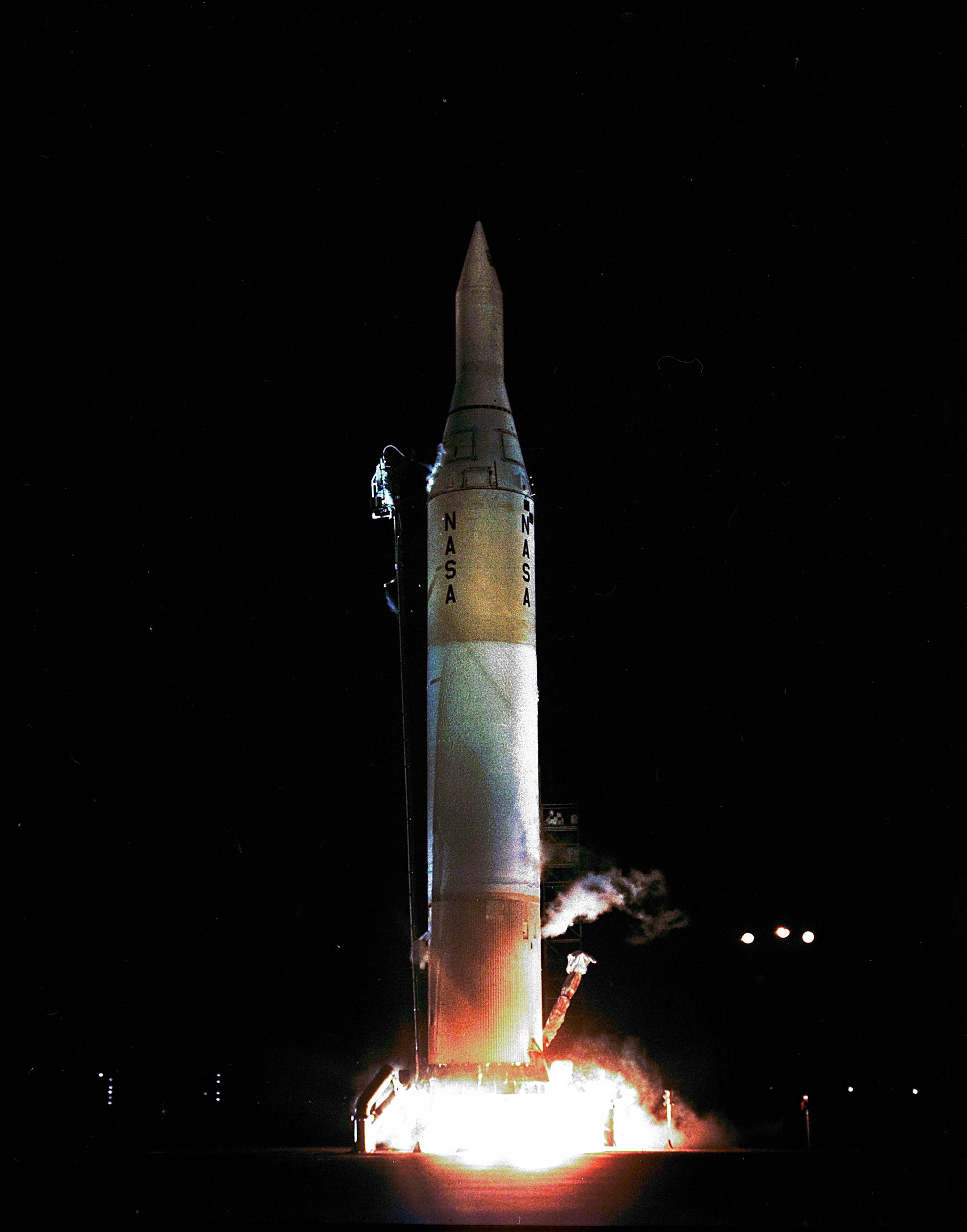
Launch 2, Juno II AM-14 with Pioneer 4

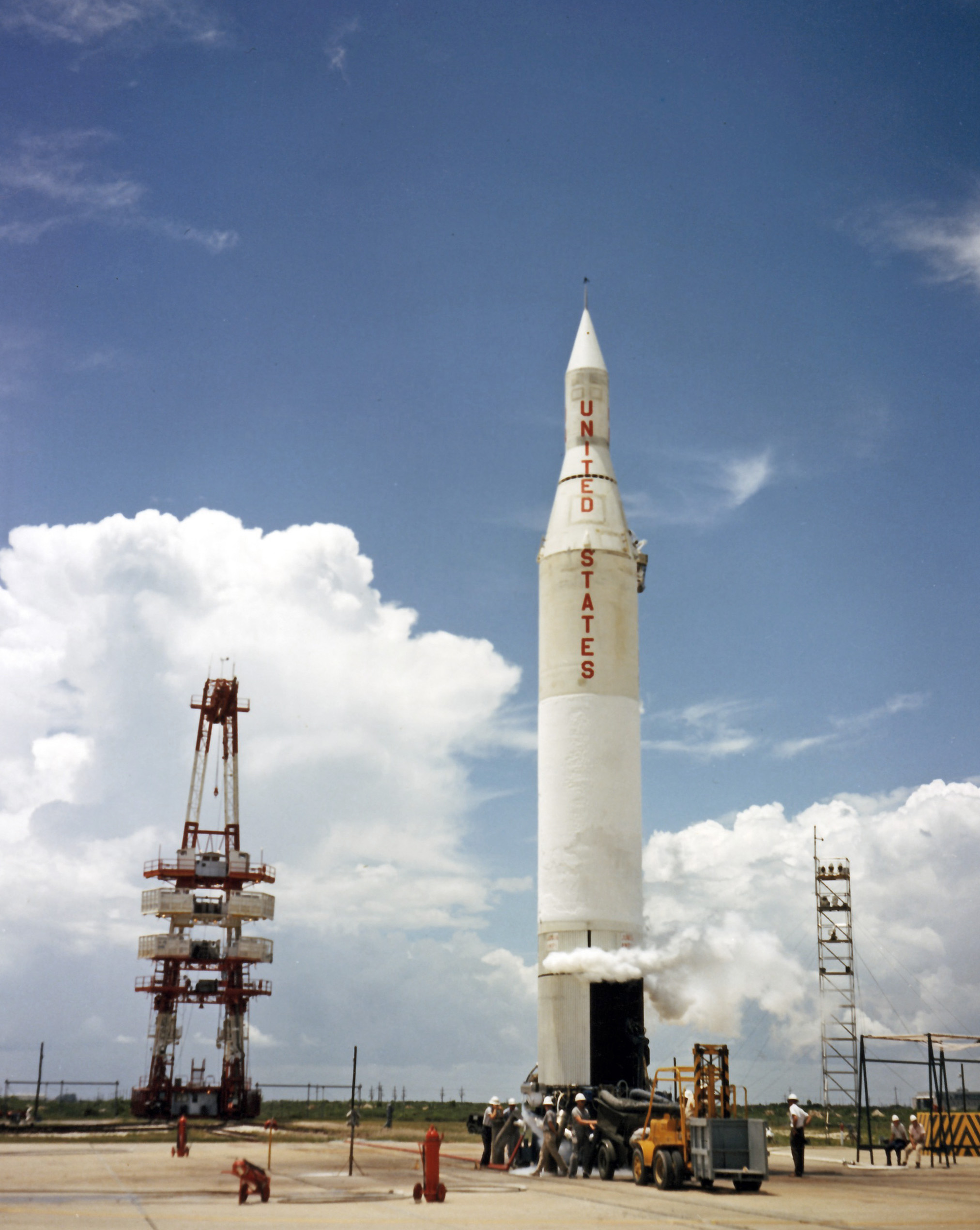
Launch 3, Juno II AM-16 with Explorer S-1

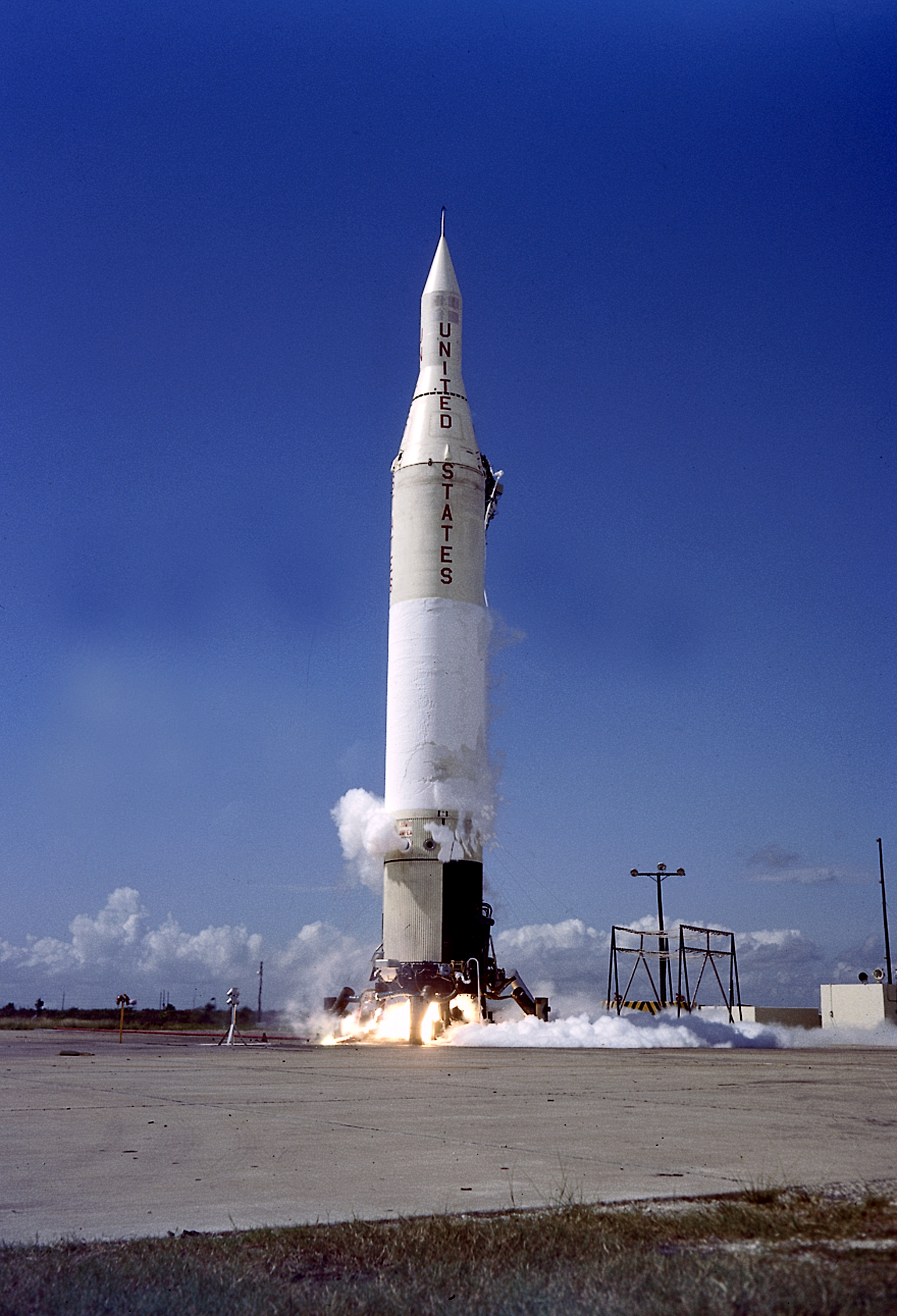
Launch 5, Juno II AM-19A with Explorer 7

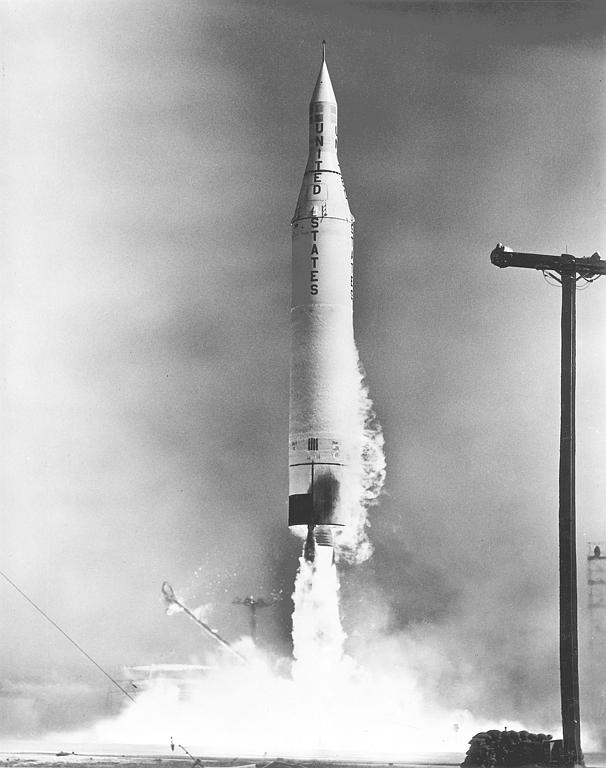
Launch 9, Juno II AM-19E with Explorer 11
Juno II on display

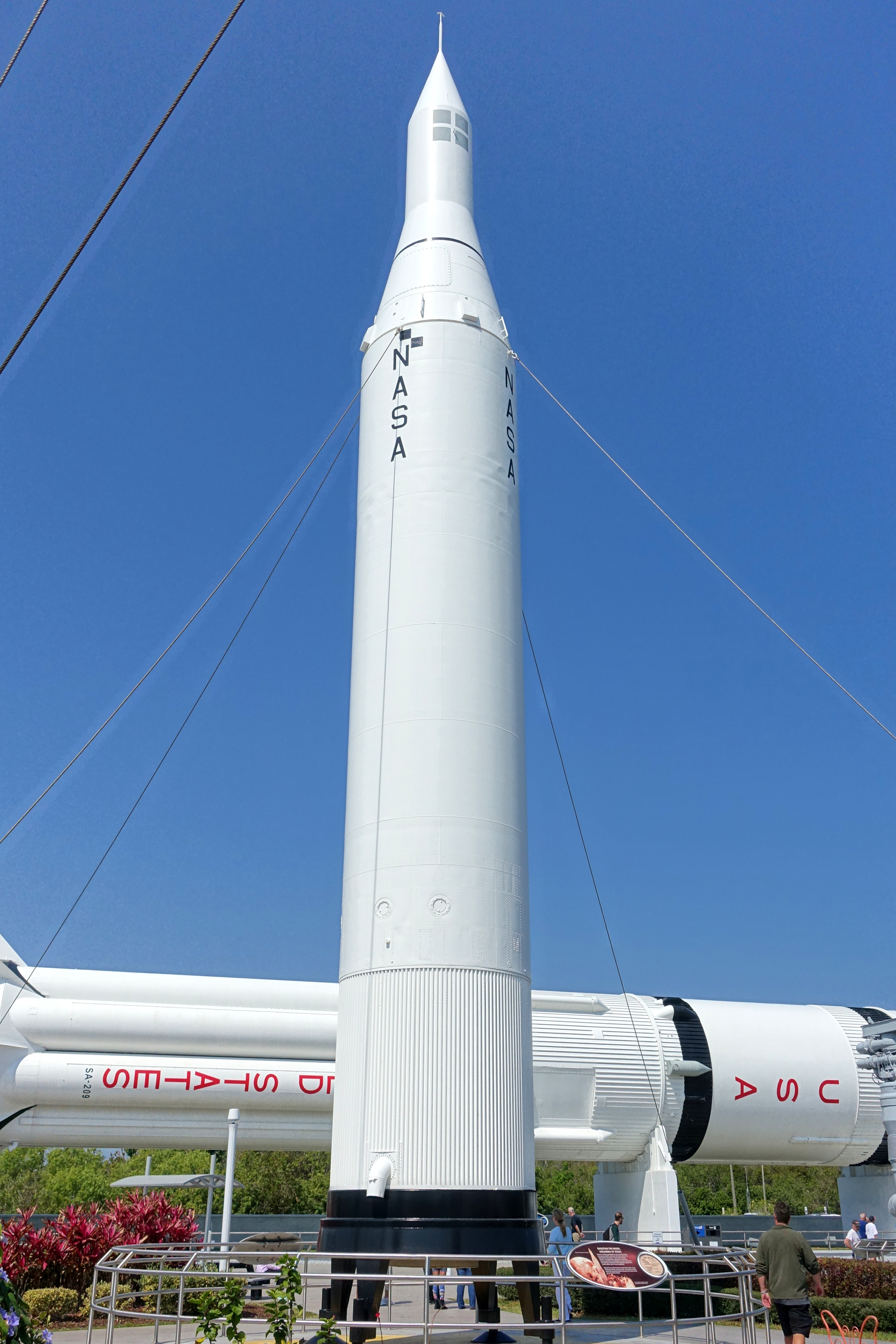
Juno II at KSC rocket Garden

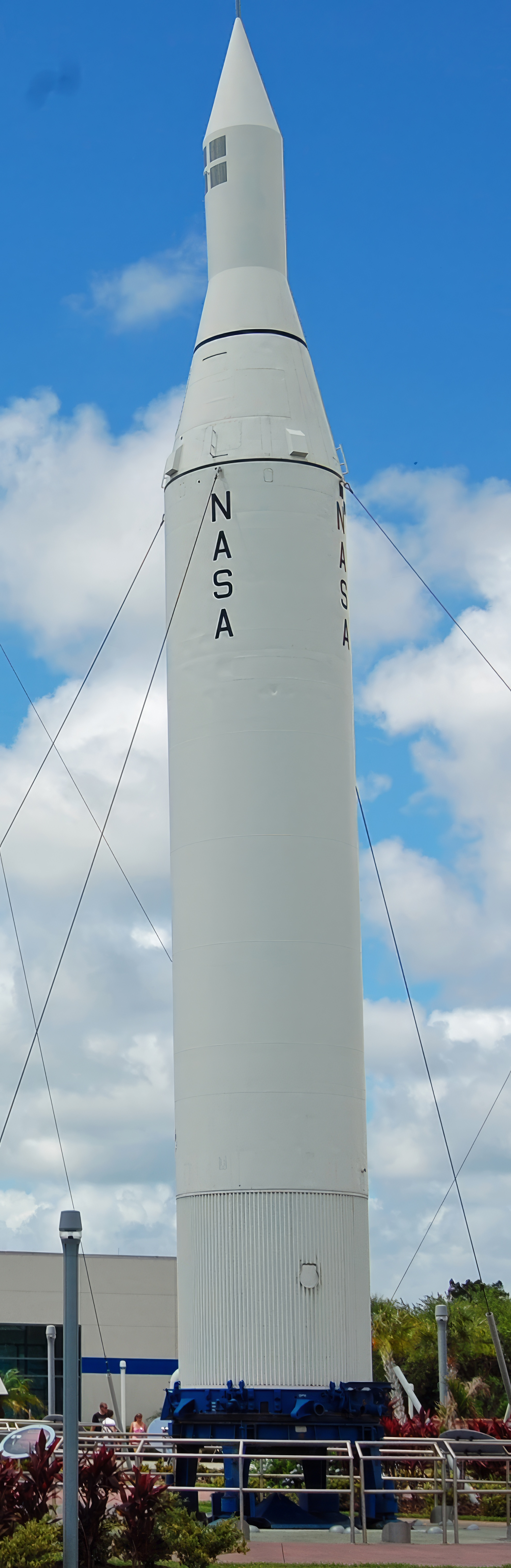
Juno II at KSC rocket Garden

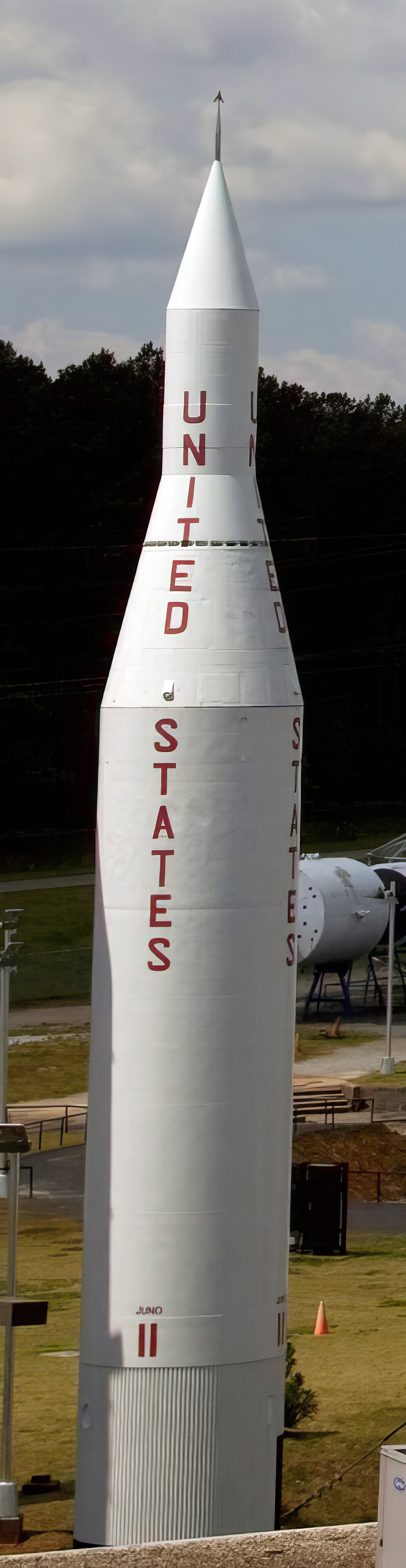
Juno II at US Space & Rocket Center

== See also ==
- Juno I
- PGM-19 Jupiter
