= Pioneer 4 =

First successful NASA mission to the Moon (1959)

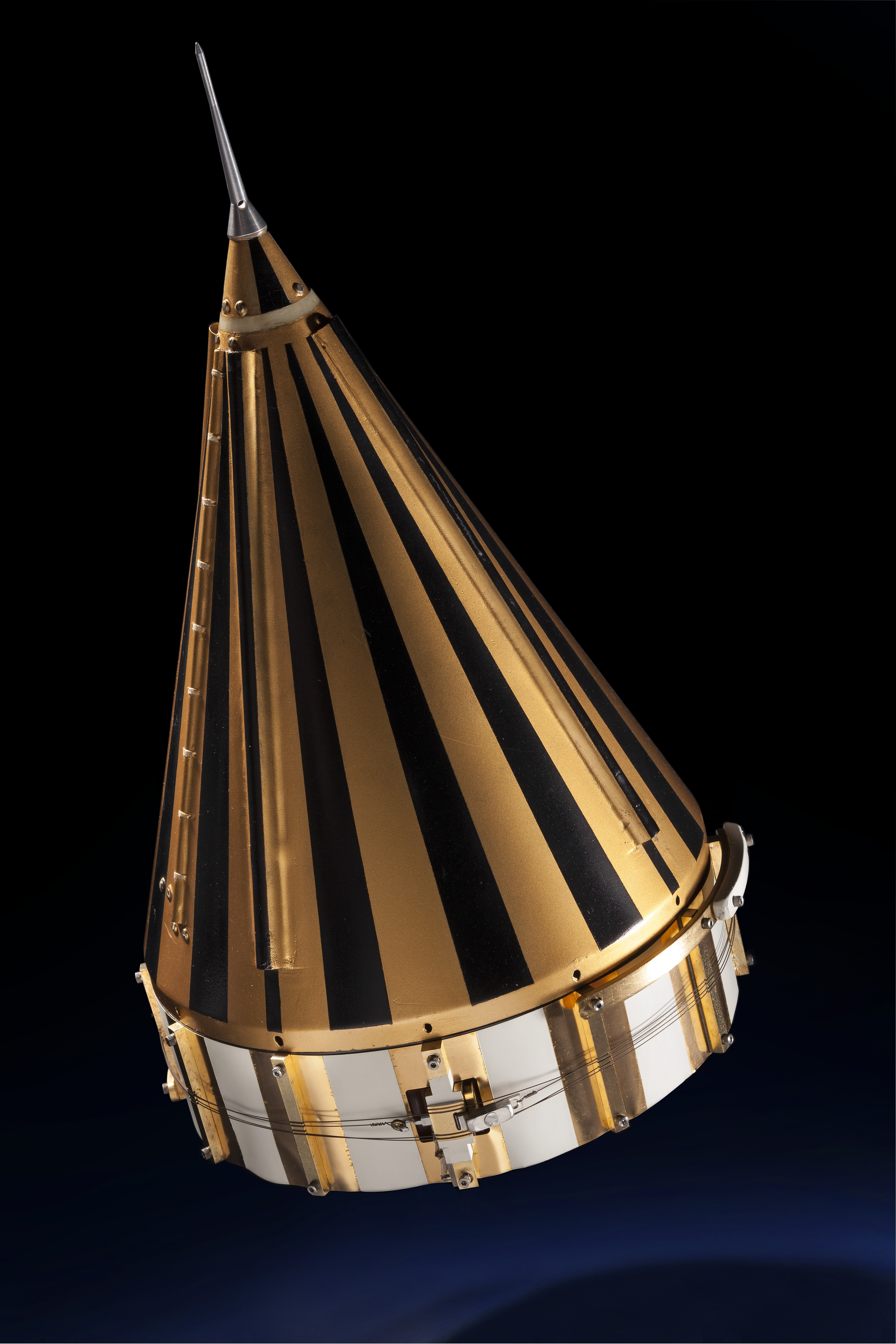
- Pioneer 4 flight spare
- Mission type: Lunar flyby
- Operator: NASA
- Harvard designation: 1959 Nu 1
- COSPAR ID: 1959-013A
- SATCAT no.: 113
- Mission duration: 3 days, 10 hours and 29 minutes

Spacecraft properties
- Manufacturer: Jet Propulsion Laboratory
- Launch mass: 6.08 kg

Start of mission
- Launch date: 3 March 1959, 05:10:56 GMT
- Rocket: Juno II
- Launch site: Cape Canaveral, LC-5
- Contractor: Chrysler

End of mission
- Last contact: 6 March 1959, 15:40:00 GMT

Orbital parameters
- Reference system: Heliocentric
- Semi-major axis: 1.1015 AU
- Eccentricity: 0.07109
- Perihelion altitude: 0.98 AU
- Aphelion altitude: 1.13 AU
- Inclination: 1.5°
- Period: 398.0 days
- Epoch: 3 March 1959

Flyby of Moon
- Closest approach: 4 March 1959, 22:25 GMT
- Distance: 58,983 kilometres (36,650 mi)

Pioneer 4 is an American spin-stabilized uncrewed spacecraft that was launched as part of the Pioneer program on a lunar flyby trajectory and into a heliocentric orbit, making it the first probe of the United States to escape from the Earth's gravity. Launched on March 3, 1959, it carried a payload similar to Pioneer 3: a lunar radiation environment experiment using a Geiger–Müller tube detector and a lunar photography experiment. It passed within 58,983 km (36,650 mi) of the Moon's surface. However, Pioneer 4 did not come close enough to trigger its photoelectric sensor. The spacecraft was still in solar orbit as of 1969. It was the only successful lunar probe launched by the U.S. in 12 attempts between 1958 and 1963; only in 1964 would Ranger 7 surpass its success by accomplishing all of its mission objectives.

After the Soviet Luna 1 probe conducted the first successful flyby of the Moon on 3 January 1959, the pressure felt by the US to succeed with a lunar mission was enormous, especially since American mission failures were entirely public while the Soviet failures were kept a secret.

== Spacecraft design ==
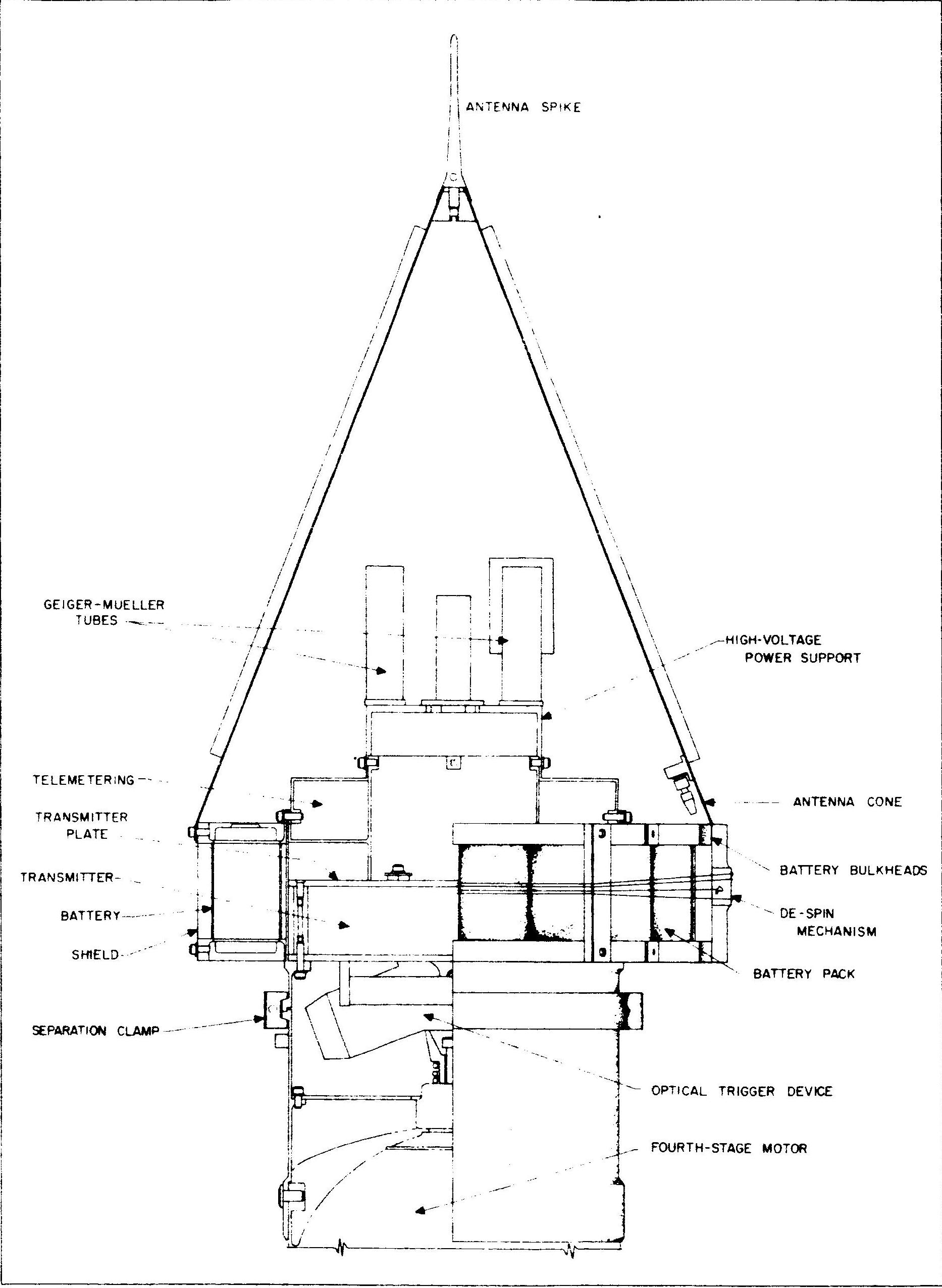
Diagram of Pioneer 4

Pioneer 4 was a cone-shaped probe 51 cm high and 23 cm in diameter at its base. The cone was composed of a thin fiberglass shell coated with a gold wash to make it electrically conducting and painted with white stripes to maintain the temperature between 10 and 50 °C. At the tip of the cone was a small probe which combined with the cone itself to act as an antenna. At the base of the cone, a ring of mercury batteries provided power. A photoelectric sensor protruded from the center of the ring. The sensor was designed with two photocells which would be triggered by the light of the Moon when the probe was within about 30,000 km of the Moon. At the center of the cone was a voltage supply tube and two Geiger–Müller tubes. The Laboratory's Microlock system, used for communicating with earlier Explorer satellites, did not have sufficient range to perform this mission. Therefore, a new radio system called TRAC(E) Tracking And Communication (Extraterrestrial) was designed. TRAC(E) was an integral part of the Goldstone Deep Space Communications Complex. A transmitter with a mass of 0.5 kg delivered a phase modulated signal of 0.1 W at a frequency of 960.05 MHz. The modulated carrier power was 0.08 W and the total effective radiated power 0.18 W. A despin mechanism consisted of two 7 gram weights which spooled out to the end of two 150 cm wires when triggered by a hydraulic timer 10 hours after launch. The weights were designed to slow the spacecraft spin from 400 rpm to 6 rpm, and then weights and wires were released. Pioneer 4 received a few small modifications over its predecessor, namely added lead shielding around the Geiger tubes and modifications to the telemetry system to improve its reliability and signal strength. The probe had S/N #4, with probe #3 recalled from launch due to technical issues.

== Launch vehicle ==
Pioneer 4 was launched with a Juno II launch vehicle, which also launched Pioneer 3. Juno II closely resembled the Juno I (Jupiter-C based) vehicle that launched Explorer 1. Its first stage was a 19.51 m elongated Jupiter IRBM missile that was used by the U.S. Army. On top of the Jupiter propulsion section was a guidance and control compartment that supported a rotating tub containing the rocket stages 2, 3 and 4. Pioneer 4 was mounted on top of stage 4.

== Mission ==
Time and Space (1959) Official NASA Pioneer 4 information film reel.

At 05:10:56 GMT on the night of 3 March 1959, Pioneer 4 lifted off from LC-5 at Cape Canaveral. This time, the booster performed almost perfectly so that Pioneer 4 achieved its primary objective (an Earth-Moon trajectory), returned radiation data and provided a valuable tracking exercise. A slightly longer than nominal second stage burn, however, was enough to induce small trajectory and velocity errors, so that the probe passed within 58,983 km of the Moon's surface (7.2° E, 5.7° S) on 4 March 1959 at 22:25 GMT (5:25 p.m. EST) at a speed of 7230 km/h. The distance was not close enough to trigger the photoelectric sensor. This scanning device was being tested for use in future probes to activate either a film or vidicon camera. The probe continued transmitting radiation data for 82.5 hours, to a distance of 658,000 kilometres (409,000 mi), and reached perihelion on 18 March 1959 at 01:00 GMT. The cylindrical fourth stage casing (173 cm long, 15 cm diameter, 4.65 kg) went into orbit with the probe. The communication system had worked well, and it was estimated that signals could have been received out to 1,000,000 kilometres (620,000 mi) had there been enough battery power.

== Gallery ==
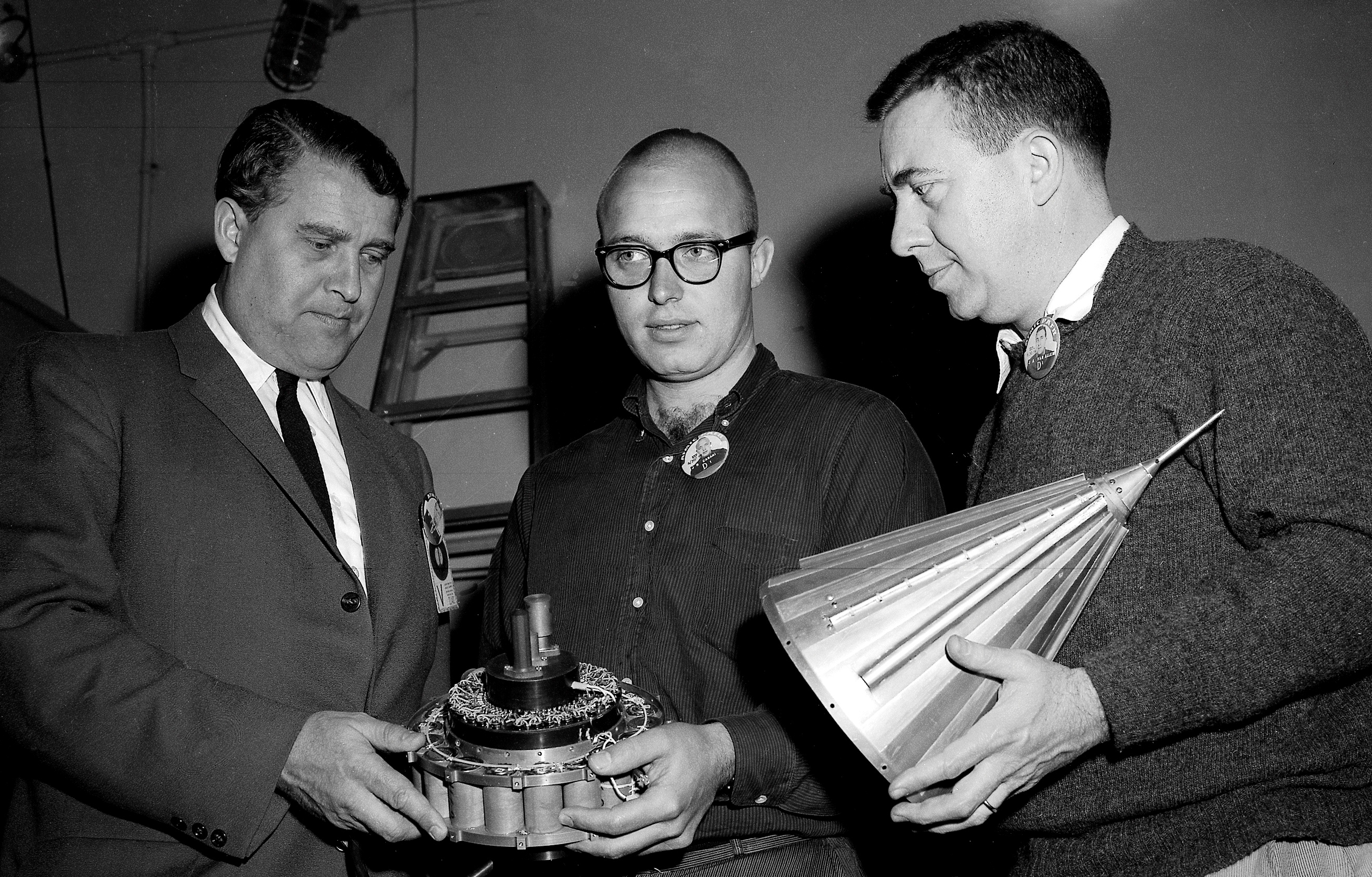
The Pioneer 4 probe is inspected by (left to right) Dr. Wernher von Braun, payload engineer John Casani and Dr. James Van Allen.

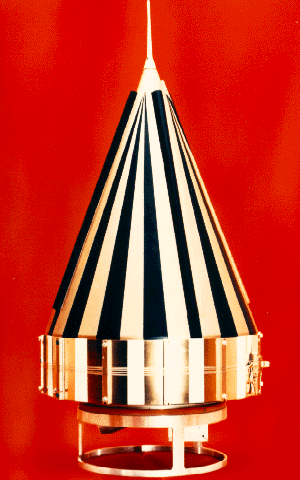
Pioneer 4

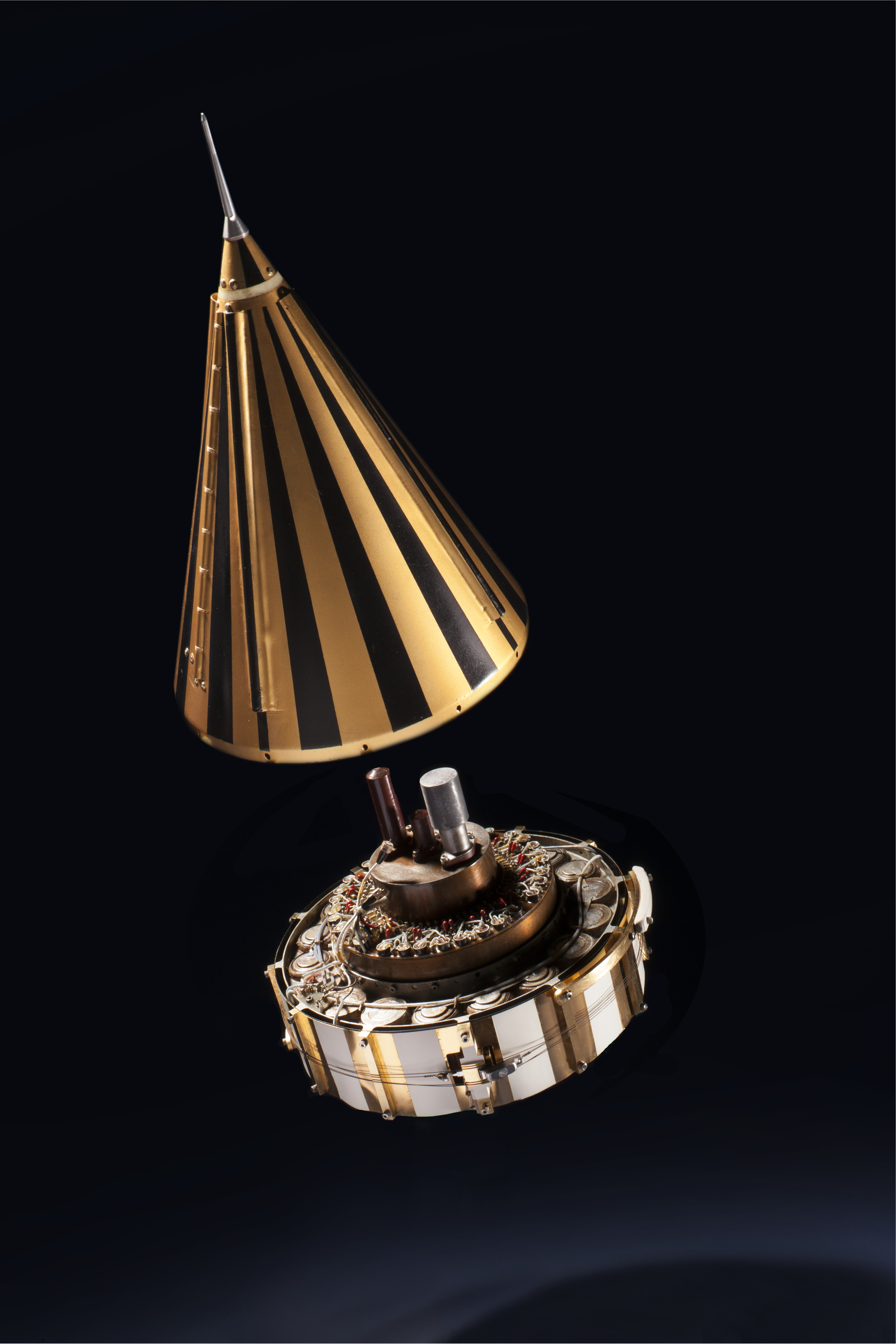
Pioneer IV flight spare

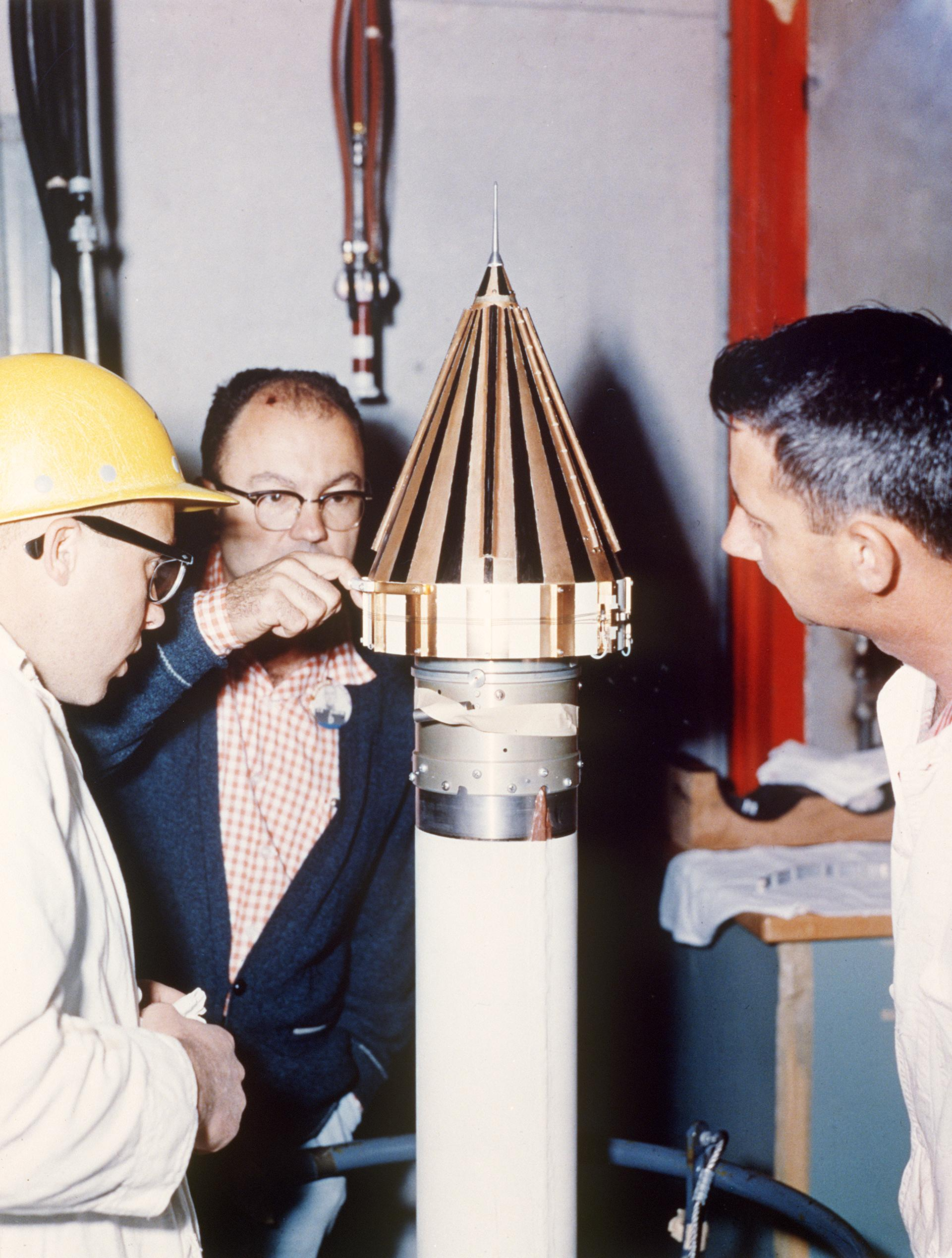
Engineers checking Pioneer 4, atop the fourth-stage motor of Juno II

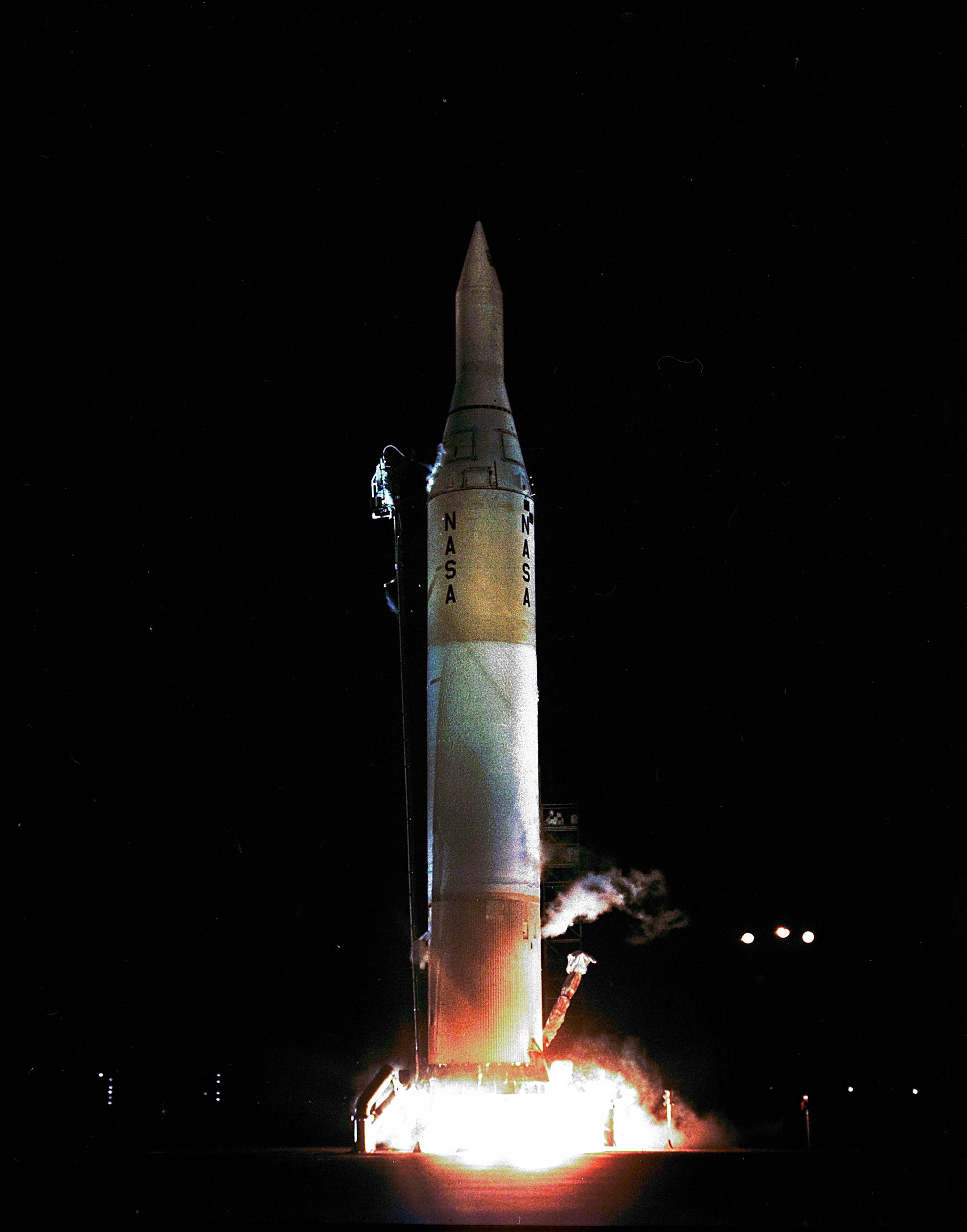
Launch of Pioneer 4

Universal newsreel about the launch

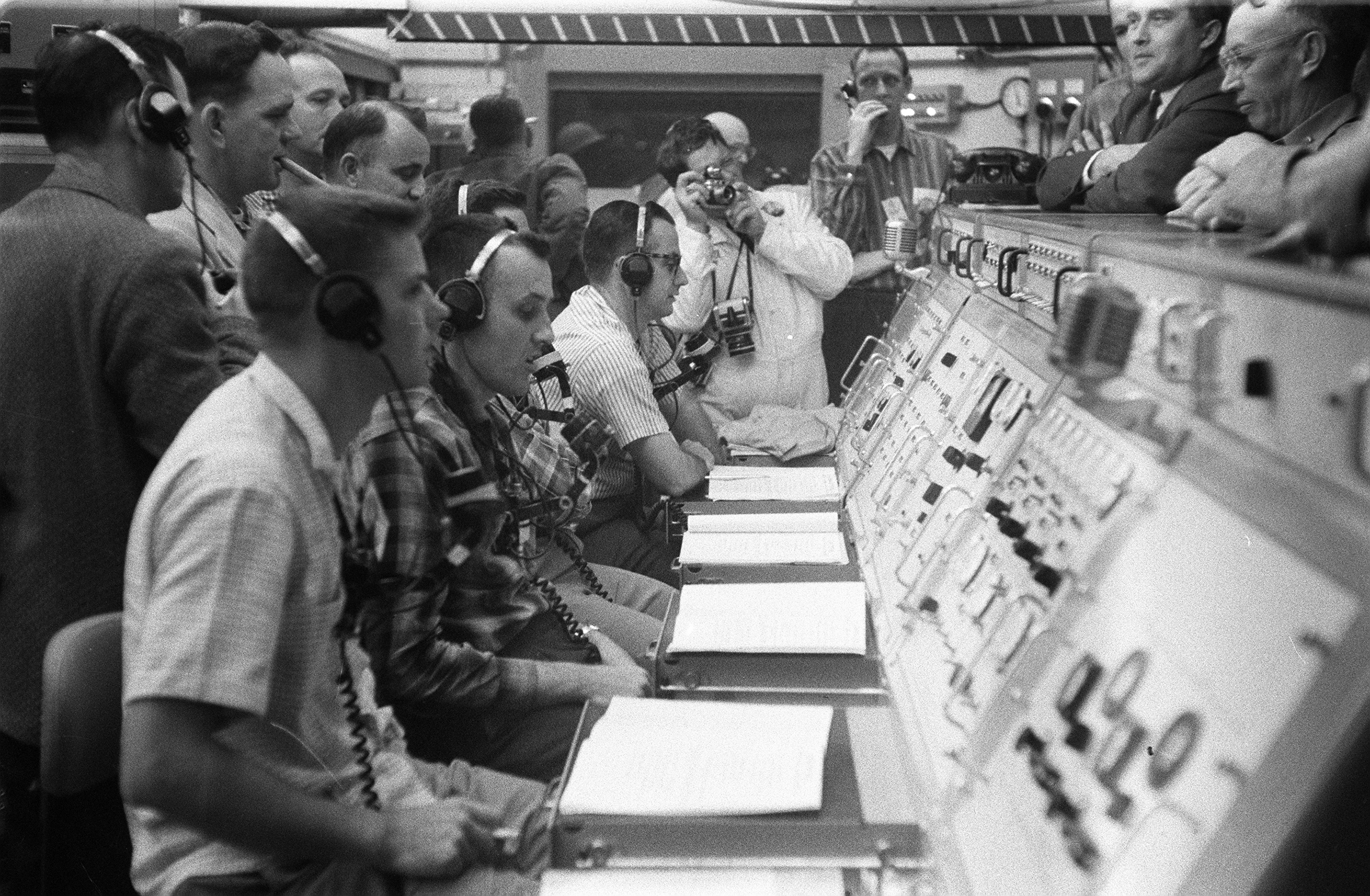
Dr. von Braun at the launch control room during the Pioneer 4 launch

== See also ==
- Luna 1 – a similar Soviet space program mission launched 2 January 1959, several weeks before Pioneer 4.
