= Explorer 8 =

NASA satellite of the Explorer program

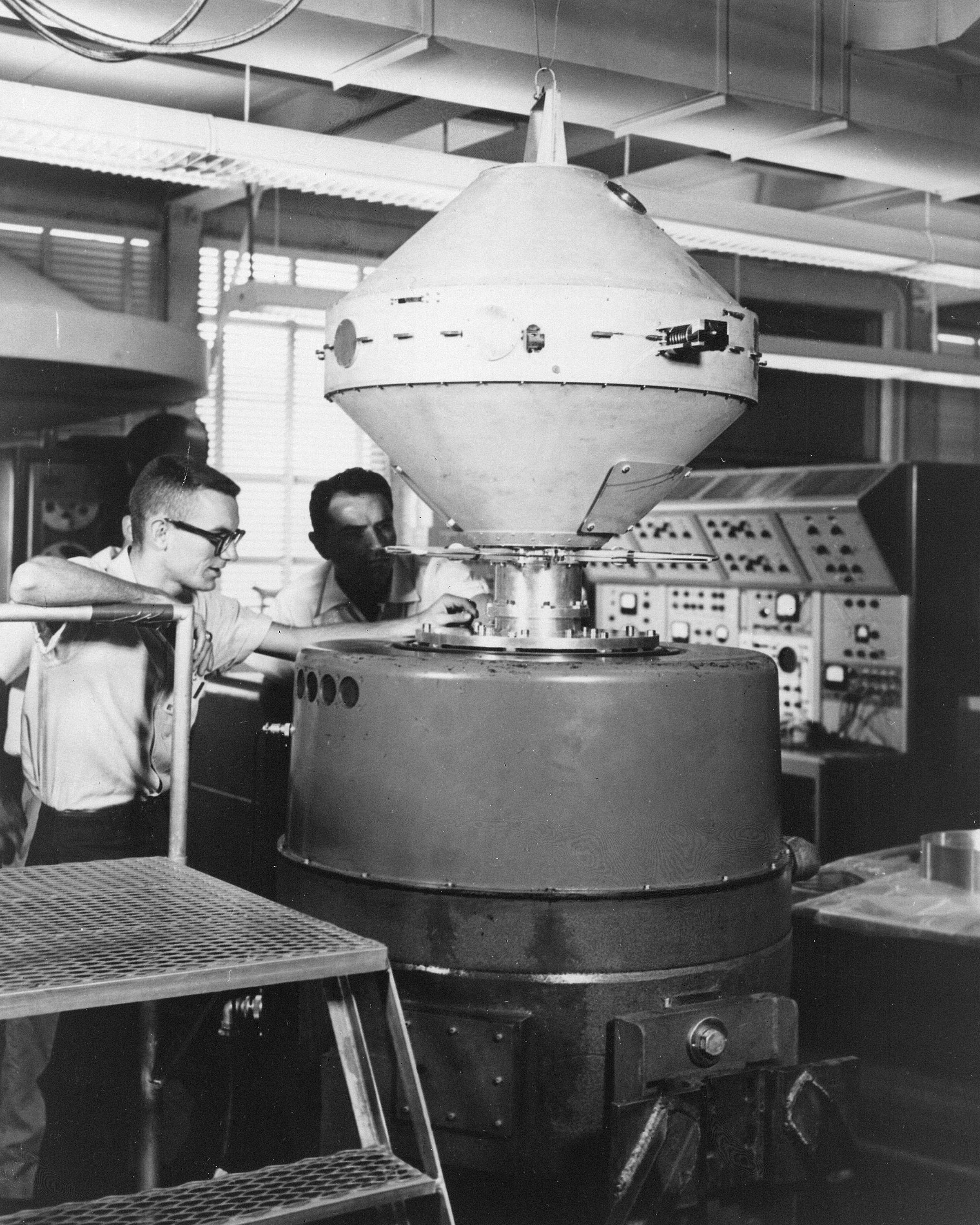
- Explorer 8 satellite
- Names: S-30; NASA-S30
- Mission type: Earth science
- Operator: NASA
- Harvard designation: 1960 Xi 1
- COSPAR ID: 1960-014A
- SATCAT no.: 00060
- Mission duration: 54 days (achieved)

Spacecraft properties
- Spacecraft: Explorer VIII
- Spacecraft type: Science Explorer
- Bus: S-30
- Manufacturer: Jet Propulsion Laboratory
- Launch mass: 40.88 kg (90.1 lb)
- Dimensions: 76 × 76 cm (30 × 30 in)
- Power: 100 watts

Start of mission
- Launch date: 3 November 1960, 05:23:10 GMT
- Rocket: Juno II (AM-19D)
- Launch site: Cape Canaveral, LC-26B
- Contractor: Army Ballistic Missile Agency
- Entered service: 3 November 1960

End of mission
- Last contact: 27 December 1960
- Decay date: 28 March 2012

Orbital parameters
- Reference system: Geocentric orbit
- Regime: Medium Earth orbit
- Perigee altitude: 416 km (258 mi)
- Apogee altitude: 2,286 km (1,420 mi)
- Inclination: 49.9°
- Period: 112.7 minutes

Instruments
- Electric Field Meter; Ion Traps; Langmuir Probe; Micrometeorite Microphone; Micrometeorite Photomultiplier; RF Impedance; Satellite Drag Atmospheric Density

Explorer 8 was a NASA research satellite launched on 3 November 1960. It was intended to study the temporal and spatial distribution of the electron density, the electron temperature, the ion concentration, the ion mass, the micrometeorite distribution, and the micrometeorite mass in the ionosphere at altitudes between 400 km (250 mi) and 1,600 km (990 mi) and their variation from full sunlit conditions to full shadow, or nighttime, conditions.

== Spacecraft ==
Explorer 8 was a 40.88 kg (90.1 lb) mercury-battery-powered satellite. The payload was in the form of two truncated cones with the bases attached to a cylindrical equator. The outer shell was aluminum and had a diameter of 76 cm (30 in) and a height of 76 cm (30 in). The 108.00 MHz transmitter had 100 mW average power, and it functioned for the life of the battery pack (54 days). The data system included telemetry consisting of continuous operation with real-time transmission. To avoid the possibility of effects on the experiments by asymmetrical charging on solar cell surfaces, solar cells were not used.

== Experiment ==
Experiment instrumentation included a radio frequency (RF) impedance probe, an ion current monitor, a retarding potential probe, a two-element and a three-element electron temperature probe, an electron current monitor, a photomultiplier-type and a microphone-type micrometeorite detector, an electric field meter, a solar horizon sensor, and thermistor temperature probes. Simultaneous measurements of electron and ion concentration were used to resolve the question of neutrality of the medium.

=== Electric Field Meter ===
A rotating-shutter-type electric field meter was mounted at the forward end of the satellite's spin axis to obtain measurements of the distribution of charges that accumulate on the satellite surface due to interaction of the satellite with the plasma sheath. The meter consisted of an exposed four-blade, motor-driven shutter (rotor), grounded to the satellite skin by brushes, and a four-blade stator, or sensor, located directly behind and having the same configuration as the rotor. The stator, which was connected to ground through a resistive load, was alternately exposed and shielded by the 7500-rpm rotor. Exposed surfaces on the meter were goldplated. Rotor-stator spacing was 3 mm. Because of the experiments large power demand (3 W), it was turned on from the ground. After 2 minutes of operation, the experiment was automatically turned off by a command program module. The total daytime potential difference between the spacecraft and environment was found to be 0.15 V when the medium's electron density was about 1.E4 electrons/cc. At apogee, where electron density was about 1.E3 electrons/cc, the potential reversed and became a few tenths of a volt positive.

=== Ion Traps ===
A series of four flush-mounted and electrically insulated planar ion traps with plane parallel grids and collectors was used to measure the total current of incident protons, electrons, other charged particles, and photoelectrons emitted from the collectors. The addition of a single grounded grid and a positively biased collector permitted the measurement of electron current as a function of satellite attitude. The experiment also allowed the grid to be swept from -1.2 to +8 V in order to measure the spacecraft equilibrium potential and the external electron temperature. The addition of a second grid between the grounded outer grid and the collector enabled two three-element probes to measure positive ion and electron currents. One probe, with the inner grid at -15 V, collected incoming positive ions while repelling external electrons and suppressing internal photoelectrons. The second probe, with an inner grid bias at +25 V, measured the incident electron flux and the then unsuppressed photoemission current. Results from this experiment were limited because the decommutation scheme for the satellite was so poor that machine processing was impossible. Some manual recognition of meaningful signal sequences was systematized, and a limited amount of this information formed the total observational data obtained from the experiment.

=== Langmuir Probe ===
Two types of electron temperature probes, both simple modifications of the Langmuir probe, were included in the satellite to obtain direct measurement of electron temperature. One type probe operated in two modes. For the first mode, an aperture grid was maintained at spacecraft potential to monitor the orientation sensitivity of electron diffusion current. In the second mode, a varying potential applied to the aperture grid permitted a measurement of satellite potential and of the ambient electron density and temperature. This probe was mounted near the top of the satellite at about 40° to the spin axis (i.e., flush with the upper conical surface of the satellite). A second, identical probe was symmetrically mounted on the other side of the satellite. This second probe consisted of four sensors located on the satellite's equator. These sensors measured various combinations of ion, electron, and photoemission currents. Derived ion and electron densities were then used for comparison with observations from the other satellite sensors. This experiment had a poorer telemetry resolution than the first type of probe, and, hence, the data were not as useful although they were in good agreement with the data from that probe. Because of a number of rather severe solar flares, the only useful data were limited to those taken during 14 quiet days. Another severe limitation to the collection of useful data was the failure of the commutation system to provide information in a machine-sensible form. The useful data obtained had to be manually recognized, extracted from the telemetry, and processed.

=== Micrometeorite Microphone ===
Two piezoelectric crystals, each attached to two sounding boards acoustically isolated from the satellite skin, were used to measure the frequency and momentum of micrometeorite impact. Information from these sensors was obtained in low-, medium-, and high-sensitivity levels and stored in three independent digital counters. The experiment performed normally.

=== Micrometeorite Photomultiplier ===
A photomultiplier tube, which was made opaque by the evaporation of a coating of aluminum on the front surface, was designed to measure the light energy emitted as a micrometeorite impinged upon the surface and to relate this measured energy to the ambient kinetic energy of the particle. The maximum sensitivity of the sensor to light pulses was of the order of 1.E-14 erg, which means it could detect impacts of particles of 1.E-14 g having a velocity of 20 km/s. The experiment was also intended to determine the erosive effects of micrometeorite impact. As measurable micrometeorites impacted, a portion of the aluminum coating was removed. The photomultiplier then registered the amount of light energy transmitted through the layer from known extraneous light sources. When these data were combined with data on the energy of micrometeorite impacts, the measurement of the erosive effects of a single micrometeorite was obtained. Data from the photomultiplier were received for the life of the battery pack. The light flash detector, however, was also triggered by protons (E>40 MeV), and the data had to be discarded.

=== RF Impedance ===
To measure electron concentration in the ionosphere, the change in capacitance of a dipole antenna on the satellite's equator was measured by using the antenna capacitance to control the frequency of an oscillator. A sweep generator started the probe oscillator on an 80-ms up-and-down sweep in frequency. Every time the probe oscillator swept past 6.5 MHz, a signal passed a crystal filter. Two pulses occurred during each 80-ms sweep, but the times the pulses occurred, in relation to the start of the sweep, were modified by the capacitance of the antenna, which was an integral part of the oscillator-tuned circuit. A computer calculated the time intervals and relayed this information to the telemetry system. By this means, the electron density was measured every 40 ms. Considering the satellite's velocity, this experiment was capable of detecting ionospheric inhomogeneities as small as 300 m (980 ft).

=== Satellite Drag Atmospheric Density ===
Because of its symmetrical shape, Explorer 8 was selected for use in determining upper atmospheric densities as a function of altitude, latitude, season, and solar activity. This experiment was not planned prior to launch. Density values near perigee were deduced from sequential observations of the spacecraft position, using optical (Baker-Nunn camera network) and radio and/or radar tracking techniques. This experiment resulted in the successful determination of reasonable density values and is capable of yielding long-term atmospheric density values as Explorer 8 had an expected orbital lifetime of 80 years.

== Mission ==
Battery power failed on 27 December 1960. Considerable difficulty was encountered with decommutating the telemetered data to make machine processing possible. As a result of these difficulties, the data were mostly processed by hand. In spite of these difficulties, considerable new knowledge about the ionosphere was gained from operation of the satellite. Explorer 8 decayed from orbit on 28 March 2012.

== Display ==
A replica is on display at the Smithsonian National Air and Space Museum's Steven F. Udvar-Hazy Center in Chantilly, Virginia.

== See also ==
- Explorer program
