= Pioneer 3 =

Failed NASA flyby mission to the Moon (1958)

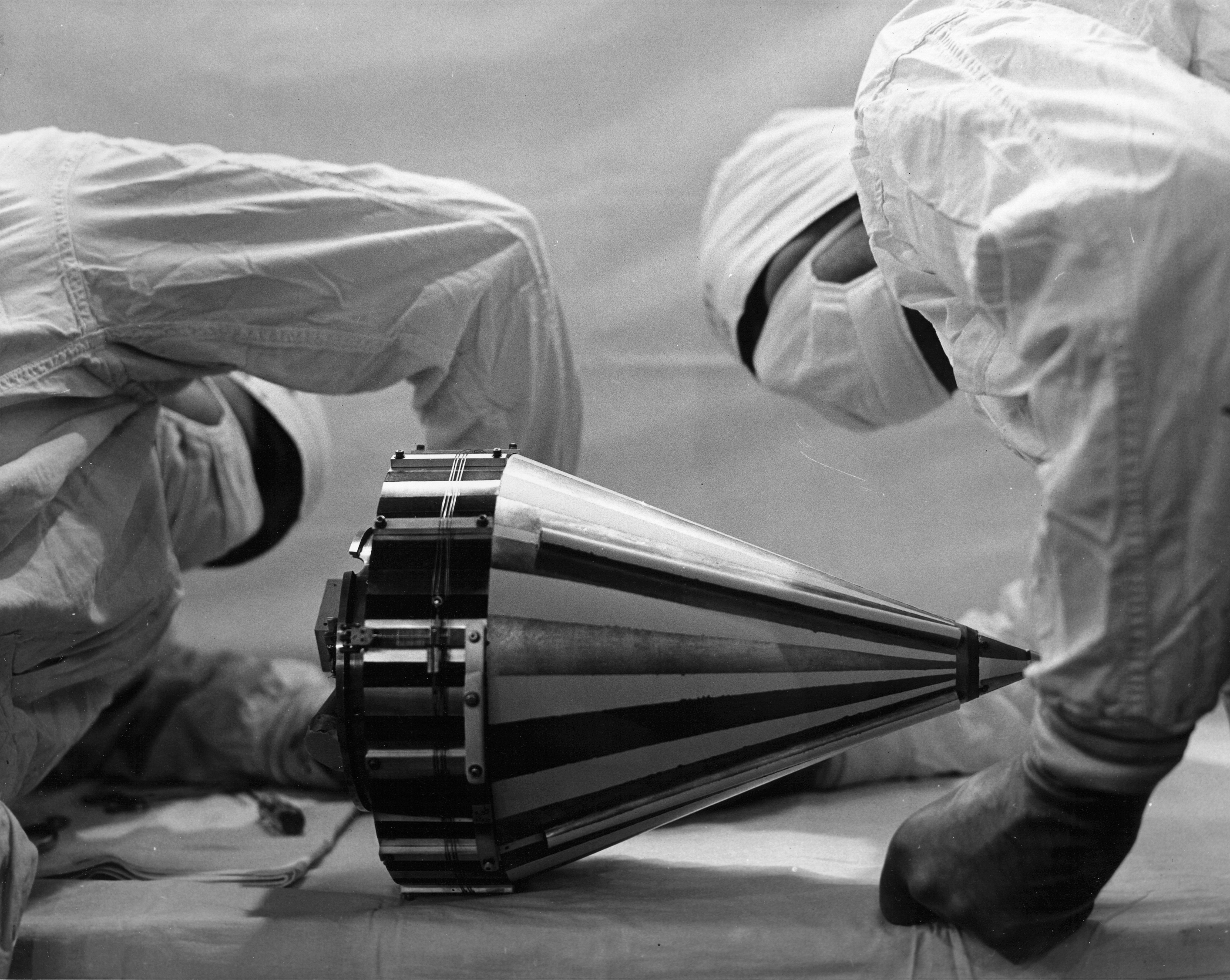
- Pioneer 3 being inspected before shipping to Cape Canaveral
- Mission type: Lunar flyby
- Operator: NASA \ ABMA
- Harvard designation: 1958 Theta 1 (Note: Due to a cataloguing error the spacecraft was assigned Harvard designation 1958 Theta 1 and satellite catalogue number 111 despite never achieving orbit.)
- COSPAR ID: 1958-008A
- SATCAT no.: 111
- Mission duration: 1 day, 14 hours and 6 minutes
- Apogee: 102,360 kilometers (63,600 mi)

Spacecraft properties
- Manufacturer: Jet Propulsion Laboratory
- Launch mass: 5.87 kilograms (12.9 lb)

Start of mission
- Launch date: 6 December 1958, 05:45:12 GMT
- Rocket: Juno II
- Launch site: Cape Canaveral, LC-5

End of mission
- Decay date: 7 December 1958, 19:51 GMT

Pioneer 3 was a spin-stabilized spacecraft launched at 05:45:12 GMT on 6 December 1958 by the U.S. Army Ballistic Missile Agency in conjunction with NASA, using a Juno II rocket. This spacecraft was intended as a lunar probe, but failed to go past the Moon and into a heliocentric orbit as planned. It did however reach an altitude of 102,360 km before falling back to Earth. The revised spacecraft objectives were to measure radiation in the outer Van Allen radiation belt using two Geiger-Müller tubes and to test the trigger mechanism for a lunar photographic experiment.

== Spacecraft design ==
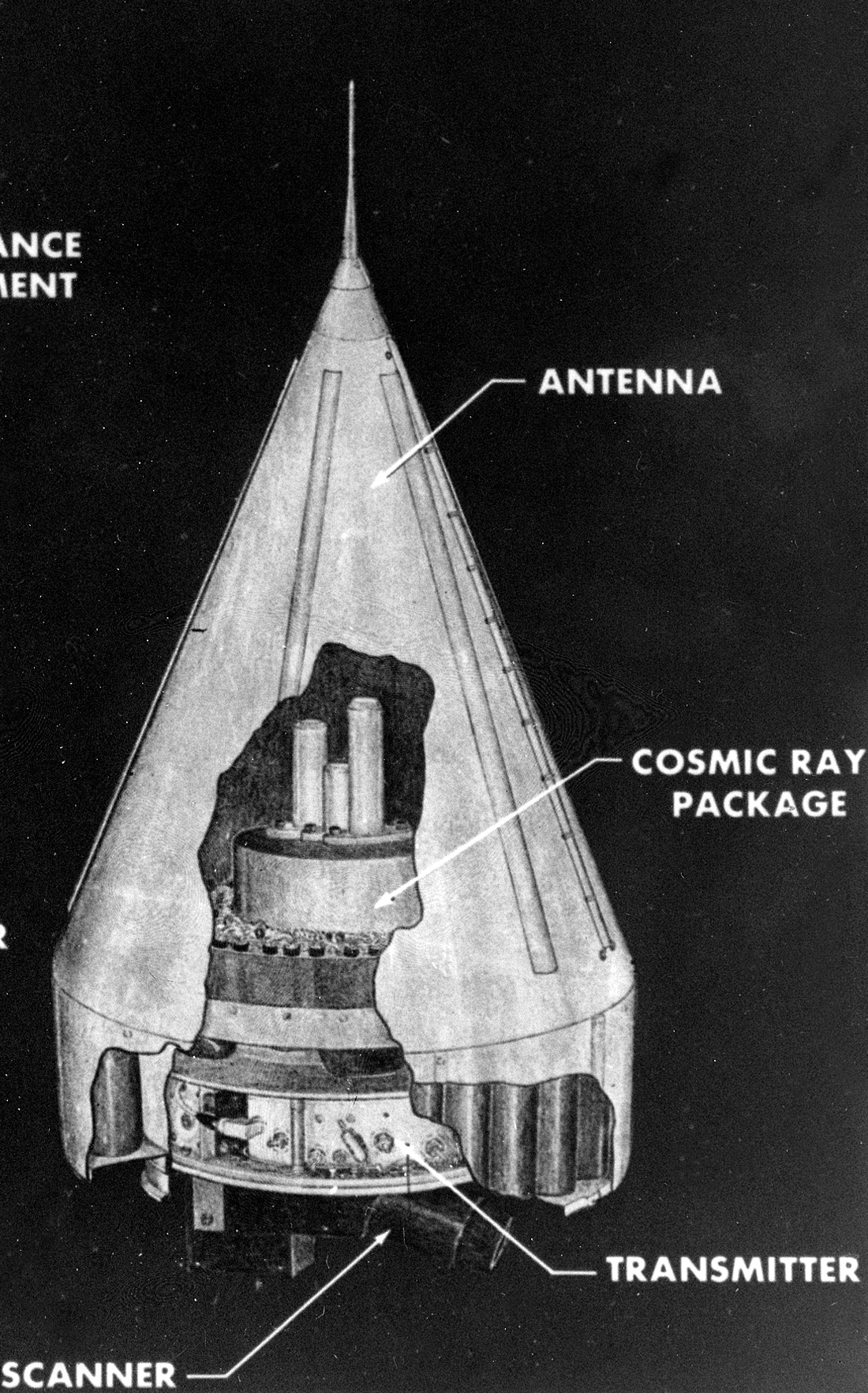
Pioneer 3 diagram

Pioneer 3 was a cone-shaped probe 58 cm high and 25 cm diameter at its base. The cone was composed of a thin fiberglass shell coated with a gold wash to make it electrically conducting and painted with black and white stripes to maintain the temperature between 10 and 50 °C. At the tip of the cone was a small probe which combined with the cone itself to act as an antenna. At the base of the cone, a ring of mercury batteries provided power. A photoelectric sensor protruded from the center of the ring. The sensor was designed with two photocells which would be triggered by the light of the Moon when the probe was within about 30,000 km of the Moon. Under original plans, the probe would have carried a camera capable of taking a single photograph of the Moon, but after the discovery of the Van Allen belts by Explorer 1, the camera was replaced with a Geiger counter for radiation measurement. At the center of the cone were a voltage supply tube and two Geiger-Müller tubes. A transmitter with a mass of 0.5 kg delivered a phase-modulated signal of 0.1 W at a frequency of 960.05 MHz. The modulated carrier power was 0.08 W and the total effective radiated power 0.18 W. A despin mechanism consisted of two 7 gram weights which could be spooled out to the end of two 150 cm wires when triggered by a hydraulic timer 10 hours after launch. The weights would slow the spacecraft spin from 400 rpm to 6 rpm and then weights and wires would be released. While the Thor-Able Pioneer probes were designed to go into orbit around the Moon, the Juno Pioneer probes would crash-land instead, although, given the crude launch vehicle guidance system and direct ascent trajectory, the odds of hitting the Moon were slim. However, a lunar flyby rather than impact would still be considered a successful mission.

== Mission ==
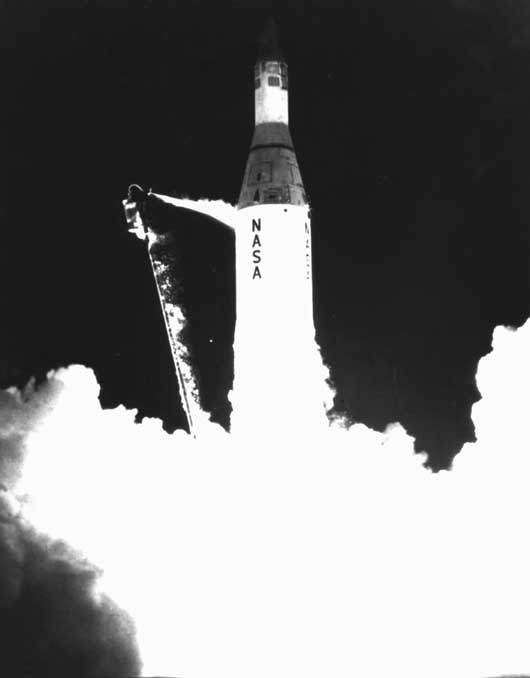
Juno II launching Pioneer 3

The flight plan called for the Pioneer 3 probe to pass close to the Moon after 33.75 hours and then go into solar orbit. The Juno II lifted off from LC-5 at 05:45:12 GMT on 6 December 1958. The launch went entirely according to plan until the first stage cutoff, when the engine cut off 3.7 seconds early due to a failure of the propellant depletion sensors, leaving a velocity shortfall of several hundred feet per second. The injection angle was also about 71° instead of the planned 68°, and the de-spin mechanism also failed to operate. The spacecraft reached an altitude of 102,360 km (109,740 km from the center of the Earth) before falling back to Earth. It re-entered Earth's atmosphere and burned up over Africa on 7 December at approximately 19:51 GMT (2:51 p.m. EST) at an estimated location of 16.4° N, 18.6° E. The probe returned telemetry for about 25 hours of its 38-hour-6-minute journey. The other 13 hours were blackout periods due to the location of the two tracking stations. The returned information showed that the internal temperature remained at about 43 °C over most of the period.

While Pioneer 3 did not meet its primary mission objective of a lunar flyby, the data obtained was of particular value to James Van Allen. The Pioneer 3 probe data in addition to the data from the previous Explorer 1 and Explorer 3 satellites led to the discovery of a distinct second radiation belt around the Earth. The trapped radiation starts at an altitude of several hundred miles from Earth (where the outer belt was first observed by Sputnik 2 and Sputnik 3) and extends for several thousand miles into space. These Van Allen radiation belts surrounding the Earth are named in honor of his discovery.
