= Gordo (monkey) =

American animal sent to space

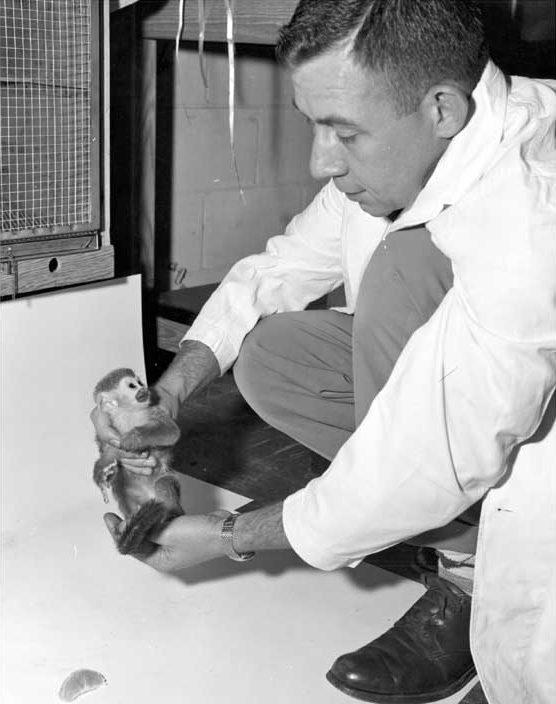
- Gordo with a researcher
- Species: Common squirrel monkey
- Sex: Male
- Known for: Demonstrated viability of human spaceflight
- Weight: 1–1.5 kg (2–3 lb; 2 lb – 3 lb)
- Height: 30 cm (1 ft 0 in)

Gordo was one of the first monkeys to be launched into space. In support of the NASA space program, the U.S. Air Force launched Gordo, also known as Old Reliable, in a U.S. PGM-19 Jupiter rocket from Cape Canaveral on December 13, 1958. The rocket traveled over 1,500 miles and reached a height of 310 miles (500 km) before returning to Earth and landing in the South Atlantic. The data from the spaceflight was critical for future human spaceflight, directly informing NASA's Project Mercury. Despite the successful launch and data collection, a technical malfunction prevented the capsule's parachute from opening and, after a short search, neither Gordo's body nor the vessel were ever recovered. This result highlighted challenges for spacecraft recovery methods as well as ethical concerns over animal testing in space.

== Background ==
Gordo was a South American species of squirrel monkey, about one foot tall and weighing between 1 and 1.5 kg. Missions using monkeys in space were not new, but did not previously include refined physiological monitoring. The species was selected for space travel because of its similar anatomical and physiological makeup to humans and sensitivity to changes in temperature. Further, their small size, ease of handling, and ability to tolerate high gravitational forces made squirrel monkeys more adept to testing in smaller ballistic missile spaces compared to larger macaques used in earlier spaceflight tests. Comparatively, the Soviet Union primarily used dogs preceding crewed launches, presuming them to be less fidgety and not requiring an anesthetic. Only in the 1980s and 1990s did the Soviet Union and its successor state Russia launch a number of rhesus monkeys into space.

The U.S. Navy trained prior to his flight. He went through a structured acclimation process based upon prior animal trials to ensure tolerance to acceleration, isolation, and stress. Mock capsules simulated g-forces, vibration, and confinement to allow physiological data collection without sedatives. His calm demeanor during conditioning and pre-flight assessments earned him the nickname "Old Reliable."

== The flight ==
The flight took place at 0353 hours EST when the Jupiter AM-13 rocket containing Gordo was launched from the Atlantic Missile Range at Cape Canaveral. Gordo wore a leather-lined plastic helmet and specially customized space suit and rode in a tapered capsule behind the nose-cone. He was strapped to a contoured rubber bed with his knees pulled up to reduce the strains of gravity and insulated from temperature change by foil and fiberglass. Gordo was fitted with instruments, including a thermometer, microphone and cardiogram, to monitor his breathing, voice, heartbeat, pulse, blood pressure, and temperature. The rocket ascended to a height of 310 miles while travelling 1500 lateral miles. US Defense officials said the breathing of the monkey slowed after takeoff and his pulse became slightly irregular. Both quickened as the missile gained speed and returned to normal after the nose-cone was beyond the pull of Earth's gravity. Scientists monitoring the flight found that, aside from a slight slowing of the pulse, Gordo suffered no ill effects from the entry into space or resultant weightlessness.

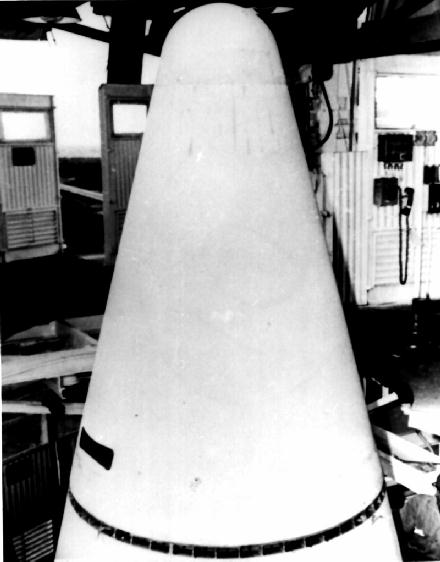
Nose cone containing Gordo shortly before launch

In total the flight lasted 15 minutes, of which Gordo was weightless for 8.3 minutes. He experienced a 10g pressure during takeoff and 40g pressure upon reentry with the missile reentering at 10,000 miles per hour. The float mechanism attached to the nose-cone failed, and after six hours of recovery efforts by the U.S. Army, he was presumed dead as the 28 pound nose-cone sunk in the Atlantic Ocean with Gordo inside. The Pentagon issued a statement that there were no significant adverse physical effects to Gordo during the time of weightlessness nor fall to Earth. It is believed that he was alive at the time of impact.

== Legacy ==
Despite the loss of Gordo, the mission was considered a success by NASA. The critical physiological telemetry data that the mission provided alleviated many concerns over how the human body would cope with weightlessness and the difficulties of space travel. In particular, the signals on his respiration, steady heartbeat, and lack of severe distress proved to US Navy doctors that humans could survive a similar trip. Less than a year later, Gordo was followed into space by the monkeys Able and Baker following a similar launch profile. Both of these monkeys would survive the flight and were recovered unharmed, the first primates to do. Despite these advances, it would be the Russian Yuri Gagarin who would become the first human in space.

Gordo's spaceflight garnered significant media attention, especially within the ongoing Space Race and the Sputnik crisis occurring just one year prior. He was portrayed as a symbol of American ingenuity and detailed coverage of his pioneering flight was provided by newspapers across the United States. However, the decision to send Gordo into space also sparked angry protests from animal rights groups opposing using animal for spaceflight experimentation. The American Society for Prevention of Cruelty to Animals (ASPCA) said only inanimate objects should be used and the British Royal Society for Prevention of Cruelty to Animals similarly expressed "grave concern and apprehension." High mortality rates among early test subjects posed ethical questions about use of animals in space research. These later influenced the development of stricter guidelines followed by NASA and the U.S. Air Force with regard to animal welfare in subsequent missions.

== See also ==
- Monkeys in space
- List of individual monkeys
- Animals in space
- Animal testing on non-human primates
- 1958 in spaceflight (July–December)
