= Miss Able =

American rhesus monkey sent to space (1957–1959)

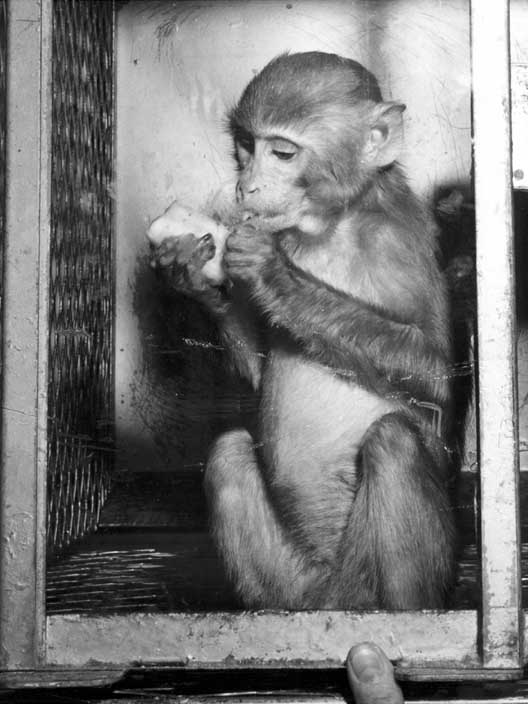
- Able before the spaceflight
- Born: December , 1957; Independence, Kansas, U.S.
- Died: June 1, 1959 (aged 1); Fort Knox, Kentucky, U.S.
- Resting place: National Air and Space Museum
- Other name: Able
- Space career

U.S. Army space pioneer
- Time in space: 16 minutes
- Missions: Jupiter AM-18

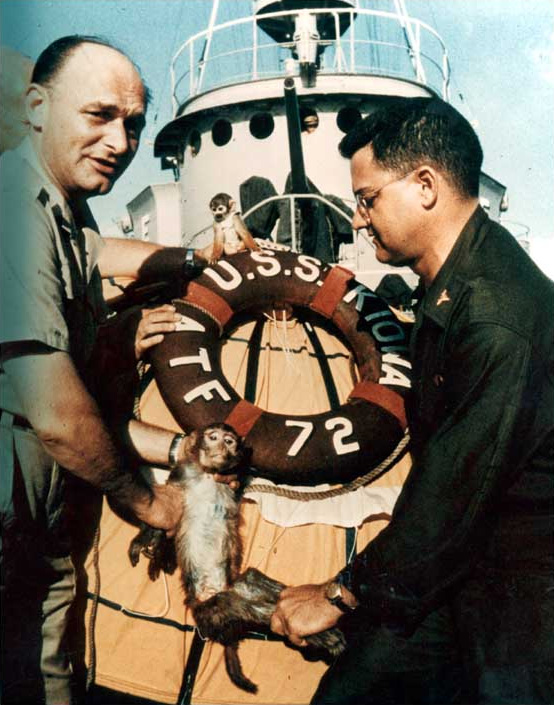
Able (center, bottom) after recovery by the USS Kiowa.

(Miss) Able (December 1957 – June 1, 1959) was a female rhesus macaque who, together with the squirrel monkey Miss Baker, was the first primate to survive space flight. They took off on May 28, 1959, on the Jupiter AM-18 mission from Launch Complex 26 at Cape Canaveral AFS, reached a peak altitude of 480 km, and splashed down 16 minutes later, 2,400 km away in the sea off Puerto Rico, where they were recovered by the USS Kiowa. Shortly afterwards, she died during an operation to remove an implanted electrode. After her death, Able was stuffed and has since been part of the exhibition at the National Air and Space Museum of the Smithsonian in Washington D.C.. Her skeleton is in the collection of the National Museum of Health and Medicine. Unlike their predecessors in American space flight, both were anthropomorphized and stylized as heroes. Able is one of the Smithsonian exhibits that comes to life in the movie Night at the Museum: Battle of the Smithsonian.

== Life ==
Able was born at Ralph Mitchell Zoo in Independence, Kansas. She was selected for the flight just two weeks before launch as a replacement for a wild-caught animal from India, as US President Eisenhower feared that this would strain relations with India. While Miss Baker was the US Navy's contribution to the mission, Able was selected by the US Army. Able's space suit was custom-made, consisting of a suit, a fiberglass helmet, and a small chair with a large back plate, which was custom-made based on a plaster model of a rhesus monkey. During the flight, Able was almost completely immobilized in the contraption. Her task was to press a button whenever a red light came on, which was supposed to trigger a radio pulse. None of these pulses could be recorded during the flight, officially due to a telemetry error, but rumour has it that this was attributed to Able's short training phase after the monkey exchange.

After she and Miss Baker were selected for the flight, they were first named after the first two Greek letters, Alpha and Beta, and later, to better correspond to the usage of the US armed forces, after the first two letters of the US military spelling alphabet at the time.

== The flight and death ==
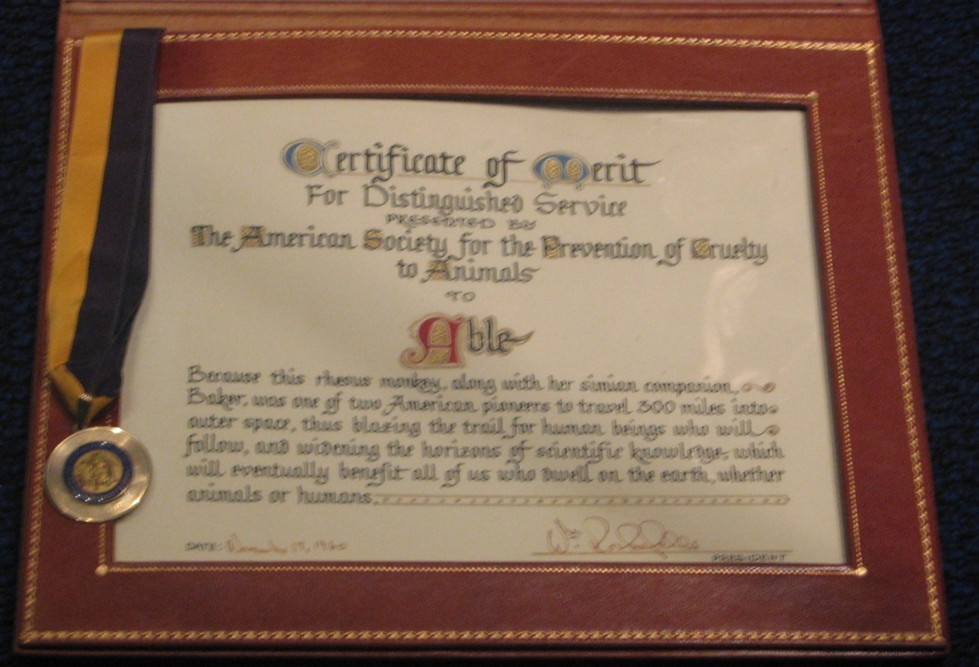
ASPCA Certificate for Able

Both monkeys survived the actual space flight with a few minor cuts and abrasions from their helmets, but otherwise in good health. During the surgical removal of an implanted EEG electrode, complications arose due to the anesthesia, leading to respiratory arrest and, after 2.5 hours of intensive rescue efforts, ultimately death. However, the cause of death could not be determined.

Experiment overview
Measurement	Experiment 2A – Baker	Experiment 2B – Able
species	squirrel monkey	rhesus monkey
weight	1 pound (0.45 kg)	7 pounds (3.2 kg)
flight prep time	8 hours	3 days
electrocardiogram	Yes	problems
electromyogram, extensor	No	Yes
electromyogram, flexor	No	Yes
heart sounds	No	Yes
pulse velocity, femoral vs carotid	No	problems
respiratory rate	Yes	Yes
body temperature	Yes	Yes
ambient temperature	Yes	Yes
ambient capsule pressure	Yes	Yes
relative humidity	No	problems
percent carbon dioxide	No	Yes
monitor electric shock	No	problems
monitor lever response	No	problems
monitor light stimulus	No	Yes
monitor camera	No	Yes
emulsion plates for heavy nuclei of cosmic origin	Yes	Yes

== Legacy ==
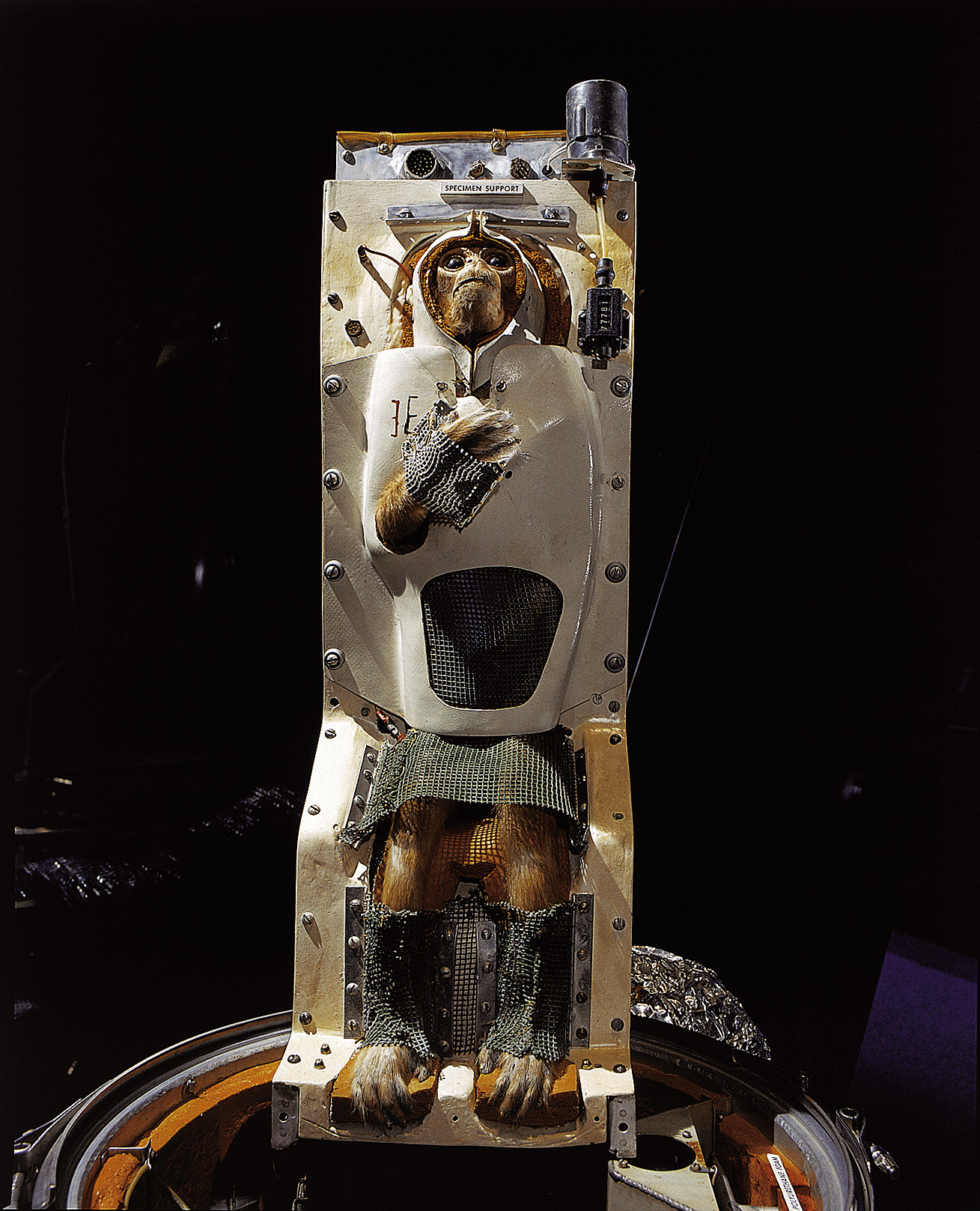
Able, preserved in her flight suit, on display at the National Air and Space Museum, Smithsonian Institution.

Able and Miss Baker quickly became media stars. Two weeks after the flight, their flight was the cover story and they were on the cover of Life magazine. The attempts to revive Able were depicted in four large-format pages. She was embalmed and her body was positioned in a way that evoked a classic American patriotic gesture, a hand-over-the-heart salute.

This is further emphasized by the lighting in the National Air and Space Museum exhibition, where her preserved body can still be viewed today. A slightly altered and revived version of Able, she becomes a male and a capuchin monkey, plays a role in the film Night at the Museum: Battle of the Smithsonian. The gender change serves the purpose of making the monkey appear more patriotic.

== See also ==
- Miss Baker
- Monkeys and apes in space
- Animals in space
