= Miss Baker =

American monkey sent to space (1957–1984)

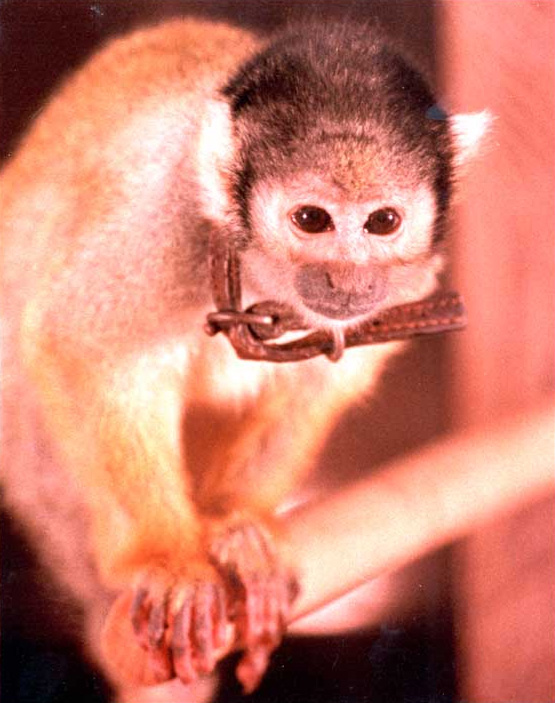
- Born: c. 1957; Iquitos, Peru
- Died: November 29, 1984 (aged 27); Auburn University clinic, Auburn, Alabama, U.S.
- Resting place: U.S. Space & Rocket Center; 34.7119770°N 86.653971°W
- Other name: TLC
- Space career

U.S. Navy space pioneer
- Time in space: 16 minutes
- Mission: Jupiter AM-18

Miss Baker (c. 1957 – November 29, 1984) was a squirrel monkey who in 1959 became, along with female rhesus macaque Able, one of the first two animals launched into space by the United States who safely returned.

== Previous animal flights ==
Previous United States efforts at launching monkeys to space had met with the animals' demise from suffocation or parachute failure, to the chagrin of animal rights activists, although Soviet efforts had fared little better. The Soviet Union had recovered two dogs, the first mammals to be recovered from suborbital space flight, from an altitude of 101 kilometers (331,000 ft) on July 22, 1951 and subsequently recovered more dogs. Albert II became the first monkey and first mammal in space, launched on a V-2 rocket on June 14, 1949. The United States had also flown monkeys and mice by Aerobee rocket to heights below the edge of space beginning in 1951.

== Pre-flight ==
The squirrel monkey who was to become known as Miss Baker was purchased along with 25 other squirrel monkeys at a pet shop in Miami, Florida, and brought to the Naval Aviation Medical School in Pensacola. Fourteen of the candidates tolerated confinement for periods up to 24 hours, electrodes all over their bodies, and monitoring at all hours. Miss Baker "stood out from the rest because of her intelligence and loving, docile manner", relayed Colin Burgess and Chris Dubbs in their 2007 book Animals In Space: From Research Rockets to the Space Shuttle. For this, and her apparent pleasure at being handled with tender loving care, she earned the nickname TLC.

With experiments imminent, the Army named their monkey "Alpha," and the Navy followed with "Bravo," names taken directly from the phonetic alphabet. Before flight, though, the names changed to the first letters of the antiquated Joint Army/Navy Phonetic Alphabet, i.e. "Able" and "Baker".

== The flight ==
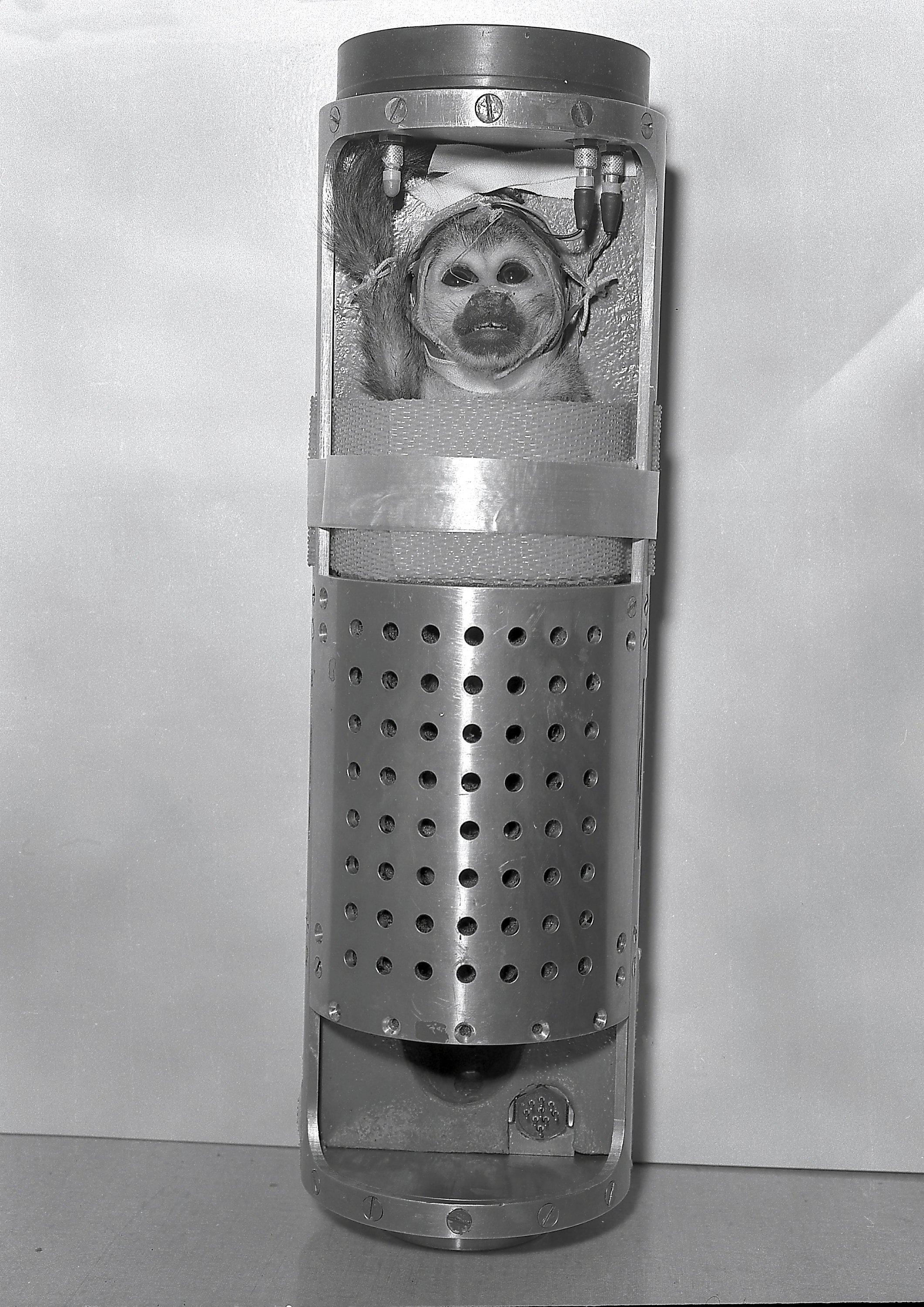
Miss Baker awaits launch.

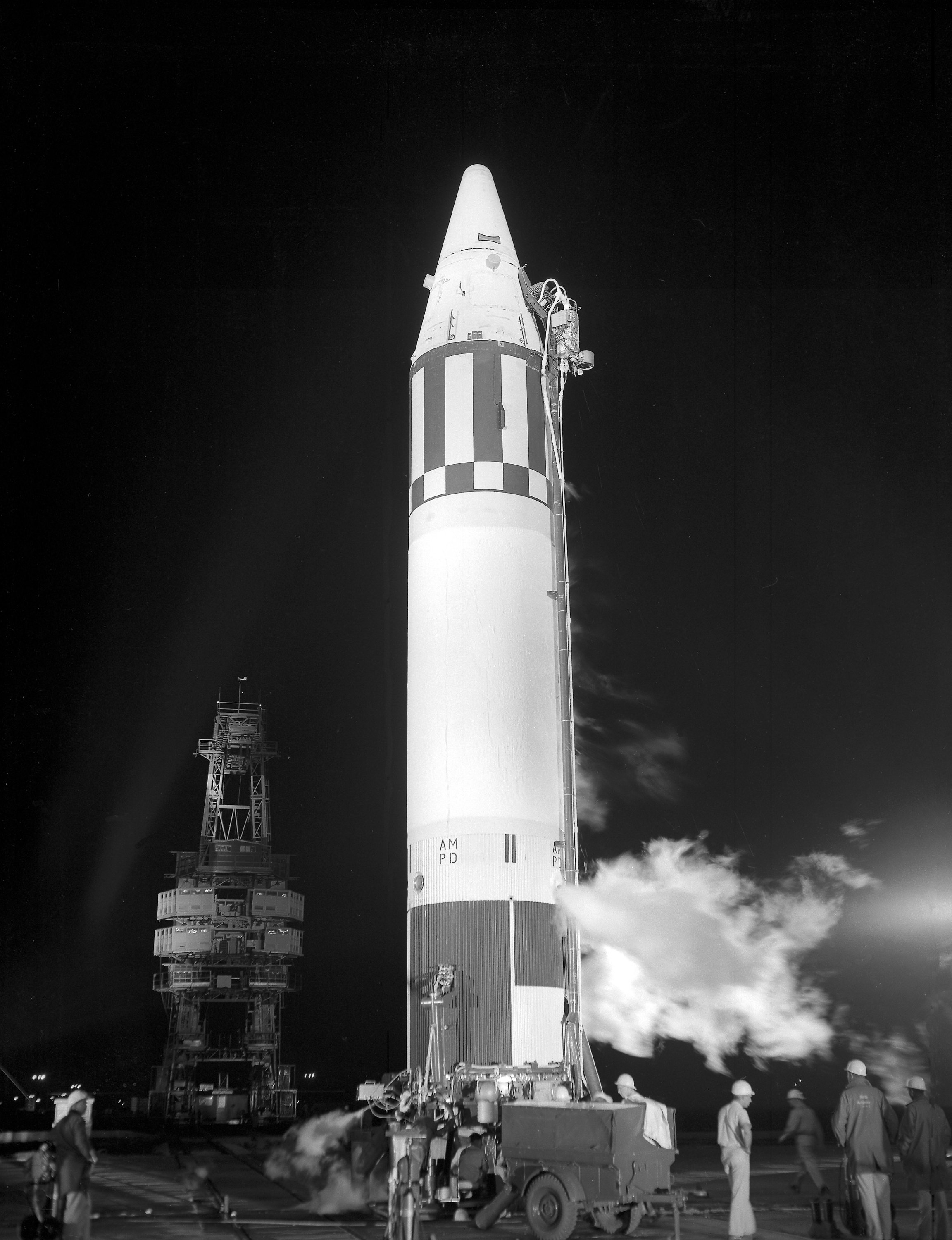
Jupiter AM-18 stands ready for its 2:39 am launch at Cape Canaveral launch complex 26B.

Miss Baker wore a helmet lined with rubber and chamois leather plus a jacket for launch, in addition to a respiration meter affixed to her nose with model cement, and she was fitted into a snug capsule of shoebox size, 9¾ × 12½ × 6¾ inches (24.8 × 31.8 × 17.1 cm) insulated with rubber and fiberglass. Life support was an oxygen bottle with a pressure valve, and lithium hydroxide to absorb exhaled carbon dioxide and moisture.

On May 28, 1959, at 2:39 a.m., a Jupiter rocket lifted Miss Baker and Miss Able to an altitude of 300 miles (480 km) through an acceleration of 38 gs for a 16-minute flight which also included 9 minutes of weightlessness. The flight traveled 1,500 miles (2,400 km) downrange from the pad at Cape Canaveral launch complex 26B to the Atlantic Ocean near Puerto Rico where the capsule was recovered by USS Kiowa.

The following table shows some characteristics of the monkeys on Jupiter AM-18 and the measurements taken during flight. Some of Able's measurements had data problems as indicated.

Experiment overview
| Measurement | Experiment 2A – Baker | Experiment 2B – Able |
|---|---|---|
| species | squirrel monkey | rhesus monkey |
| weight | 1 pound (0.45 kg) | 7 pounds (3.2 kg) |
| flight prep time | 8 hours | 3 days |
| electrocardiogram | Yes | problems |
| electromyogram, extensor | No | Yes |
| electromyogram, flexor | No | Yes |
| heart sounds | No | Yes |
| pulse velocity, femoral vs carotid | No | problems |
| respiratory rate | Yes | Yes |
| body temperature | Yes | Yes |
| ambient temperature | Yes | Yes |
| ambient capsule pressure | Yes | Yes |
| relative humidity | No | problems |
| percent carbon dioxide | No | Yes |
| monitor electric shock | No | problems |
| monitor lever response | No | problems |
| monitor light stimulus | No | Yes |
| monitor camera | No | Yes |
| emulsion plates for heavy nuclei of cosmic origin | Yes | Yes |

Able and Baker were not alone on the flight. They were accompanied by Neurospora; samples of human blood; E. coli; onions; mustard and corn seeds; Drosophila pupae; yeast; and sea urchin eggs and sperm.

Able died four days after the flight from a highly unusual cardiac fibrillation in reaction to anesthesia to remove electrodes. "This is the type of anesthetic death every surgeon fears," said Colonel Robert Hullinghorst, deputy at Ft. Knox where the surgery took place, "We don't know exactly why it occurs." An autopsy found no problems that may have contributed to her death. Able is stuffed and on display at the National Air and Space Museum.

== Post-flight ==
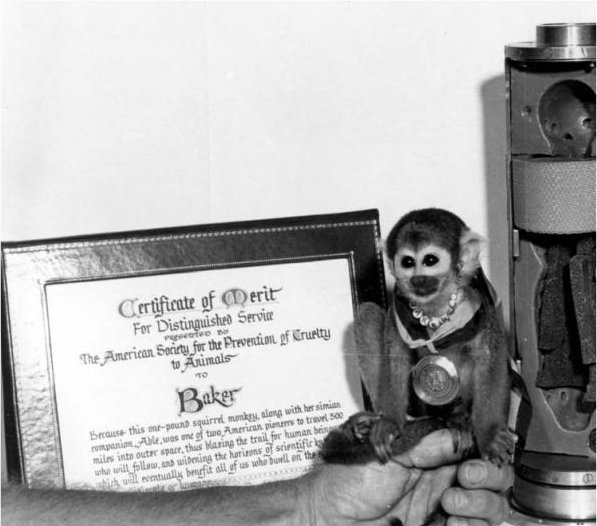
The ASPCA awarded Miss Baker with a Certificate of Merit for Distinguished Service, supporting "'carefully controlled scientific' use of animals as space pathfinders for the 'mutual benefit of man and animals.'"

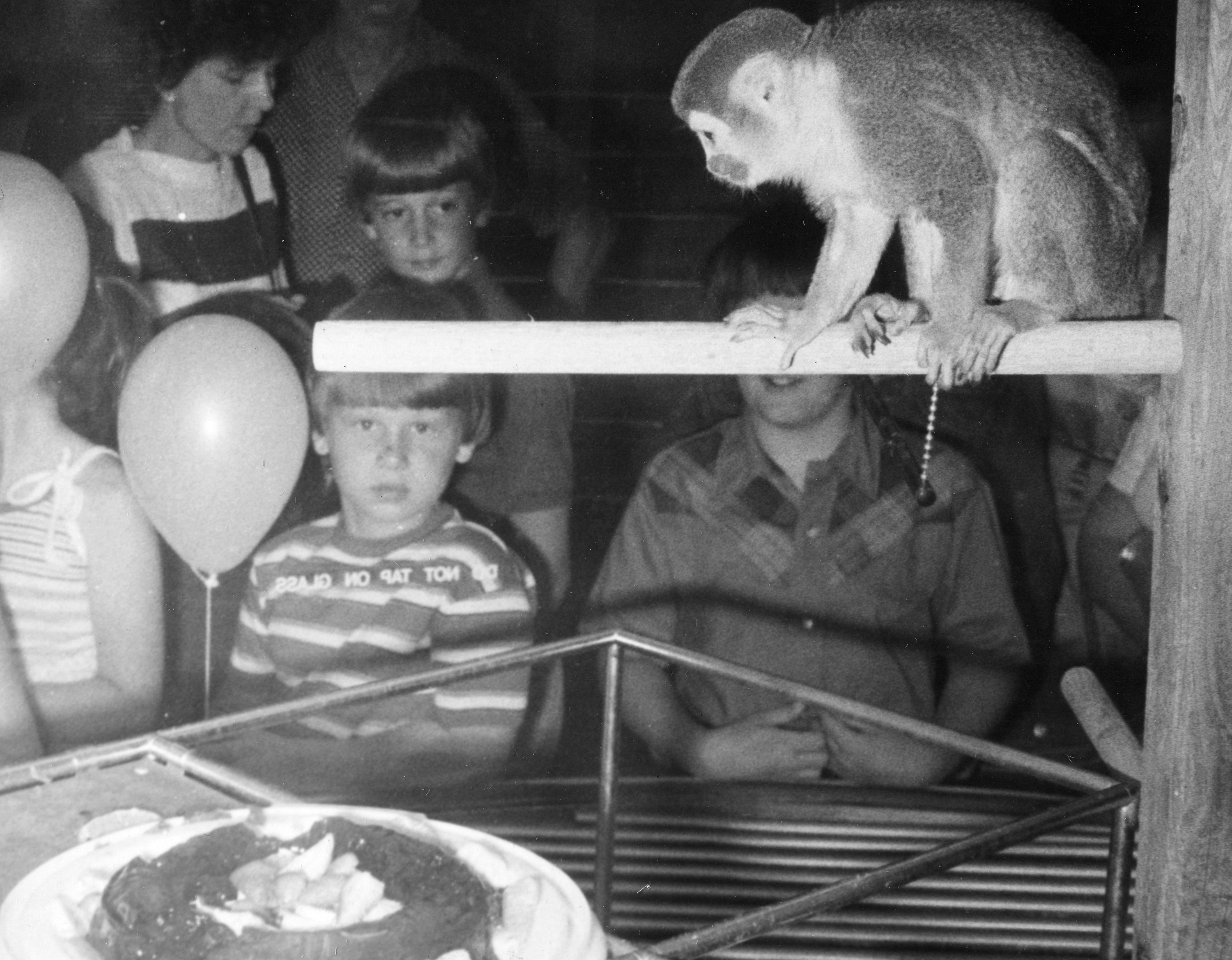
Miss Baker's birthdays were marked by balloons and some of her favorite foods.

Owing to their successful return from space and safe recovery by the USS Kiowa (ATF-72) and their crew, Able and Baker appeared on the cover of Life magazine, June 15, 1959.

In 1962, Pensacola caretakers "married" Miss Baker to Big George. Miss Baker lived at the Naval Aerospace Medical Center in Pensacola, Florida until 1971.

In 1971, Miss Baker moved to the U.S. Space & Rocket Center in Huntsville, Alabama, where she entertained museum visitors and drew 100–150 letters a day from schoolchildren. The 1977 birthday celebrations brought balloons, camera flashes, and the regular fare of cottage cheese for Miss Baker and Big George.

Big George died on January 8, 1979. Three months later, Norman, from the Yerkes National Primate Research Center, became her second mate in a publicity event presided over by Alabama District Court judge Dan McCoy. Miss Baker refused to wear her white wedding train for the event, tearing it off after a few seconds.

In 1982, center director Ed Buckbee said, "Baker delights visitors every day with her energy and antics with her husband Norman." Her birthday was celebrated within a few weeks of the actual day, on the anniversary of her flight, May 28 each year.

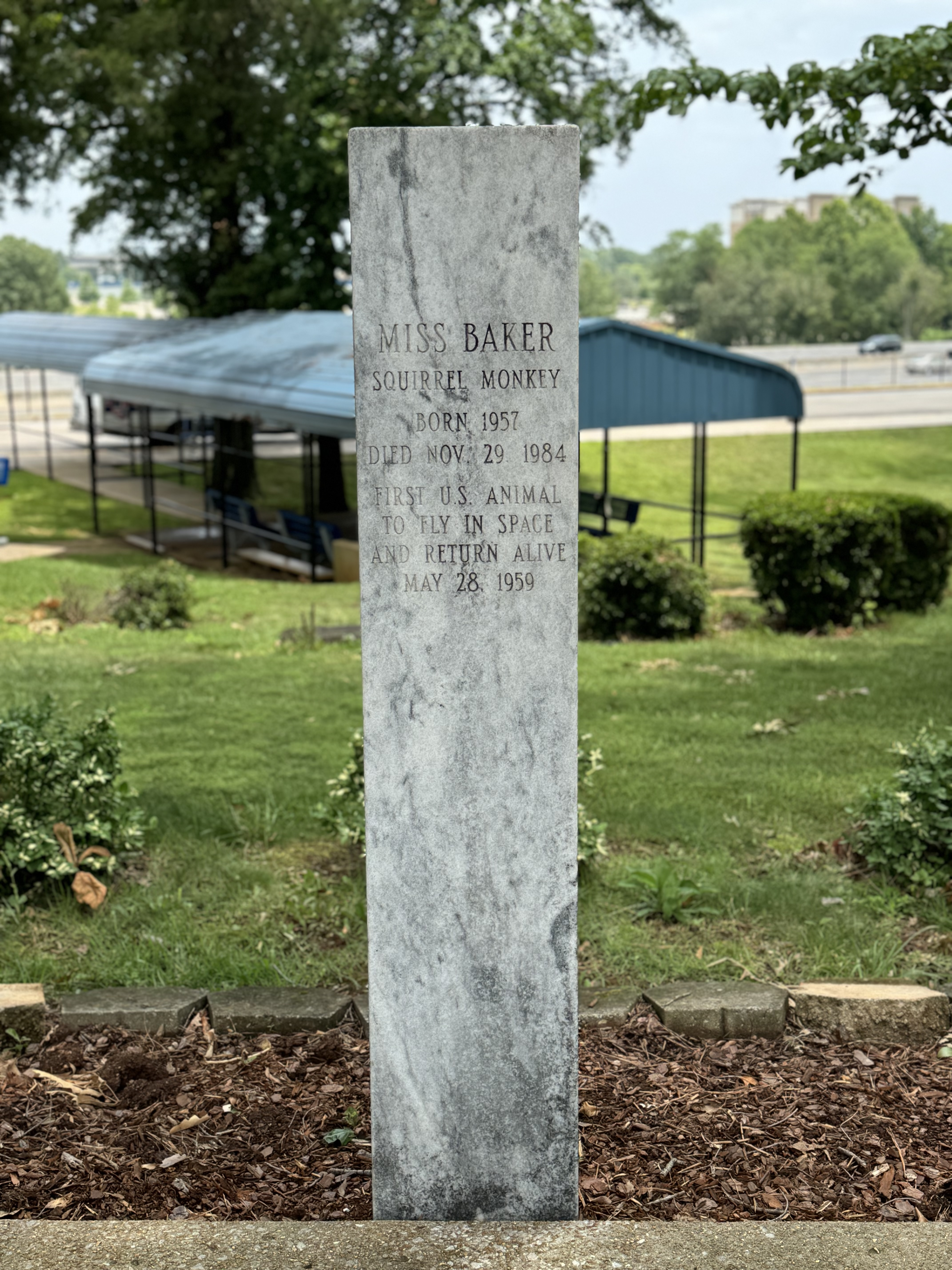
Miss Baker’s gravestone

In celebration of the 25th anniversary of her spaceflight, Baker was treated to a rubber duck and her favorite food, strawberry gelatin with bananas, along with well-wishes from thousands of people.

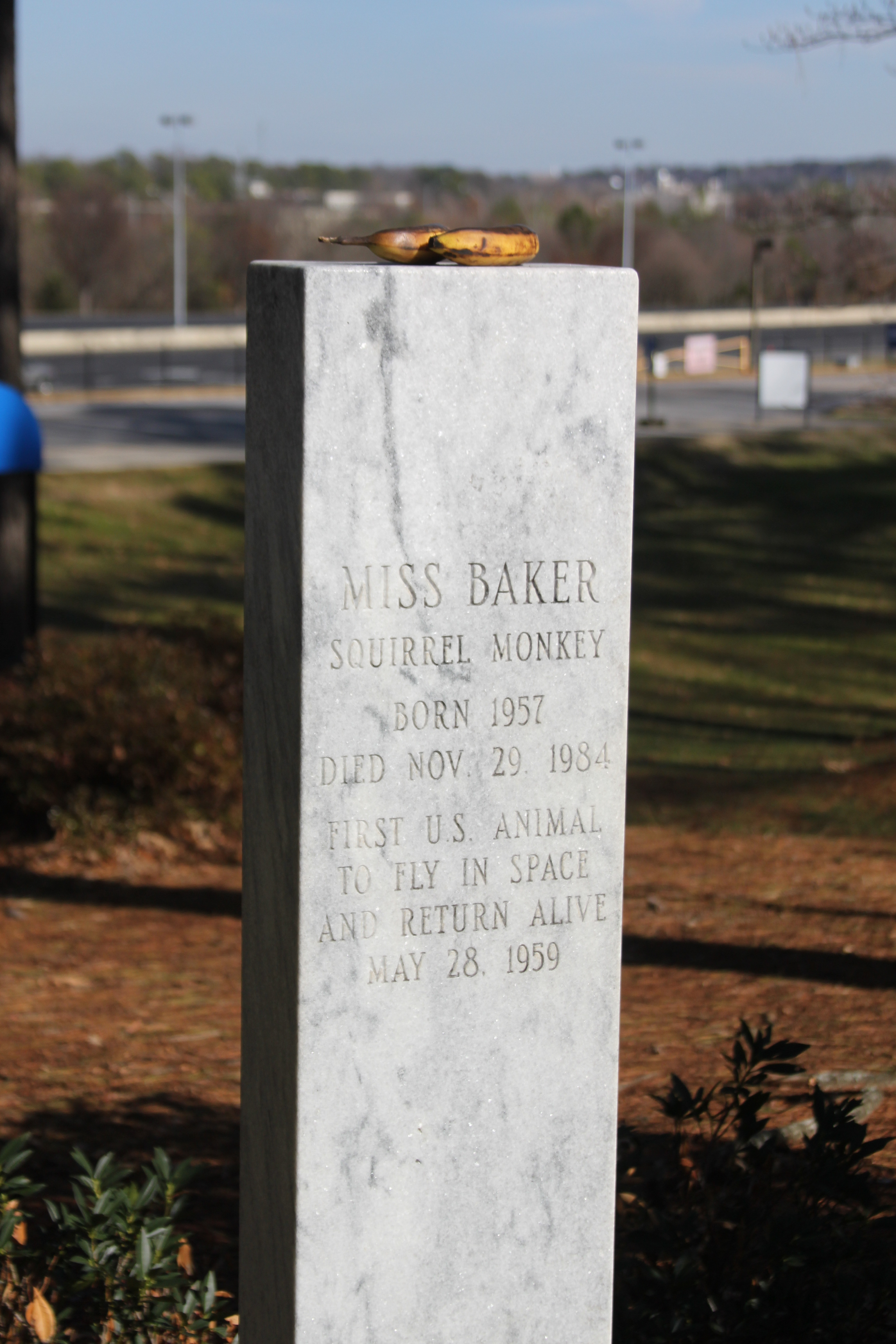
Miss Baker's gravestone frequently has one or more bananas on top.

In 1984, Miss Baker died of kidney failure at a clinic at Auburn University after attaining the record for oldest living squirrel monkey. She is buried on the grounds at the U.S. Space & Rocket Center. Her tombstone routinely has one or more bananas on top.

== See also ==
- List of individual monkeys
