= USS Kiowa (AT-72) =

Tugboat of the United States Navy

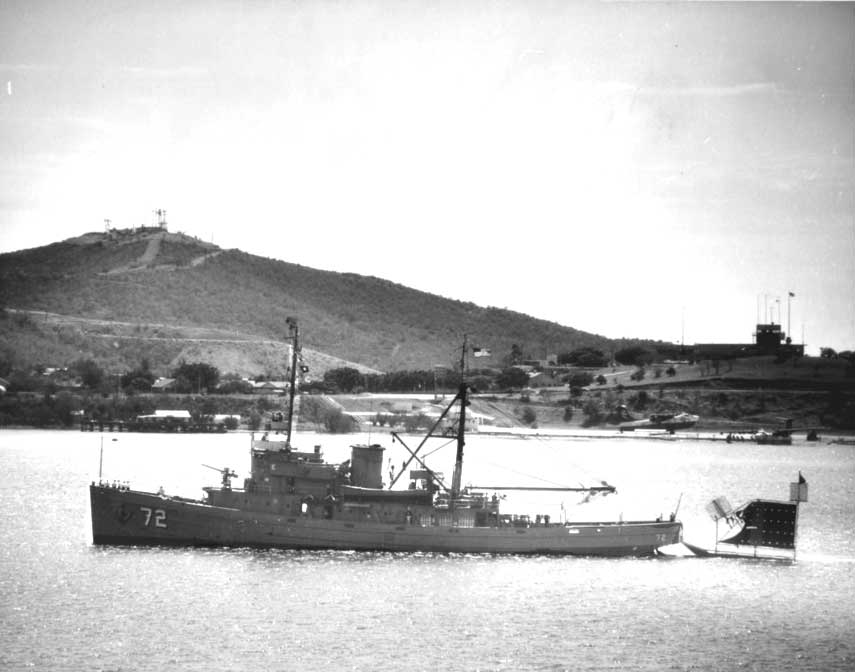
- USS Kiowa (ATF-72) towing a target sled into Guantánamo Bay, Cuba, in a photograph taken from the anti-submarine warfare carrier USS Intrepid (CVS-11) on 27 February 1963.

History

United States
- Name: Kiowa
- Namesake: The Kiowa, a Native American people
- Builder: Charleston Shipbuilding & Drydock Company, Charleston, South Carolina
- Laid down: 22 June 1942
- Launched: 5 November 1942
- Sponsored by: Mrs. Hilda Howe Edwards
- Commissioned: 7 June 1943
- Reclassified: From "fleet tug" (AT-72) to "fleet ocean tug" (ATF-72) 15 May 1944
- Stricken: 15 September 1979
- Honors and awards: One battle star for World War II service
- Fate: Sold for scrapping 12 December 1994

Dominican Republic
- Name: Macorix (RM-21)
- Namesake: The Macorix, a Neo-Taino people of the Dominican Republic
- Acquired: 1972
- Decommissioned: 1986
- Fate: Returned to United States for disposal

General characteristics
- Class & type: Navajo-class fleet tug
- Displacement: 1,164 tons (light)
- Length: 205 ft (62 m)
- Beam: 38 ft 6 in (11.73 m)
- Draft: 14 ft 3 in (4.34 m); 15 ft 4 in (4.67 m) (limiting)
- Propulsion: Diesel-electric: four General Motors 12-278A diesel main engines driving four General Electric generators and three General Motors 3-268A auxiliary services engines; single Fairbanks-Morse main reduction gear; 3,000 shaft horsepower (2.237 megawatts); one shaft; 2,260 barrels (359 m^{3}) diesel fuel
- Speed: 16.5 knots (30.6 km/h)
- Complement: 85 (5 officers, 80 enlisted men
- Armament: 1 × single 3-inch 50-caliber (76.2-mm) gun mount; 2 × single 40-mm antiaircraft gun mounts; 4 × 0.5 in (12.7 mm) machine guns
- Notes: Largest boom capacity 20 tons

The third USS Kiowa (AT-72), later ATF-72, was a Cherokee class fleet tug, later fleet ocean tug, that served in the United States Navy from 1943 to 1972.

== Construction and commissioning ==
Kiowa was laid down by the Charleston Shipbuilding & Drydock Company at Charleston, South Carolina, on 22 June 1942 and launched there on 5 November 1942, sponsored by Mrs. Hilda Howe Edwards. She was commissioned on 7 June 1943 as the fleet tug USS Kiowa (AT-72).

== World War II ==
After shakedown off Key West, Florida, Kiowa proceeded to Norfolk, Virginia. She departed Norfolk on 26 July 1943 for operations off Newfoundland. Kiowa towed all kinds of ships and floating equipment, including towing targets for the new battleship USS Iowa (BB-61) during the summer of 1943, before arriving at New York City on 2 March 1944, to prepare for overseas operations.

Departing New York three weeks later, Kiowa arrived at Falmouth, England, in the United Kingdom on 19 April 1944 as the Allies were in the final planning stages for the invasion of Normandy. On 15 May 1944, she was reclassified as a "fleet ocean tug" and redesignated ATF-72.

Loaded with firefighting and salvage equipment, Kiowa departed England on 3 June 1944; joining a convoy of tank landing ships (LSTs), she made her way toward the largest amphibious operation of World War II. The Normandy landings came three days later on D-Day, 6 June 1944, and as a unit of Task Group 122.3 – Salvage and Fire Fighting Group (Wreck Dispersal Vessel) – Kiowa was engaged actively in repairing landing craft, assisting disabled ships, and performing general salvage duty. She remained off Normandy until 25 July 1944 and then operated in British waters before returning to Norfolk on 30 September 1944.

For the rest of World War II, Kiowa operated along the United States East Coast, towing and assisting disabled ships and escorting Allied merchant ships to the convoy lanes. During the late spring of 1945, she commenced operations as a tanker, fueling a number of ships at sea.

Kiowa received one battle star for her World War II service, for her operations from 6 to 24 June 1944 during the invasion of Normandy.

== 1946–1959 ==
Following World War II, Kiowa arrived at Naval Station Argentia in the Dominion of Newfoundland on 21 December 1945 for duty in the North Atlantic Ocean. From 1946 to 1959 she conducted operations along the coast of North America from the Panama Canal Zone to Newfoundland, engaged in salvage work and the towing of targets and ships.

Arriving at Guantánamo Bay, Cuba, on 9 April 1959, Kiowa prepared for an assignment in the Caribbean Sea in support of the United States space program. She cleared San Juan, Puerto Rico, on 26 May 1959 and took station off Antigua as recovery ship for what was to be the beginning of space flight. On 28 May 1959, she recovered the nose cone of the Jupiter AM-18 medium-range ballistic missile which contained two "monkeys in space," the rhesus monkey Able and squirrel monkey Miss Baker, who were the first living creatures the United States launched into space and returned alive to Earth.

== 1959–1972 ==
From 1959 until early 1965, Kiowa continued towing operations out of Norfolk, and also performed extensive services at Guantanamo Bay. During the latter part of June and all of July 1965, Kiowa operated as a unit of a task force patrolling the West Indies during the second Dominican Republic Crisis, her primary task being to maintain the off-shore pump for petroleum products to besieged Santo Domingo in the Dominican Republic. En route to the United States East Coast after these operations, Kiowa recovered experimental naval mines off San Juan, Puerto Rico, before arriving at her home port, Naval Amphibious Base Little Creek, Virginia, early in August 1965.

On 7 September 1965, Kiowa departed Little Creek for the Mediterranean Sea to join the United States Sixth Fleet. Arriving off Naval Station Rota, Spain, on 20 September 1965, she began target-towing, diving support, and salvaging duties which continued into 1966.

From 26 January to 26 February 1966, Kiowa participated in the search for a hydrogen bomb that fell into the Mediterranean Sea off Palomares, Spain, following the crash of a United States Air Force B-52G Stratofortress bomber after a collision with a tanker aircraft. After this search, Kiowa proceeded to South Wales in the United Kingdom and then to San Juan, Puerto Rico, ultimately arriving home at Little Creek on 16 April 1966.

Kiowa spent the next five months towing targets in the Virginia Capes area before entering drydock at Norfolk on 27 September 1966. Her overhaul completed in late January 1967, Kiowa returned to operations off the United States East Coast, completing a cruise from Bermuda to Canada and back in late 1967.

Kiowa was called in January 1968 to assist the Pogy (SSN-647) after the incomplete nuclear submarine had become adrift off the coast of Florida while under tow from Philadelphia to Mississippi. Kiowa collided with Pogy while attempting to attach a tow line in heavy seas and suffered hull and propeller damage; the attempt had to be abandoned and it was taken up by other vessels.

== Transfer to the Dominican Republic ==
In 1972, Kiowa was loaned to the Dominican Republic under the terms of the Security Assistance Act; she was stricken from the Naval Vessel Register on 15 September 1979. Renamed Macorix (RM-21), she operated in the Dominican Navy until decommissioned in 1986.

== Disposal ==
After the Dominican Navy decommissioned her, Macorix was returned to the custody of the United States. The Defense Reutilization and Marketing Service sold her for scrapping on 12 December 1994
