= PGM-19 Jupiter =

SM-78/PGM-19 Jupiter
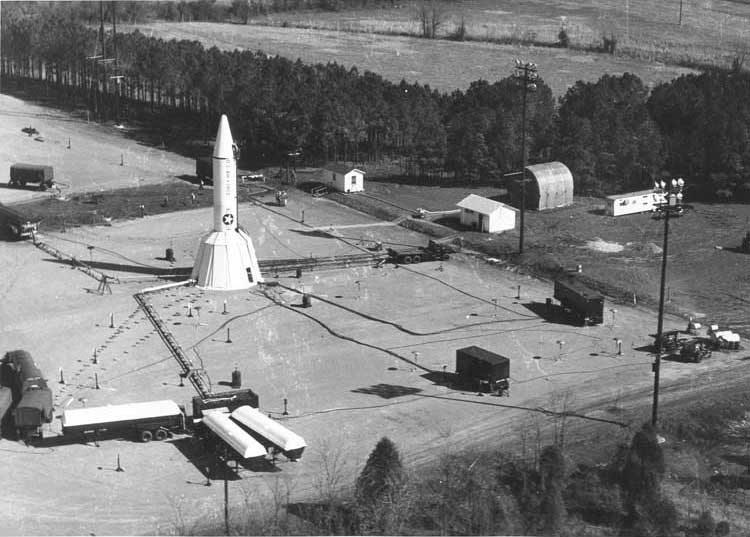
- Jupiter missile emplacement showing ground support equipment. The bottom third of the missile is encased in a "flower petal shelter" of wedge-shaped metal panels allowing crews to service the missile in all weather conditions.
- Type: Medium-range ballistic missile (MRBM)
- Place of origin: United States

Service history
- Used by: United States Air Force; Italian Air Force; Turkish Air Force

Production history
- Designed: 1954
- Manufacturer: Chrysler
- Produced: 1956–1961
- No. built: approx. 100 (45 deployed)
- Variants: Juno II

Specifications
- Mass: 110,000 lb (50,000 kg)
- Length: 60 ft (18.3 m)
- Diameter: 8 ft 9 in (2.67 m)
- Warhead: W38 (3.75 Mt); W49 (1.44 Mt)
- Blast yield: 3.75 Mt; 1.44 Mt
- Engine: Rocketdyne LR79-NA (Model S-3D) liquid LRE; 150,000 lbf (670 kN)
- Propellant: kerosene and liquid oxygen
- Operational range: 1,500–1,700 miles (2,400–2,700 km)
- Flight ceiling: 380 mi (610 km)

The PGM-19 Jupiter was the first nuclear armed, medium-range ballistic missile (MRBM) of the United States Air Force (USAF). It was a liquid-propellant rocket using RP-1 fuel and LOX oxidizer, with a single Rocketdyne LR79-NA (model S-3D) rocket engine producing 150,000 lbf (670 kN) of thrust. It was armed with the 1.44 Mt (6.0 PJ) W49 nuclear warhead. The prime contractor was the Chrysler Corporation.

The Jupiter was designed by the US Army, which needed a highly accurate missile designed to strike enemy states such as China and the Soviet Union. The US Navy also expressed an interest in the design as an SLBM but dropped the collaboration to work on their solid-fuel Polaris. Jupiter retained the short, squat shape intended to fit in submarines.

== Development history ==
=== Initial concept ===
Jupiter traces its history ultimately to the PGM-11 Redstone missile, the US's first nuclear ballistic missile. While it was entering service, Wernher von Braun's Army Ballistic Missile Agency (ABMA) team at Redstone Arsenal began to consider an upgraded version using the LR89 rocket engine being developed by Rocketdyne for the Air Force's Atlas missile project. Using the LR89 and adding a second stage would allow the new design to reach 1,000 nautical miles (1,900 km; 1,200 mi), a dramatic improvement over the Redstone's roughly 200 miles (320 km).

As Rocketdyne continued working on the LR89, it appeared that it could be improved to increase thrust over the promised 120,000 pounds-force (530,000 N). In 1954, the Army asked Rocketdyne to provide a similar design with a thrust of 135,000 pounds-force (600,000 N). During this same period, the weight of nuclear warheads was rapidly falling, and by combining this engine with a warhead of 2,000 pounds (910 kg) they could build a single-stage missile able to reach 1,500–1,700 miles (2,400–2,700 km) while being significantly less complicated and easier to handle in the field than a two-stage model. This engine was continually upgraded, ultimately reaching 150,000 pounds-force (670,000 N). This last model, known to the Army as the NAA-150-200, became much better known by its Rocketdyne model number, S-3.

=== Navy SLBM interest ===
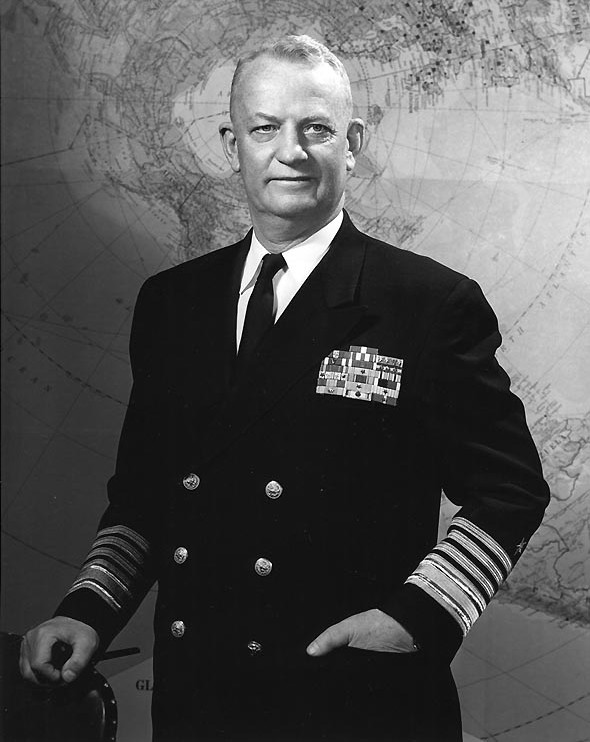
Admiral Arleigh Burke is credited with breaking the Navy out of its moribund ways, and pressing for development of the SLBM.

Around the same time, the US Navy was looking for ways to join the nuclear club, and had been focusing mostly on cruise missiles and similar systems. Some consideration had been given to the use of ballistic missiles on ships, but Admiral Hyman Rickover, "father" of the nuclear submarine, was skeptical that this could be done, and was worried it would take up funding needed elsewhere. Another skeptic of missiles was the Chief of Naval Operations, Robert B. Carney.

Lower-ranking Navy officials became increasingly interested when the Army and Air Force began serious development of their long-range missiles. In an attempt to bypass high-ranking Navy officials, who remained uninterested in the concept, the Navy liaison to the Killian Committee championed the cause. The Committee took up the concept, and in September 1955 released a report calling for the development of a sea-based missile system.

The Navy's interest in missiles had been greatly increased with the August 1955 appointment of Admiral Arleigh Burke to replace Carney. Burke was convinced the Navy had to get into the missile field as rapidly as possible, and was well aware that the Air Force would oppose any such endeavor. Instead, he approached the Army, and found that the proposed Jupiter fit the range goals needed by the Navy.

=== Development begins ===
The issue of who would be given the go-ahead to build an IRBM by this time had reached the Joint Chiefs of Staff (JCS), who proved unable to reach a decision. This forced the Secretary of Defense Charles Erwin Wilson to move ahead without an official recommendation from the military. He saw the Navy interest as a reasonable argument to continue the Army project in any event, and on 8 November 1955 approved both programs. The Air Force would develop IRBM No. 1, or SM-75 (for "strategic missile"), the Army would develop their design as IRBM No. 2 or SM-78. The Navy would develop systems to launch the Army missile from ships and, later, submarines. BuShips completed a conceptual design that would take a Maritime Administration type C4-S-1a hull and convert it into a Jupiter missile launch ship, which was given the hull symbols YAG-58 then EAG-155; the conversion would later be canceled.

The requirement for shipboard storage and launching dictated the size and shape of the Jupiter. The original Army design was 92 feet (28 m) long and 95 inches (2,400 mm) in diameter. The Navy stated they were not interested in anything longer than 50 feet (15 m). The ABMA team responded by increasing the diameter to 105 inches (2,700 mm). This precluded it from being carried aboard contemporary cargo aircraft, limiting it to sea and road. Even with this change, they were unable to reduce its length enough to suit the Navy. They suggested that they begin with a 60 foot (18 m) long version and then scale it down as improvements in the engines were worked into the design. This was rejected, and after briefly considering a 55 foot (17 m) version, finally settled on the 58 foot (18 m) version.

On 2 December 1955, the secretaries of the Army and Navy publicly announced the dual Army–Navy program to create a land- and sea-based MRBM. In April 1956, as part of a widespread effort to assign names to various missile projects, the Army's effort was given the name "Jupiter" and the Air Force's became "Thor".

=== Accuracy and mission ===
Redstone provided an accuracy of 980 feet (300 m) at its maximum range, which, when combined with its large warhead, allowed it to attack hard targets like protected airbases, bridges, command and control sites, as well as other strategic targets like railway marshaling yards and pre-attack concentration areas. This was in keeping with the Army's view of nuclear weapons, which was in effect more powerful artillery. They saw the weapons as part of a large-scale battle in Europe, in which both sides would use nuclear weapons during a limited war that did not include the use of strategic weapons on each other's cities. In that case, "if wars were to be kept limited, such weapons would have to be capable of hitting only tactical targets." This approach saw the support of a number of influential theorists, notably Henry Kissinger, and was seized on as a uniquely Army mission.

The original goal for the new longer-range design was to match Redstone's accuracy at the Jupiter's much-extended range. That is, if Redstone could reach 980 ft (300 m) at 200 miles (320 km), the new design would provide a circular error probable on the order of 4.3 miles (7 km). As development continued, it became clear the ABMA team, under the direction of Fritz Mueller, could improve on that. This led to a period in which "The Army would lay down a particular accuracy, and wait for our arguments whether it was possible. We had to promise a lot, but were fortunate."

This process ultimately delivered a superior design intended to provide 0.5 miles (0.80 km) accuracy at the full range, an order of magnitude better than Redstone and four times better than the best INS designs being used by the Air Force. The system was so accurate that a number of observers expressed their skepticism about the Army's goals, with the WSEG suggesting they were hopelessly optimistic.

The Air Force was dead set against Jupiter. They argued that nuclear weapons were not simply new artillery, and that their employment would immediately trigger a response that might result in a strategic exchange. This would especially be true if the Army launched a long-range weapon like Jupiter, which could reach cities in the Soviet Union and could not immediately be distinguished as attacking a military or civilian target. They suggested that any such launch would trigger a strategic response, and as such, the Army should not be given any long-range weapons.

However, as von Braun's team went from success to success, and with Atlas still years from operational deployment, it was clear that Jupiter represented a threat to the Air Force's desired hegemony over strategic forces. This led to them starting their own MRBM program Thor, in spite of having repeatedly dismissed the medium-range role in the past. The fighting between the Army and Air Force grew through 1955 and 1956 until practically every missile system the Army was involved in was being attacked in the press.

=== Navy exit ===
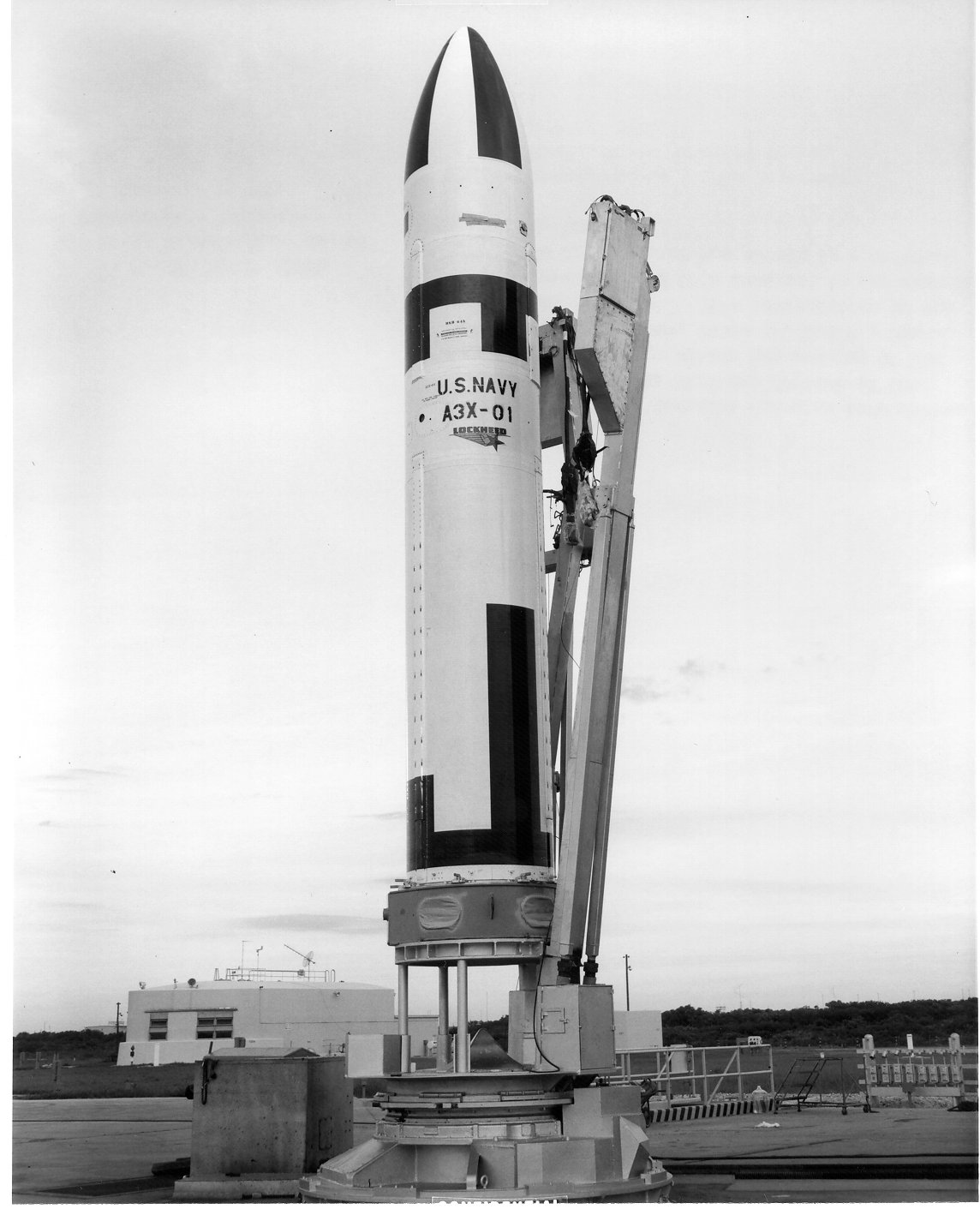
The Navy's Polaris had range similar to Jupiter.

The Navy was concerned from the start about Jupiter's cryogenic propellants, but at the time there was no other option. Given the size and weight of contemporary nuclear weapons, only a large liquid-fuel rocket engine provided the energy needed to meet the Navy's range goal of launching from safe areas in the Atlantic Ocean. They justified the risk thus:

We were prepared to take the chance that we might lose a submarine or two through accidental explosions. But, then, there are some of us who enjoy, or at lease [sic] are acclimated to, the idea of risking our lives."

All of this changed radically in the summer of 1956, when Project Nobska brought together leading scientists to consider antisubmarine warfare. As part of this workshop, Edward Teller stated that by 1963 a 1 megaton warhead would be reduced to only 600 pounds (270 kg). Rocketry experts at the same meeting suggested that an intermediate-range weapon carrying one of these weapons could be built using solid propellant. Even in this case, the missile would be much smaller than Jupiter; Jupiter was expected to weigh 160,000 pounds (73,000 kg), while estimates of a solid-fuel missile with similar range were closer to 30,000 pounds (14,000 kg), along with a similar reduction in size which was of paramount importance to a submarine design.

The Navy announced their desire to develop their own missile that summer, initially under the name Jupiter-S. After intensive follow-up studies, the Navy withdrew from the Jupiter program in December 1956. This was officially announced by the Army in January 1957. In its place, the Navy began development of what was then known as the Fleet Ballistic Missile Program, and the missile was later renamed Polaris, their first submarine-launched ballistic missile (SLBM). Rickover, one of the few remaining skeptics, was won over by pointing out that a properly designed submarine was needed specifically for this role, and he would be called upon to produce it. Rickover was from that point on a staunch ally of the program.

=== Saved from cancellation ===
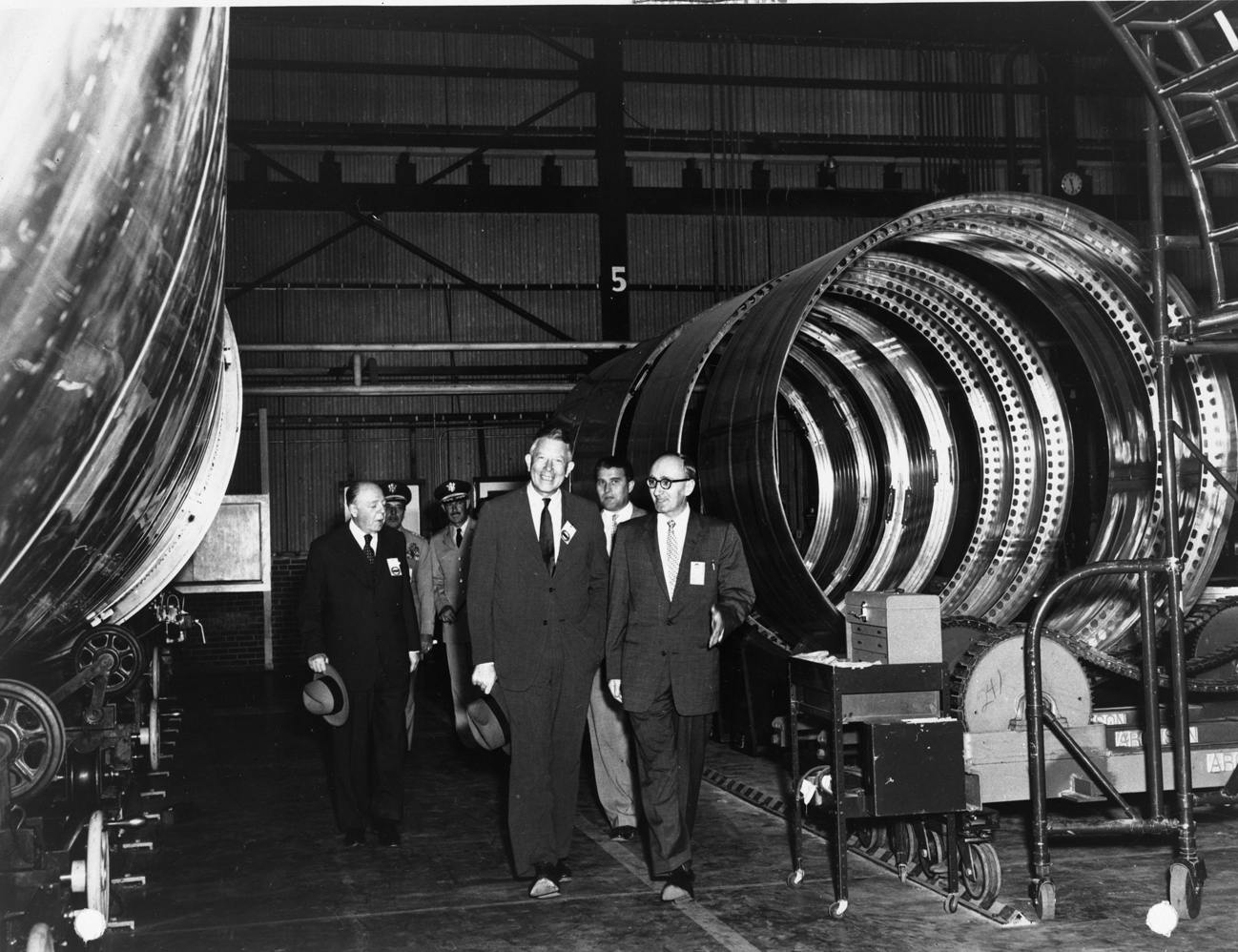
Secretary of Defence Neil McElroy visits the Jupiter prototype assembly line at ABMA. ABMA built the test articles, while Chrysler built the production models.

On 4 October 1957, the Soviets successfully launched Sputnik I from their R-7 Semyorka ICBM. The US was aware of these efforts and had already talked to the press about it, suggesting that if the Soviets launched a satellite first it would be no big deal. To their surprise, the press exploded in rage over the affair. Having spent over a decade working on similar missiles, like Atlas, the fact that the Soviets could beat them was a serious blow, and prompted a deep review of the ongoing programs.

One problem noted from the start was that the internecine fighting between the Army and Air Force was leading to significant duplication of effort, with little to show for it. The Department of Defense responded by creating the Advanced Research Projects Agency (ARPA), whose initial mission was to look over all of the ongoing projects and select ones based solely on their technical merits.

At the same time, the fighting had begun to have negative political effects. In a 26 November 1956 memorandum, recently appointed US Secretary of Defense Charles Erwin Wilson attempted to end the fighting. His solution was to limit the Army to weapons with 200-mile (320 km) range, and those involved in surface-to-air defense to only 100 miles (160 km). The memo also placed limits on Army air operations, severely limiting the weight of the aircraft it was allowed to operate. To some degree this simply formalized what had largely already been the case in practice, but Jupiter fell outside the range limits and the Army was forced to hand them to the Air Force.

The Air Force, of course, had no interest in taking over a weapon system they had long argued was not needed. However, ARPA's studies clearly showed it was an excellent system, and as it was ready to enter production, any Air Force thoughts about canceling it were immediately quashed. New orders for 32 prototypes and 62 operational missiles were soon placed, bringing the total number of Jupiters to be built to 94. The first, hand-built at ABMA, would be delivered by the end of FY57, and the first production models from Chrysler's Michigan Ordinance Missile Plant near Warren, Michigan between FY58 and FY61.

=== Lingering complaints ===
A primary complaint about Jupiter was that the design's shorter range placed it within relatively easy striking distance of Soviet weapons, both missiles and aircraft. Thor, based in the UK, would likely have more warning of an impending attack. (Note: The Army noted that an overwater approach to the UK meant that Thor had little warning at all.) This is precisely the reason that the Army spent considerable effort on making Jupiter mobile, in order to make surprise attacks difficult without prior aerial reconnaissance missions.

However, in November 1958, the Air Force decided Jupiter would be launched from fixed emplacements. Army General Maxwell Taylor argued this was done deliberately, noting that:

...a mobile missile needs Army-type troops to move, emplace, protect and fire it... a decision to organize mobile ballistic missile units would in logic have led to transferring the operational use of the weapon back to the Army – where it should have been all the time.

To offset the possibility of air attack, the systems were upgraded to allow a launch within 15 minutes of a launch order.

== Testing history ==
Rocketdyne tested the first S-3 engine at their Santa Susana, California facilities in November 1955. A mock-up was delivered to ABMA in January 1956, followed by the first prototype engines in July 1956. Testing of these engines began in September 1956 at ABMA's new Power Plant Test Stand. This demonstrated a number of problems with unstable combustion, leading to the failure of four engines by November. To continue testing, the engine was temporarily derated back to 135,000 lbf and was successfully tested at this level in January 1957. Continued work on the engine developed several sub-versions, finally reaching the design goal of 150,000 lbf in the S-3D model.

The 135,000 pound engine, also used in the first Thor and Atlas tests, had conical thrust chambers, but the 150,000 pound model switched to bell-shaped thrust chambers. Unlike Thor and Atlas, which had two small vernier engines for roll control, Jupiter gimbaled the turbine exhaust. The early test model Jupiters had two small gas jets powered off the turbine exhaust, the gimbaled exhaust pipe not being introduced until late 1958.

=== Static tests ===
In 1954 Test Laboratory director Karl Heimburg began construction of the Static Test Stand for Redstone testing. This was still under construction when it was re-purposed for Jupiter, and finally completed in January 1957. A Jupiter was installed in the stand that month, and fired for the first time on 12 February 1957. This almost ended in disaster when a small explosion went off in the liquid oxygen (LOX) pump, and as the missile sat there the LOX boiled off and threatened to burst the tanks. The day was saved when the foreman, Paul Kennedy, ran to the missile and connected a pressure line to drain the oxygen buildup in the tank. The problem was later traced to the lubricant used in the pump, which tended to burst into flames in contact with LOX. A new lubricant was introduced, along with a series of changes to the test stand to help retain control in these situations.

=== Flight tests ===
Kurt Debus had led the construction of launch pads for Redstone missiles at Cape Canaveral, Florida, building the twin LC-5 and LC-6 pads about 500 feet (150 m) apart with a common blockhouse located 300 feet (91 m) away between the two. Redstone testing moved to these pads from the smaller LC-4 on 20 April 1955, with the launch of the seventh Redstone from LC-6. Envisioning an extended test program, a second set of similar pads began construction in 1956, LC-26 A and B; the only major difference was the blockhouse was located slightly further away, about 400 feet (120 m). In late 1957 a set of parallel railway tracks running just east of the pads was added, allowing an A-frame gantry to be rolled to any of the four pads.

Jupiters were delivered to the Cape strapped to wheeled trailers and flown to the Cape's "Skid Strip" on C-124s. They were then moved to Hangar R at the Cape Industrial Area where the nose cone was mated with the missile, and electrical checkout was performed. It was then moved on the trailer to the pads, about 3.5 miles (5.6 km) south, where they were lifted to vertical by a crane on the movable gantry. Just to the north of the launch area was the Air Force's LC-17 for Thor, and LC-18 used for Thor and the Navy's Vanguard. After the Army's head start, the Air Force had since caught up and attempted its first Thor launch on 26 January 1957, which ended with the missile exploding on the launch pad.

Jupiter test flights commenced with the launch of AM-1A (ABMA Missile 1A) on 1 March 1957 from LC-5. This missile was equipped with the lower-thrust interim engine. The vehicle performed well until past 50 seconds into launch when control started to fail, leading to breakup at T+73 seconds. It was deduced that turbopump exhaust was sucked up by the partial vacuum in the area behind the missile and began to burn in the tail section. The heat burned through the control wiring, so extra insulation was added there on future flights. An identical AM-1B was quickly readied and launched on 26 April. AM-1B's flight went entirely according to plan up to T+70 seconds when the missile started becoming unstable in flight and finally broke up at T+93 seconds. The failure was deduced to have been the result of propellant slosh due to bending modes induced by the steering maneuvers needed to perform the flight trajectory. The solution to this problem involved testing several types of slosh baffles in a Jupiter center section until discovering a suitable type for both the LOX and fuel tanks.

The third Jupiter, also numbered AM-1, was quickly equipped with the baffles and launched on 31 May, slightly over a month after AM-1B, traveling a full 1,247 nautical miles (2,309 km; 1,435 mi) downrange. This version had a slightly improved S-3 engine with 139,000 pounds-force (620,000 N) thrust. AM-2 flew from LC-26A on 28 August, and successfully tested the separation of the rocket body from the reentry vehicle section before splashing down at 1,460 nautical miles (2,700 km; 1,680 mi). AM-3 flew from LC-26B on 23 October, including the ablative heat shield and the new ST-90 INS. This test flew a planned distance of 1,100 nautical miles (2,000 km; 1,300 mi).

AM-3A launched on 26 November and all went according to plan until T+101 seconds when engine thrust abruptly terminated. The missile broke up at T+232 seconds. On 18 December, AM-4 lost thrust T+117 seconds and fell into the ocean 149 nautical miles (276 km; 171 mi) downrange. These failures were traced to an inadequate turbopump design that resulted in a string of failures in the Jupiter, Thor, and Atlas programs, all of which used a variant of the same Rocketdyne engine. Testing then paused for five months while Rocketdyne came up with a number of fixes and the Army retrofitted all its Jupiters with the redesigned pumps. In spite of these failures, Jupiter was declared operational on 15 January 1958.

Taking the time to also fully rate the engine to 150,000 lbf, the new engine was first flown on AM-5 on 18 May 1958 from LC-26B, reaching a planned 1,247 nautical miles (2,309 km; 1,435 mi). AM-5 also carried the real nose cone design, which separated from the rocket body, spun up the warhead, and separated to allow the warhead to continue on its own. The warhead section was equipped with a parachute and was recovered by the Navy some 28 nautical miles (52 km; 32 mi) from its predicted splashdown point.

AM-6B included both the production nose cone and the ST-90 INS during its launch from LC-26B on 17 July 1958. This time the Navy recovered it only 1.5 nautical miles (2.8 km; 1.7 mi) from its planned splashdown point 1,241 nautical miles (2,298 km; 1,428 mi) downrange. AM-7 flew 1,207 nautical miles (2,235 km; 1,389 mi) on 27 August, testing a new solid fuel rocket for spinup, replacing the older hydrogen peroxide model. AM-9 was launched on 10 October, the first Jupiter to carry the fully functional turbine exhaust roll control system. The flight failed however; a pinhole leak in the thrust transducer area started a thrust section fire and loss of vehicle control. The missile tumbled and broke up at T+49 seconds.

Afterwards, there was only one more failure in the Jupiter program, AM-23 on 15 September 1959, which developed a leak in a nitrogen bottle that led to depressurization of the RP-1 tank and almost immediate loss of control at liftoff. The missile wobbled from side to side and the RP-1 tank began to break apart starting at T+7 seconds. The Jupiter flipped upside down, dumping out the contents of the RP-1 tank, followed by total vehicle breakup at T+13 seconds, just before the Range Safety Officer could issue the flight termination command. Flying debris struck and damaged a Juno II on the adjacent LC-5. This particular launch was carrying a biological nose cone with mice and other specimens (which did not survive).

Through the early 1960s, a number of Jupiters were launched by the forces of other countries, as well as the Air Force, as part of ongoing combat training. The last launch of this sort was by the Italian Air Force, CM-106, which took place from LC-26B on 23 January 1963.

=== Biological flights ===
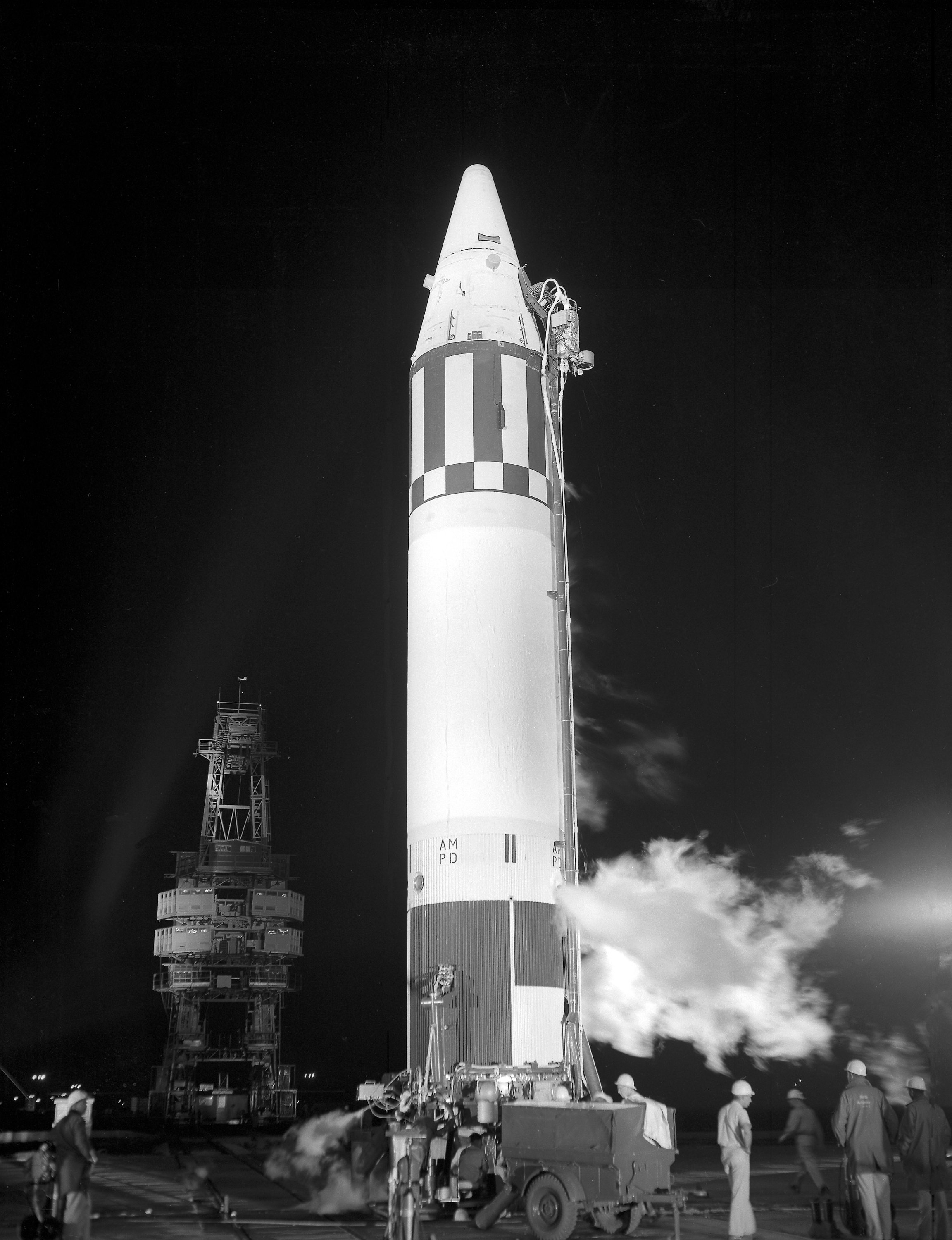
Jupiter AM-18 pre-launch

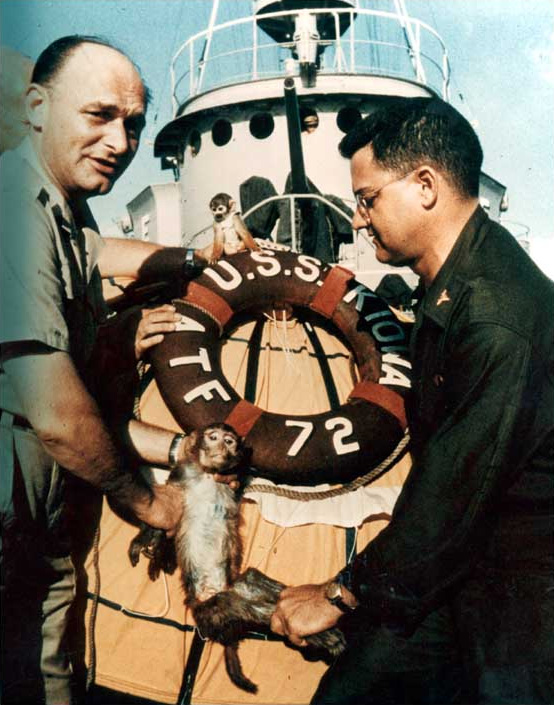
Able and Baker, the first two primates who survived space travel aboard Jupiter AM-18.

Jupiter missiles were used in a series of suborbital biological test flights. On 13 December 1958, Jupiter AM-13 was launched from Cape Canaveral, Florida with a Navy-trained South American squirrel monkey named Gordo on board. The nose cone recovery parachute failed to operate and Gordo did not survive the flight. Telemetry data sent back during the flight showed that the monkey survived the 10 g (100 m/s^{2}) of launch, eight minutes of weightlessness and 40 g (390 m/s^{2}) of reentry at 10,000 mph (4.5 km/s). The nose cone sank 1,302 nautical miles (2,411 km) downrange from Cape Canaveral and was not recovered.

Another biological flight was launched on 28 May 1959. Aboard Jupiter AM-18 were a 7 lb (3.2 kg) American-born rhesus monkey, Able, and an 11 oz (310 g) South American squirrel monkey, Baker. The monkeys rode in the nose cone of the missile to an altitude of 300 miles (480 km) and a distance of 1,500 miles (2,400 km) down the Atlantic Missile Range from Cape Canaveral. They withstood accelerations of 38 g (370 m/s^{2}) and were weightless for about nine minutes. A top speed of 10,000 mph (4.5 km/s) was reached during their 16-minute flight.

After splashdown the Jupiter nosecone carrying Able and Baker was recovered by the seagoing tug USS Kiowa (ATF-72). The monkeys survived the flight in good condition. Able died four days after the flight from a reaction to anesthesia while undergoing surgery to remove an infected medical electrode. Baker lived for many years after the flight, finally succumbing to kidney failure on 29 November 1984 at the United States Space and Rocket Center in Huntsville, Alabama.

=== Mercury-Jupiter ===
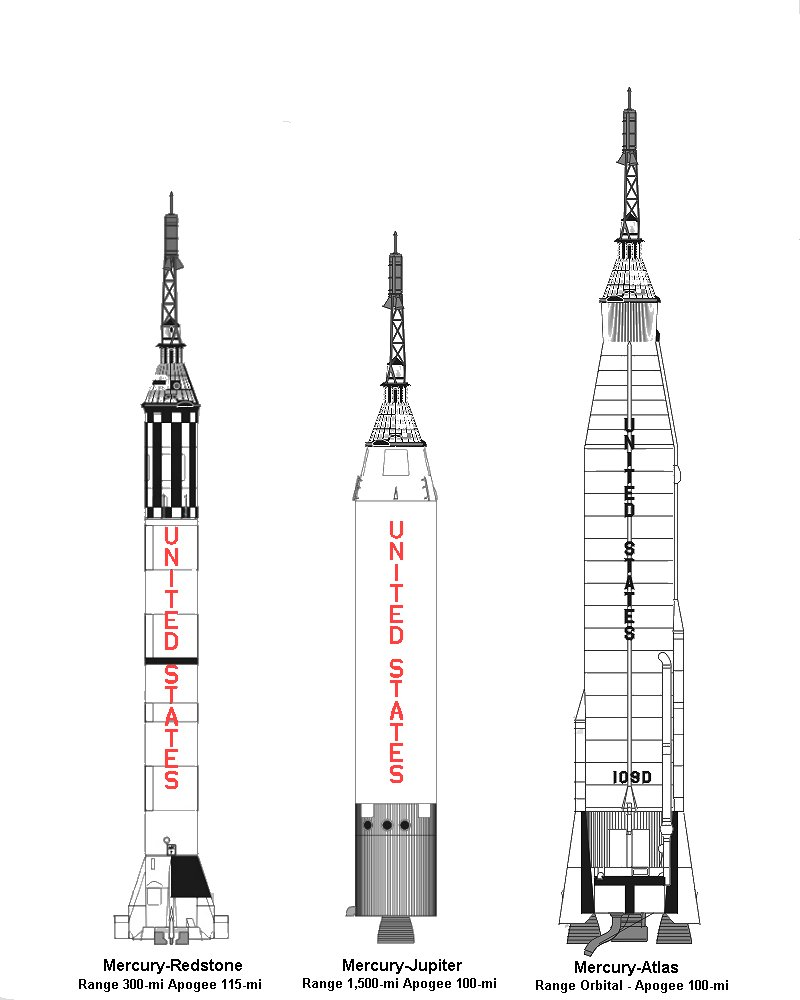
Mercury-Jupiter (center) compared with Redstone (left) and Atlas (right). Mercury-Jupiter was a proposal, and not launched.

Mercury-Jupiter was a proposed suborbital launch configuration consisting of a Jupiter missile carrying a Mercury capsule. Two flights were planned in support of Project Mercury. On July 1, 1959, less than a year after the October, 1958 program start date, the flights were canceled due to budget constraints. The MJ-1 flight would have been a heat shield test. The MJ-2 flight was planned as a maximum dynamic pressure qualification test of the production Mercury spacecraft with a chimpanzee on board.

== Operational deployment ==
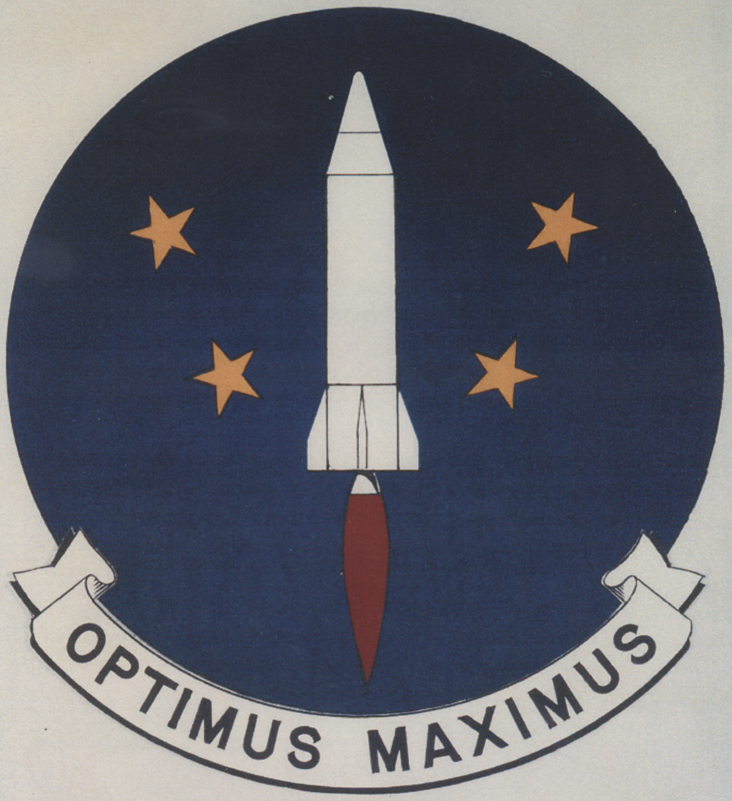
864th SMS insignia

In April 1958, under the command of President Eisenhower, the U.S. Department of Defense notified the Air Force it had tentatively planned to deploy the first three Jupiter squadrons (45 missiles) in France. However, in June 1958 the new French President Charles de Gaulle refused to accept basing any Jupiter missiles in France. This prompted U.S. to explore the possibility of deploying the missiles in Italy and Turkey. The Air Force was already implementing plans to base four squadrons (60 missiles) under Project Emily —subsequently redefined as 20 Royal Air Force squadrons each with three missiles—of PGM-17 Thor IRBMs in Britain on airfields stretching from Yorkshire to East Anglia.

In 1958, the United States Air Force activated the 864th Strategic Missile Squadron at ABMA. Although the USAF briefly considered training its Jupiter crews at Vandenberg AFB, California, it later decided to conduct all of its training at Huntsville. In June and September of the same year the Air Force activated two more squadrons, the 865th and 866th.

In April 1959, the secretary of the Air Force issued implementing instructions to USAF to deploy two Jupiter squadrons to Italy. The two squadrons, totaling 30 missiles, were deployed at 10 sites in Italy from 1961 to 1963. They were operated by Italian Air Force crews, but USAF personnel controlled arming the nuclear warheads. The deployed missiles were under command of 36th Strategic Interdiction Air Brigade (36ª Aerobrigata Interdizione Strategica, Italian Air Force) at Gioia del Colle Air Base, Italy.

In October 1959, the location of the third and final Jupiter MRBM squadron was settled when a government-to-government agreement was signed with Turkey. The U.S. and Turkey concluded an agreement to deploy one Jupiter squadron on NATO's southern flank. One squadron totaling 15 missiles was deployed at five sites near İzmir, Turkey from 1961 to 1963, operated by USAF personnel, with the first flight of three Jupiter missiles turned over to the Türk Hava Kuvvetleri (Turkish Air Force) in late October 1962, but USAF personnel retaining control of nuclear warhead arming.

On four occasions between mid-October 1961 and August 1962, Jupiter mobile missiles carrying 1.4 megatons of TNT (5.9 PJ) nuclear warheads were struck by lightning at their bases in Italy. In each case, thermal batteries were activated, and on two occasions, tritium-deuterium "boost" gas was injected into the warhead pits, partially arming them. After the fourth lightning strike on a Jupiter MRBM, the USAF placed protective lightning strike-diversion tower arrays at all of the Italian and Turkish Jupiter MRBM missiles sites.

In 1962, a Bulgarian MiG-17 reconnaissance airplane was reported to have crashed into an olive grove near one of the U.S. Jupiter missile launch sites in Italy, after overflying the site.

By the time the Turkish Jupiters had been installed, the missiles were already largely obsolete and increasingly vulnerable to Soviet attacks. All Jupiter MRBMs were removed from service by April 1963, as a backdoor trade with the Soviets in exchange for their earlier removal of MRBMs from Cuba.

=== Deployment sites ===
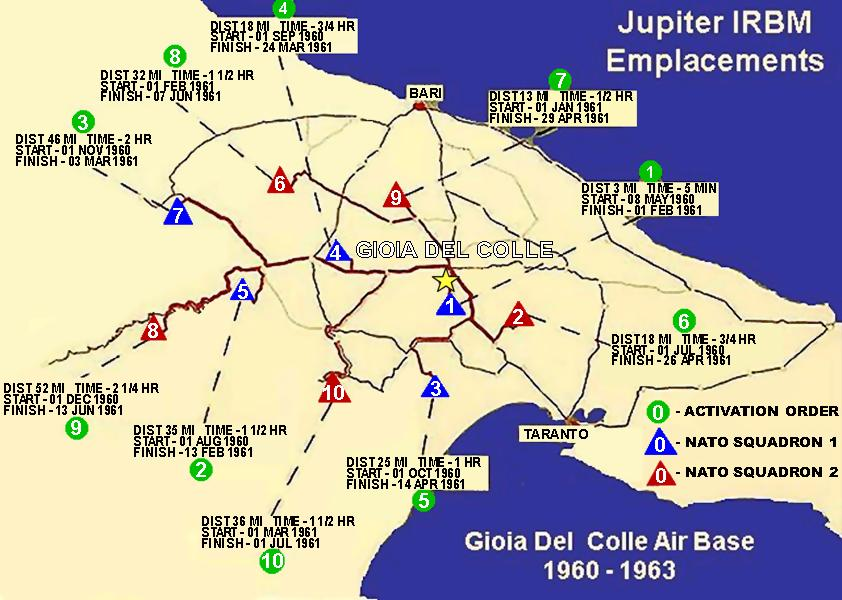
Deployment locations for Jupiter missiles in Italy from 1961 to 1963

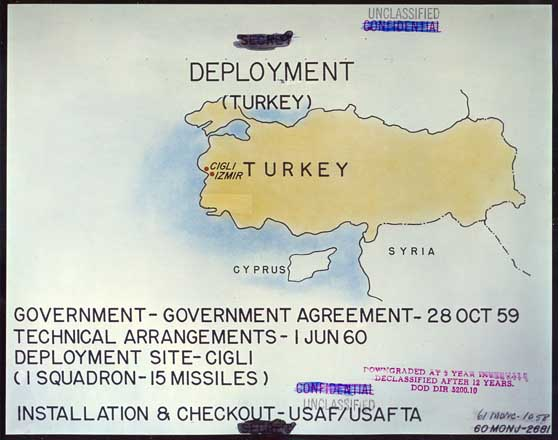
Jupiter Missile deployment in Turkey, 1959-1960

United States

Redstone Arsenal, Huntsville, Alabama:

- 34°37′58.11″N 86°39′56.40″W

White Sands Missile Range, New Mexico:

- 32°52′47.45″N 106°20′43.64″W

Republic of Italy

Headquarters: Gioia del Colle Air Base, the launch sites (built in a triangular configuration) were in the direct vicinity of the villages Acquaviva delle Fonti, Altamura (two sites), Gioia del Colle, Gravina in Puglia, Laterza, Mottola, Spinazzola, Irsina and Matera:

- Training Pad 40°47′6.74″N 16°55′33.5″E

Squadron 1:

- Site 1 40°44′24.59″N 16°55′58.83″E
- Site 3 40°35′42.00″N 16°51′33.00″E
- Site 4 40°48′47.05″N 16°22′53.08″E
- Site 5 40°45′32.75″N 16°22′53.08″E
- Site 7 40°57′43.98″N 16°10′54.66″E

Squadron 2:

- Site 2 40°40′42.00″N 17°6′12.03″E
- Site 6 40°58′6.10″N 16°30′22.73″E
- Site 8 40°42′14.98″N 16°8′28.42″E
- Site 9 40°55′23.40″N 16°48′28.54″E
- Site 10 40°34′59.77″N 16°35′43.26″E

Turkish Republic

Headquarters: Çiğli Air Base:

- Training Pad 38°31′17.32″N 27°1′3.89″E
- Site 1 38°42′26.68″N 26°53′4.13″E
- Site 2 38°42′23.76″N 27°53′57.66″E
- Site 3 38°50′37.66″N 27°02′55.58″E
- Site 4 38°44′15.13″N 27°24′51.46″E
- Site 5 38°47′30.73″N 27°42′28.94″E

== Description ==
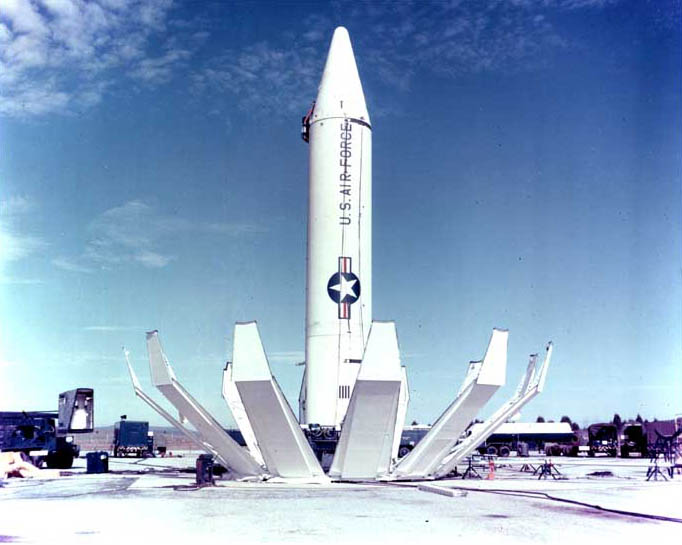
Jupiter with its "petal" cover open.

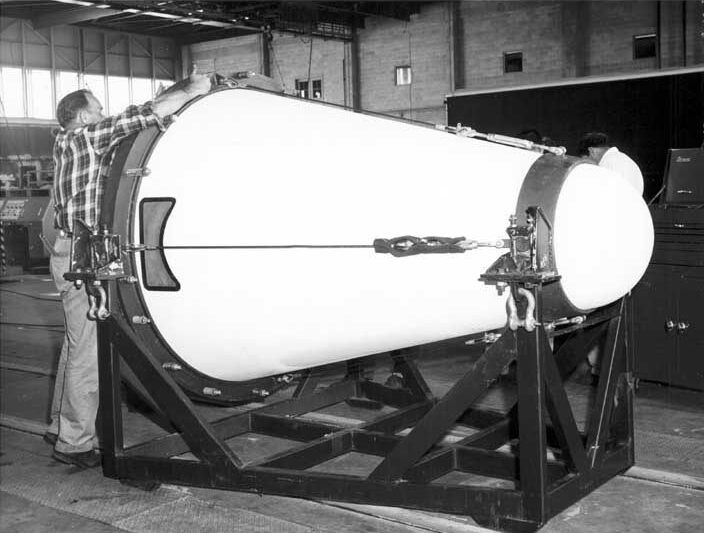
Jupiter was designed in an era when nuclear weapons were still very large and heavy. Its large reentry vehicle is typical of missile designs of the 1950s.

Jupiter squadrons consisted of 15 missiles and approximately 500 military personnel with five "flights" of three missiles each, composed of five officers and 10 NCOs. To reduce vulnerability, the flights were located approximately 30 miles apart, with the triple launcher emplacements separated by a distance of several hundred miles.

The ground equipment for each emplacement was housed in approximately 20 vehicles; including two generator trucks, a power distribution truck, short- and long-range theodolites, a hydraulic and pneumatic truck and a liquid oxygen truck. Another trailer carried 6000 gallons of fuel and three liquid oxygen trailers each carried 4,000 US gallons (15,000 L; 3,300 imp gal).

The missiles arrived at the emplacement on large trailers; while still on the trailer, the crew attached the hinged launch pedestal to the base of the missile which was hauled to an upright position using a winch. Once the missile was vertical, fuel and oxidizer lines were connected and the bottom third of the missile was encased in a "flower petal shelter", consisting of wedge-shaped metal panels, allowing crew members to service the missiles in all weather conditions. Stored empty, on 15-minute combat status in an upright position on the launch pad, the firing sequence included filling the fuel and oxidizer tanks with 68,000 lb (31,000 kg) of LOX and 30,000 lb (14,000 kg) of RP-1, while the guidance system was aligned and targeting information loaded. Once the fuel and oxidizer tanks were full, the launch controlling officer and two crewmen in a mobile launch control trailer could launch the missiles.

Each squadron was supported by a receipt, inspection and maintenance (RIM) area to the rear of the emplacements. RIM teams inspected new missiles and provided maintenance and repair to missiles in the field. Each RIM area also housed 25 tons of liquid oxygen and nitrogen generating plants. Several times a week, tanker trucks carried the fuel from the plant to the individual emplacements.

== Specifications (Jupiter MRBM) ==
- Length: 60 ft (18.3 m)
- Diameter: 8 ft 9 in (2.67 m)
- Total Fueled Weight: 108,804 lb (49,353 kg)
- Empty Weight: 13,715 lb (6,221 kg)
- Oxygen (LOX) Weight: 68,760 lb (31,189 kg)
- RP-1 (kerosene) Weight: 30,415 lb (13,796 kg)
- Thrust: 150,000 lbf (667 kN)
- Engine: Rocketdyne LR79-NA (Model S-3D)
- ISP: 247.5 s (2.43 kN·s/kg)
- Burning time: 2 min. 37 sec.
- Propellant consumption rate: 627.7 lb/s (284.7 kg/s)
- Range: 1,500 mi (2,400 km)
- Flight time: 16 min 56.9 sec
- Cutoff velocity: 8,984 mph (14,458 km/h) – Mach 13.04
- Reentry velocity: 10,645 mph (17,131 km/h) – Mach 15.45
- Acceleration: 13.69 g (134 m/s^{2})
- Peak deceleration: 44.0 g (431 m/s^{2})
- Peak altitude: 390 mi (630 km)
- CEP 4,925 ft (1,500 m)
- Warhead: 1.45 Mt Thermonuclear W49 – 1,650 lb (750 kg)
- Fusing: Proximity and Impact
- Guidance: Inertial (Model ST-90)
- Nose Cone: 12.5-inch radius spherical tip, cone frustum, 65-inch base diameter

== Launch vehicle derivatives ==
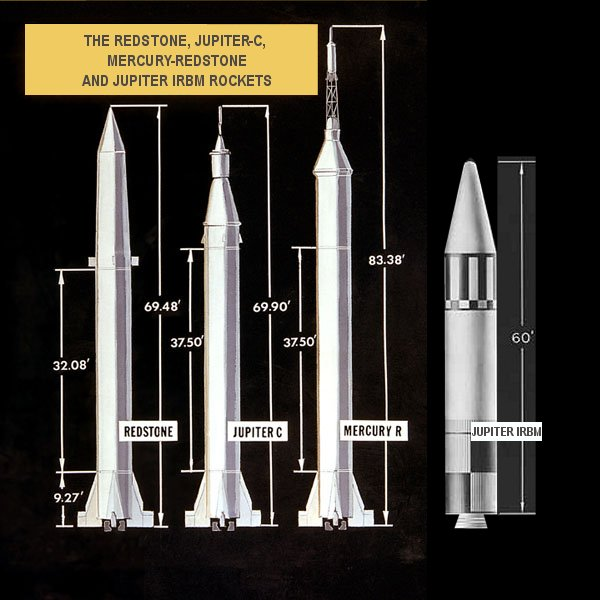
Illustration showing differences among Redstone, Jupiter-C, Mercury-Redstone, and Jupiter IRBM.

The Saturn I and Saturn IB rockets first stage was manufactured using the tooling from Jupiter and Redstone production, consisting of a central tank of the same diameter of the Jupiter missile with eight tanks of the same diameter as the Redstone clustered around it, all containing LOX/RP-1.

The Jupiter MRBM was also modified by adding upper stages, in the form of clustered Sergeant-derived rockets, to create a space launch vehicle called Juno II, not to be confused with the Juno I which was a Redstone-Jupiter-C missile development. There is also some confusion with another U.S. Army rocket called the Jupiter-C, which were Redstone missiles modified by lengthening the fuel tanks and adding small solid-fueled upper stages.

=== Specifications (Juno II launch vehicle) ===
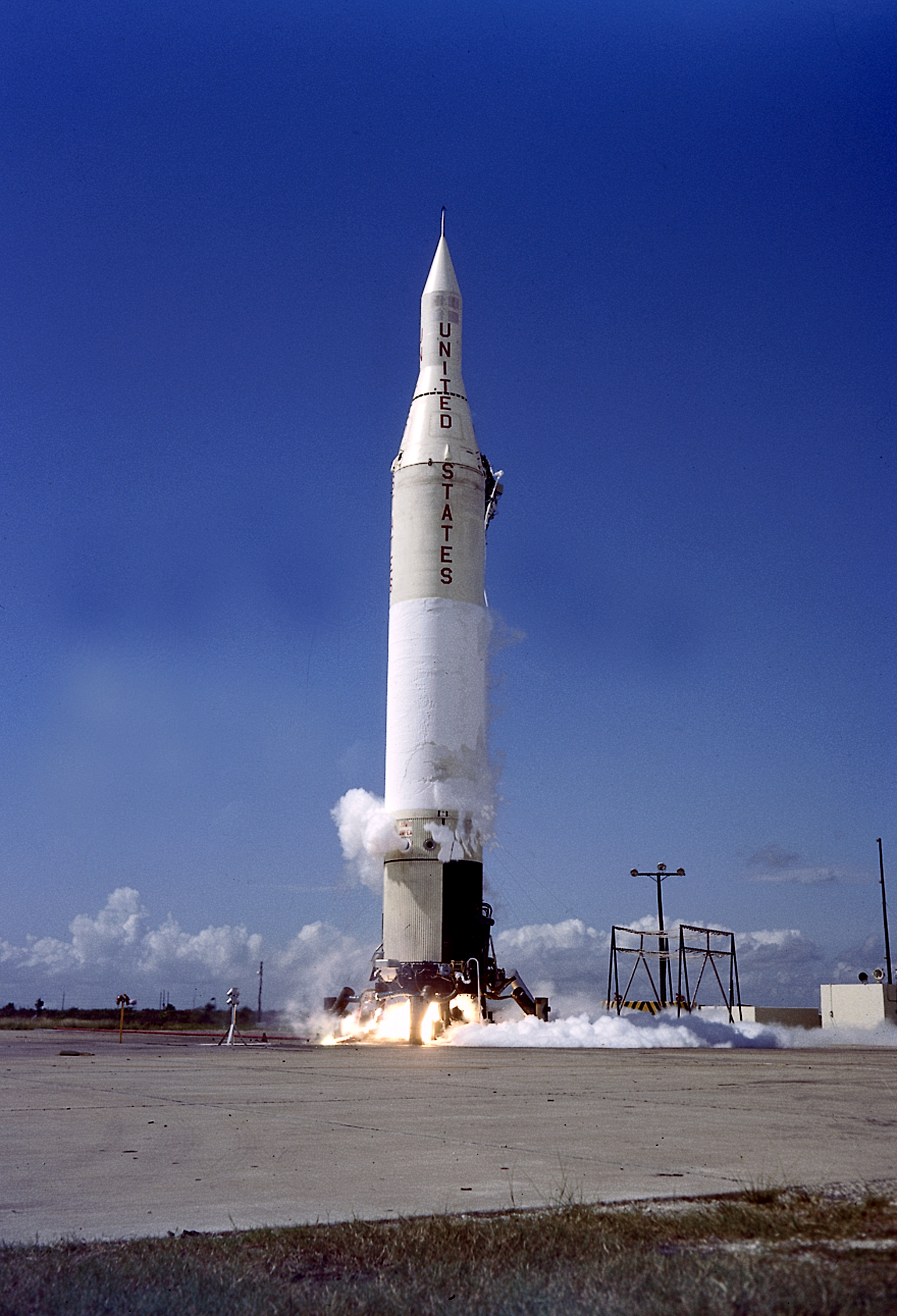
Juno II launch vehicle derived from Jupiter IRBM mobile missile.

The Juno II was a four-stage rocket derived from the Jupiter IRBM. It was used for 10 satellite launches, six of which failed. It launched Pioneer 3 (a partial success), Pioneer 4, Explorer 7, Explorer 8, and Explorer 11.

- Juno II total length: 24.0 m
- Orbit payload to 200 km: 41 kg
- Escape velocity payload: 6 kg
- First launch date: 6 December 1958
- Last launch date: 24 May 1961

Parameter	First stage	Second stage	Third stage	Fourth stage
Gross mass	54,431 kg	462 kg	126 kg	42 kg
Empty mass	5,443 kg	231 kg	63 kg	21 kg
Thrust	667 kN	73 kN	20 kN	7 kN
Isp	248 s (2.43 kN·s/kg)	214 s (2.10 kN·s/kg)	214 s (2.10 kN·s/kg)	214 s (2.10 kN·s/kg)
Burn time	182 s	6 s	6 s	6 s
Length	18.28 m	1.0 m	1.0 m	1.0 m
Diameter	2.67 m	1.0 m	0.50 m	0.30 m
Engine:	Rocketdyne S-3D	Eleven Sergeants	Three Sergeants	One Sergeant
Propellant	LOX/RP-1	Solid Fuel	Solid Fuel	Solid fuel

== Jupiter MRBM and Juno II launches ==
There were 46 test launches, all launched from Cape Canaveral Missile Annex, Florida.

=== 1957 ===
Date/Time (UTC)	Rocket	S/N	Launch site	Payload	Function	Orbit	Outcome	Remarks
1957-03-01	Jupiter	AM-1A	CCAFS LC-5		Missile test	Suborbital	Failure	First flight of Jupiter. Thrust section overheating led to control failure and missile breakup T+74 seconds.
1957-04-26	Jupiter	AM-1B	CCAFS LC-5		Missile test	Suborbital	Failure	Propellant slosh led to control failure and missile breakup T+93 seconds.
1957-05-31	Jupiter	AM-1	CCAFS LC-5		Missile test	Suborbital	Success	
1957-08-28	Jupiter	AM-2	CCAFS LC-26A		Missile test	Suborbital	Success	
1957-10-23	Jupiter	AM-3	CCAFS LC-26B		Missile test	Suborbital	Success	
1957-11-27	Jupiter	AM-3A	CCAFS LC-26B		Missile test	Suborbital	Failure	Turbopump failure caused loss of thrust T+101 seconds. Missile broke up T+232 seconds.
1957-12-19	Jupiter	AM-4	CCAFS LC-26B		Missile test	Suborbital	Failure	Turbopump failure caused loss of thrust T+116 seconds. Missile remained structurally intact until impact with the ocean.

=== 1958 ===
Date/Time (UTC)	Rocket	S/N	Launch site	Payload	Function	Orbit	Outcome	Remarks
1958-05-18	Jupiter	AM-5	CCAFS LC-26B		Missile test	Suborbital	Success	
1958-07-17	Jupiter	AM-6B	CCAFS LC-26B		Missile test	Suborbital	Success	
1958-08-27	Jupiter	AM-7	CCAFS LC-26A		Missile test	Suborbital	Success	
1958-10-10	Jupiter	AM-9	CCAFS LC-26B		Missile test	Suborbital	Failure	Hot exhaust gas leak caused thrust section fire and loss of control followed by vehicle breakup T+49 seconds.
1958-12-06	Juno II	AM-11	CCAFS LC-5	Pioneer 3	Lunar orbiter	High suborbital	Partial failure	Premature first stage cutoff
1958-12-13	Jupiter	AM-13	CCAFS LC-26B	Biological nose cone w/ squirrel monkey	Missile test	Suborbital	Partial failure	Parachute failed on payload, resulting in death of squirrel monkey occupant. Telemetry was received during the flight, and the squirrel monkey did survive launch and re-entry.

=== 1959 ===
Date/Time (UTC)	Rocket	S/N	Launch site	Payload	Function	Orbit	Outcome	Remarks
1959-01-22	Jupiter	CM-21	CCAFS LC-5		Missile test	Suborbital	Success	First flight of production Chrysler-built Jupiter
1959-02-27	Jupiter	CM-22	CCAFS LC-26B		Missile test	Suborbital	Success	
1959-03-03	Juno II	AM-14	CCAFS LC-5	Pioneer 4	Lunar orbiter	TEO	Success	First successful American lunar probe
1959-04-04	Jupiter	CM-22A	CCAFS LC-26B		Missile test	Suborbital	Success	
1959-05-07	Jupiter	AM-12	CCAFS LC-26B		Missile test	Suborbital	Success	
1959-05-14	Jupiter	AM-17	CCAFS LC-5		Missile test	Suborbital	Success	
1959-05-28	Jupiter	AM-18	CCAFS LC-26B	Biological nose cone	Missile test	Suborbital	Success	
1959-07-16	Juno II	AM-16	CCAFS LC-5	Explorer 6	Scientific	LEO	Failure	Electrical short in the guidance system caused loss of control at liftoff. RSO T+5 seconds.
1959-08-14	Juno II	AM-19B	CCAFS LC-26B	Beacon 2	Scientific	LEO	Failure	Premature first stage cutoff
1959-08-27	Jupiter	AM-19	CCAFS LC-5		Missile test	Suborbital	Success	
1959-09-15	Jupiter	AM-23	CCAFS LC-26B	Biological nose cone	Missile test	Suborbital	Failure	Pressure gas leak led to loss of control at liftoff. Missile self-destructed T+13 seconds.
1959-10-01	Jupiter	AM-24	CCAFS LC-6		Missile test	Suborbital	Success	
1959-10-13	Juno II	AM-19A	CCAFS LC-5	Explorer 7	Scientific	LEO	Success	
1959-10-22	Jupiter	AM-31	CCAFS LC-26A		Missile test	Suborbital	Success	
1959-11-05	Jupiter	CM-33	CCAFS LC-6		Missile test	Suborbital	Success	
1959-11-19	Jupiter	AM-25	CCAFS LC-26B		Missile test	Suborbital	Success	
1959-12-10	Jupiter	AM-32	CCAFS LC-6		Missile test	Suborbital	Success	
1959-12-17	Jupiter	AM-26	CCAFS LC-26B		Missile test	Suborbital	Success	

=== 1960 ===
Date/Time (UTC)	Rocket	S/N	Launch site	Payload	Function	Orbit	Outcome	Remarks
1960-01-26	Jupiter	AM-28	CCAFS LC-26B		Missile test	Suborbital	Success	
1960-03-23	Juno II	AM-19C	CCAFS LC-26B	Explorer	Scientific	LEO	Failure	Third stage failed to ignite
1960-10-20	Jupiter	CM-217	CCAFS LC-26A		Missile test	Suborbital	Success	
1960-11-03	Juno II	AM-19D	CCAFS LC-26B	Explorer 8	Scientific	LEO	Success	

=== 1961 ===
Date/Time (UTC)	Rocket	S/N	Launch site	Payload	Function	Orbit	Outcome	Remarks
1961-02-25	Juno II	AM-19F	CCAFS LC-26B	Explorer 10	Scientific	LEO	Failure	Third stage failed to ignite
1961-04-22	Jupiter	CM-209	CCAFS LC-26A		Missile test	Suborbital	Success	
1961-04-27	Juno II	AM-19E	CCAFS LC-26B	Explorer 11	Scientific	LEO	Success	
1961-05-24	Juno II	AM-19G	CCAFS LC-26B	Explorer 12	Scientific	LEO	Failure	Second stage failed to ignite. Final flight of Juno II
1961-08-05	Jupiter	CM-218	CCAFS LC-26A		Missile test	Suborbital	Success	
1961-12-06	Jupiter	CM-115	CCAFS LC-26A		Missile test	Suborbital	Success	

=== 1962 ===
Date/Time (UTC)	Rocket	S/N	Launch site	Payload	Function	Orbit	Outcome	Remarks
1962-04-18	Jupiter	CM-114	CCAFS LC-26A		Missile test	Suborbital	Success	
1962-08-01	Jupiter	CM-111	CCAFS LC-26A		Missile test	Suborbital	Success	

=== 1963 ===
Date/Time (UTC)	Rocket	S/N	Launch site	Payload	Function	Orbit	Outcome	Remarks
1963-01-22	Jupiter	CM-106	CCAFS LC-26A		Missile test	Suborbital	Success	Final flight of Jupiter

== Former operators ==
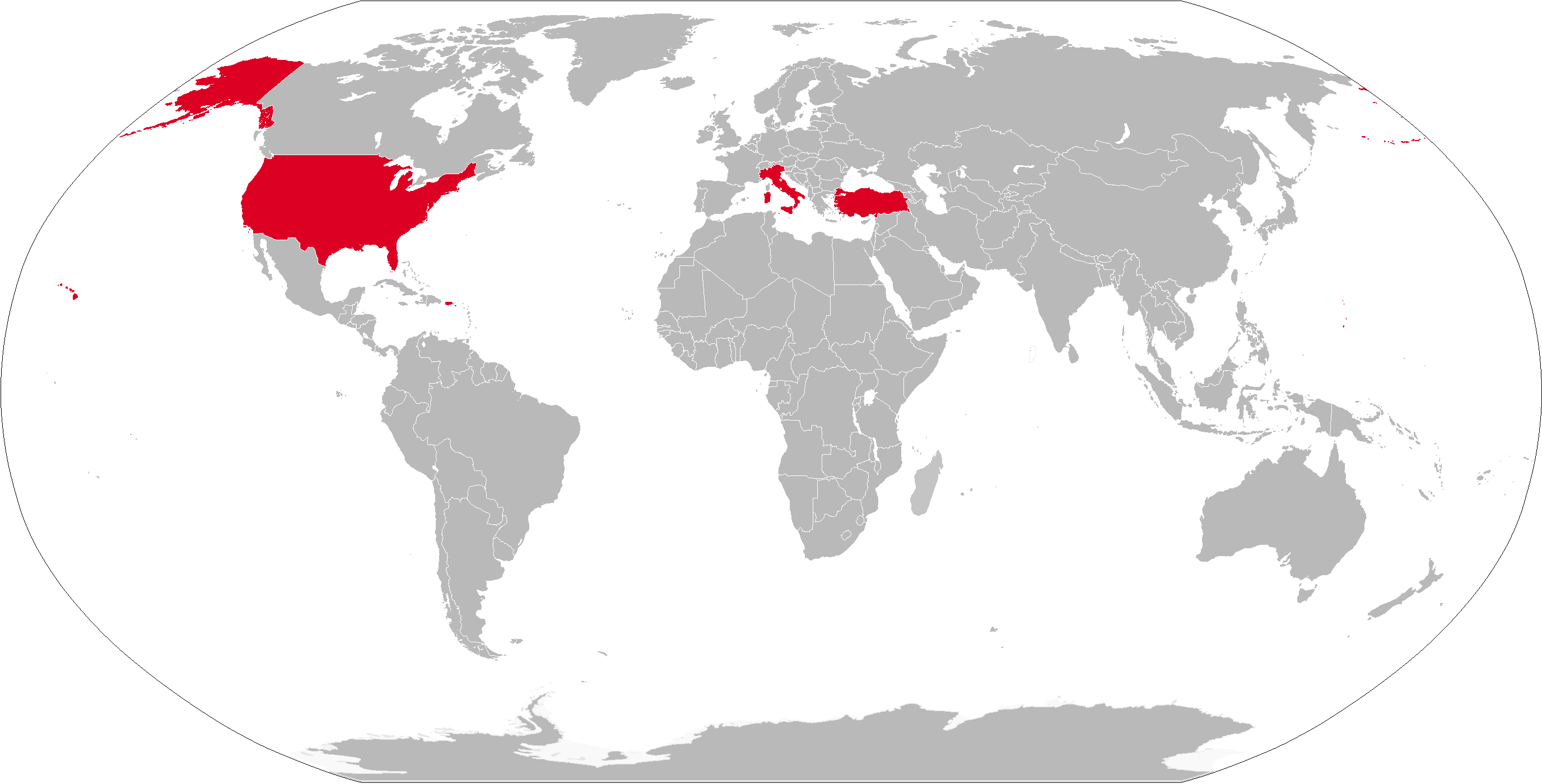
Map with former PGM-19 operators in red

United States
United States Air Force

- 864th Strategic Missile Squadron
- 865th Strategic Missile Squadron
- 866th Strategic Missile Squadron

Italy
Aeronautica Militare (Italian Air Force)

- 36ª Brigata Aerea Interdizione Strategica (36th Strategic Air Interdiction Brigade)

Turkey
Türk Hava Kuvvetleri (Turkish Air Force)

== Surviving examples ==
Some Jupiter and Juno II are on display:

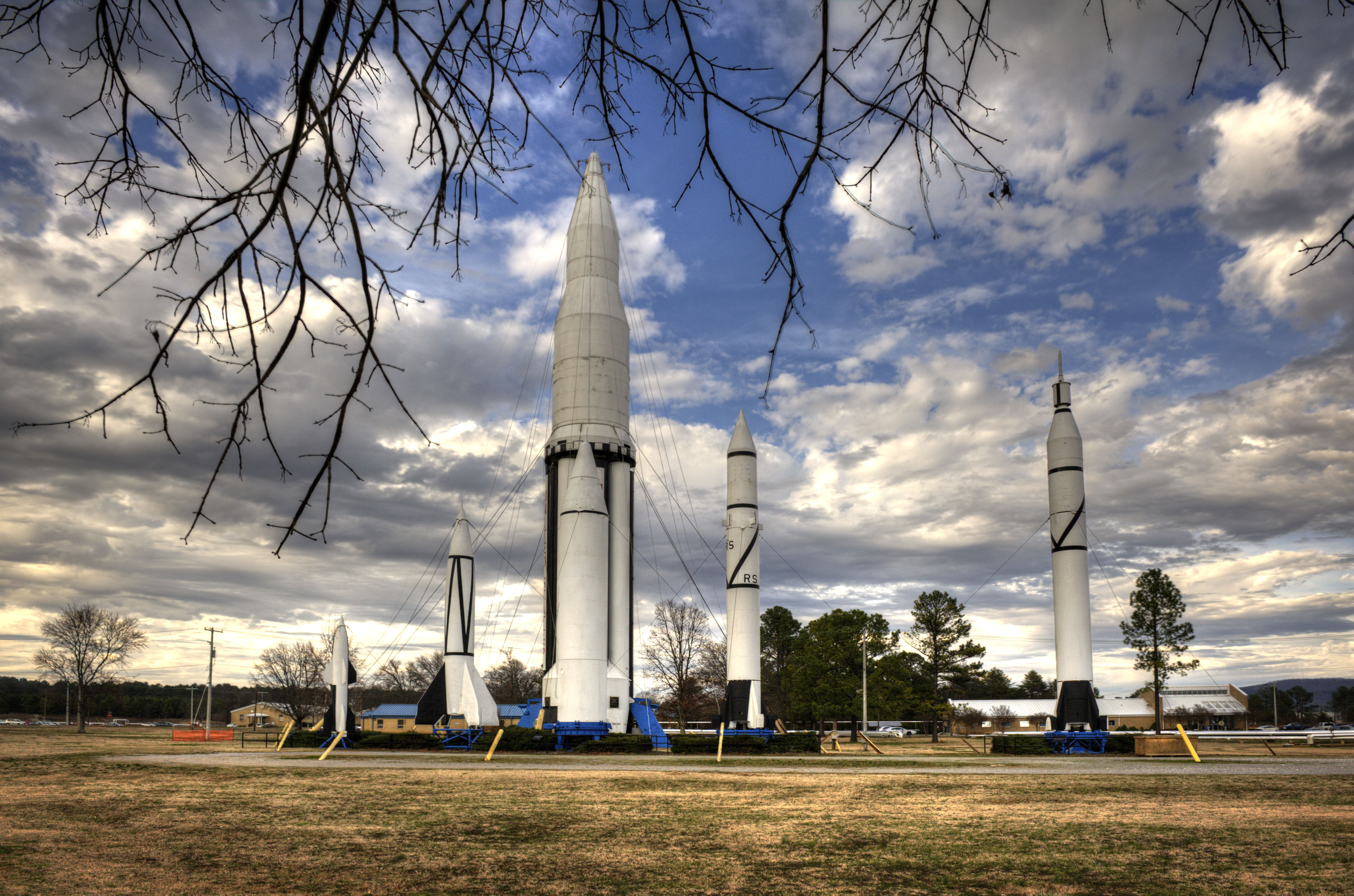
- PGM-19 Jupiter directly in front of a Saturn I, Marshall Space Flight Center
  The Marshall Space Flight Center in Huntsville, Alabama displays a Jupiter missile in its Rocket Garden.
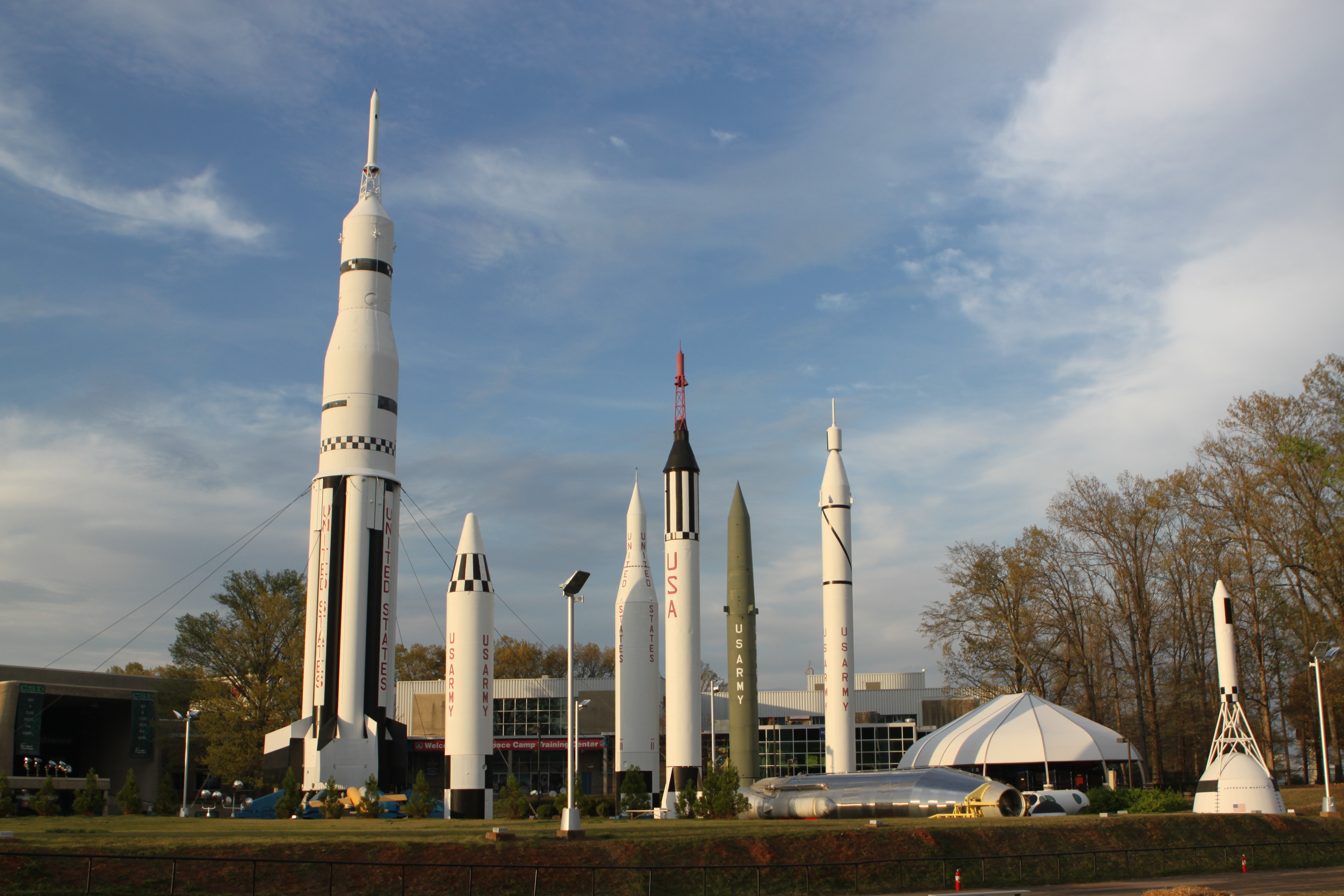
- Jupiter IRBM and Juno II (second and thirds from left) at the United States Space & Rocket Center
  The U.S. Space & Rocket Center in Huntsville, Alabama displays two Jupiters, including one in Juno II configuration, in its Rocket Park.
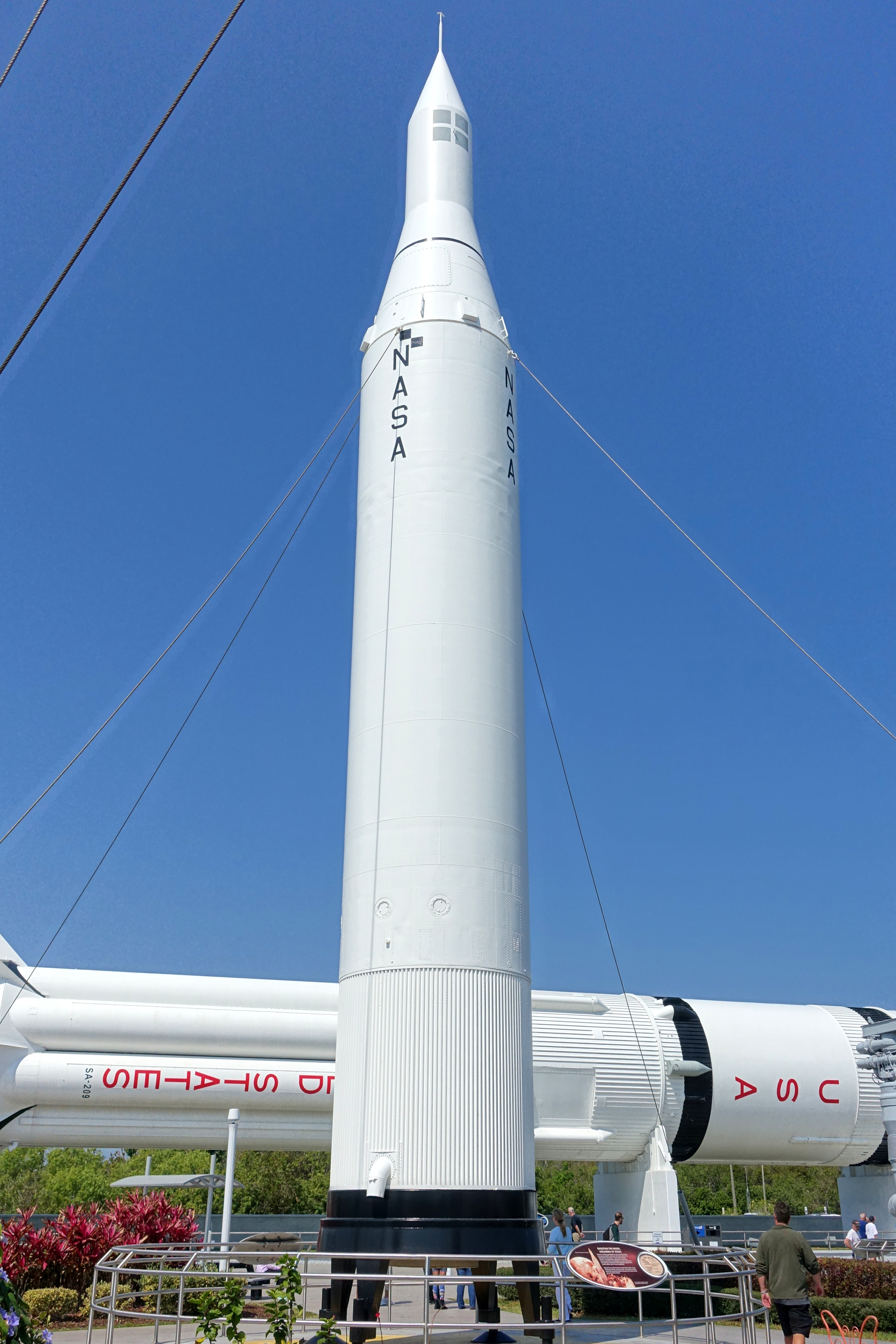
- Juno II at Kennedy Space Center
  A Jupiter (in Juno II configuration) is displayed in the Rocket Garden at Kennedy Space Center, Florida. It was damaged by Hurricane Frances in 2004, but was repaired and subsequently placed back on display.
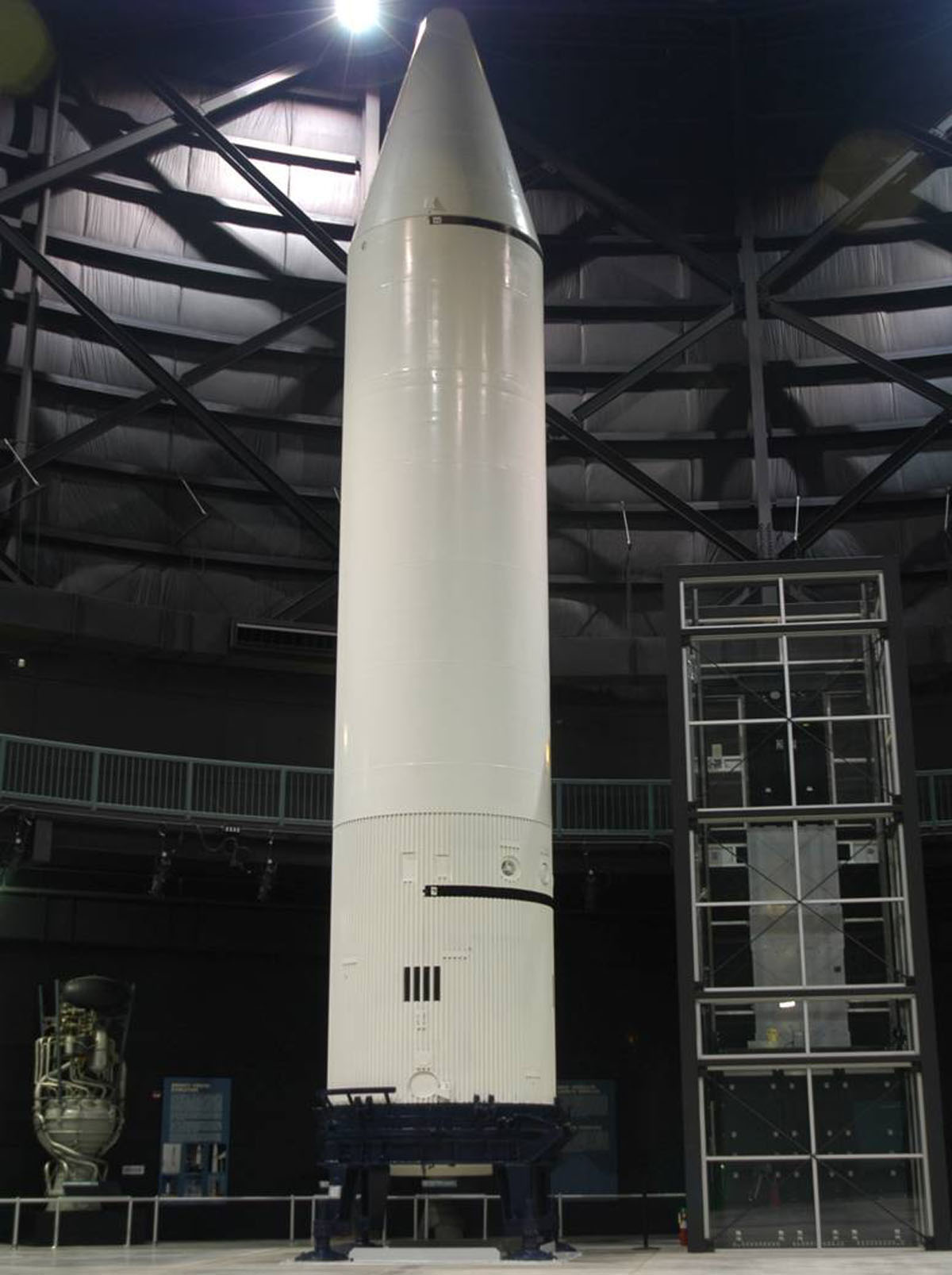
- PGM-19 Jupiter at the National Museum of the United States Air Force
  A PGM-19 is on display at the National Museum of the United States Air Force in Dayton, Ohio.
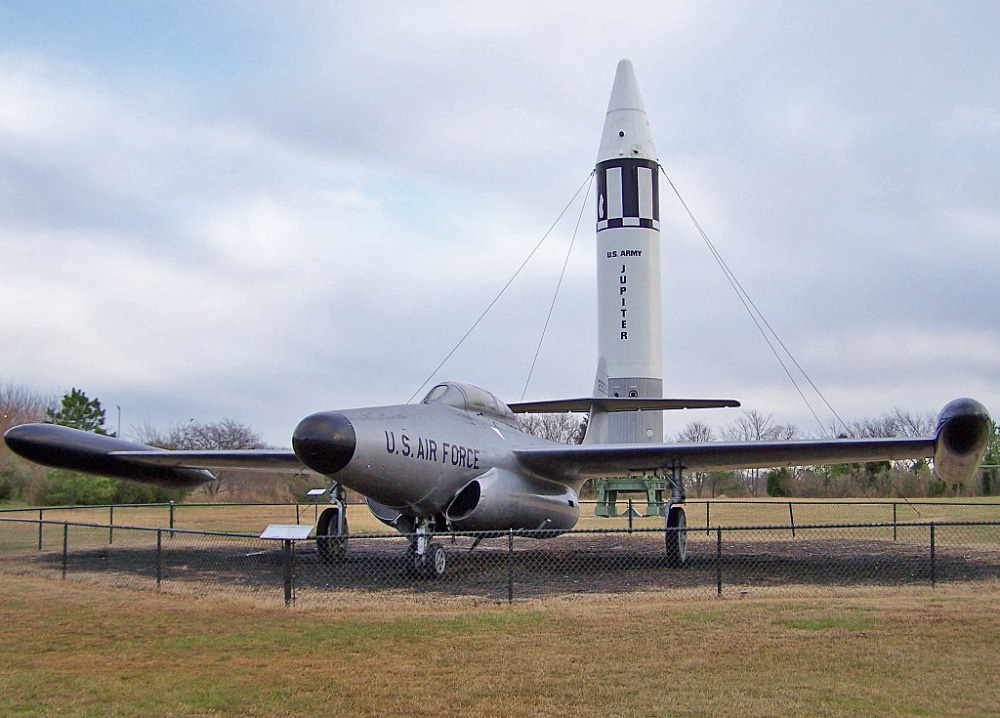
- SM-78 Jupiter at Air Power Park
  Air Power Park in Hampton, Virginia displays an SM-78.
- An SM-78/PMG-19 is on display at the Air Force Space & Missile Museum at Cape Canaveral, Florida. The missile had been present in the rocket garden for many years until 2009 when it was taken down and given a complete restoration. This pristine artifact is now in sequestered storage in Hangar R on Cape Canaveral AFS and cannot be viewed by the general public.
- A PGM-19 is on display at the South Carolina State Fairgrounds in Columbia, South Carolina. The missile, named Columbia, was presented to the city in the early 1960s by the US Air Force. It was installed at the fairgrounds in 1969 at a cost of $10,000.
- The Virginia Museum of Transportation in downtown Roanoke, Virginia displays a Jupiter PGM-19.
- The Frontiers of Flight Museum at Dallas Love Field in Dallas, Texas, has a Jupiter missile on display outdoors.

== See also ==
- List of United States Air Force missile squadrons
- List of missiles
- M-numbers
- Strategic Air Command
- Theatre ballistic missiles
