= Baghel (disambiguation) =

Baghelkhand is a region and a mountain range in central India.

Baghel may also refer to:

== People ==
=== Surname ===
- Bhupesh Baghel, politician of Chhattisgarh, India
- Dayaldas Baghel, Indian politician from Bharatiya Janata Party
- Pratibha Baghel, Indian film singer
- Ranjana Baghel, Indian politician from the Bharatiya Janata Party
- Rakesh Singh Baghel, Indian politician
- S. P. Singh Baghel, Indian politician from the Bharatiya Janata Party
- Sarika Devendra Singh Baghel, Indian politician from Rashtriya Lok Dal and Samajwadi Party
- Surendra Singh Baghel, Indian politician from Indian National Congress

=== Given name ===
- Baghel Singh, an 18th-century military general of the Sikh Empire of present-day India and Pakistan

== Places ==
- Ahirauli Baghel, a village in India
- Kasimpur Baghel, a village in Rahi block of Rae Bareli district, Uttar Pradesh, India
- Rampur Baghel, a village in Rahi block of Rae Bareli district, Uttar Pradesh
- Sirsi Baghel, a village in Mirzapur, Uttar Pradesh, India
- Mahalleh-ye Baghel, a village in Iran

== Other ==
- Baghel ministry, the Council of Ministers in 5th Chhattisgarh Legislative Assembly
- Bagheli language, an Indo-Aryan language of Baghelkhand

== See also ==
- Bagel (disambiguation)
- Vaghela (disambiguation)
