= Bagal =

Bagal may refer to:

- Bagal (surname), family name
- Bagal (caste), cattle herding caste of East India

== See also ==
- Bagel (disambiguation)
- Baghel (disambiguation)
