= Jupiter-A =

American test rocket

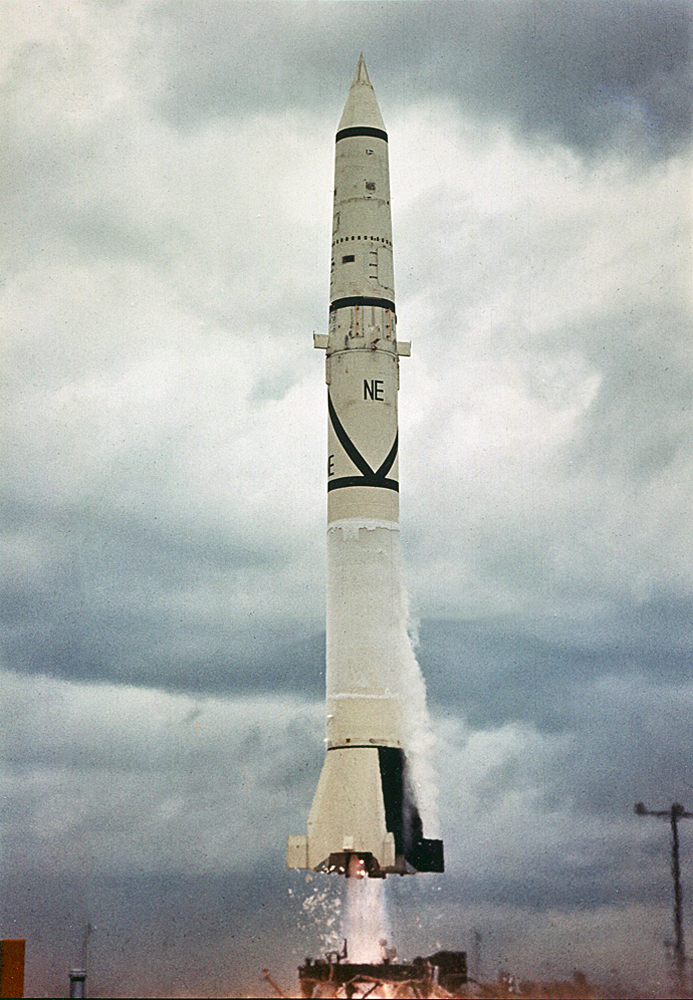
- Takeoff of Jupiter-A CC-39
- Manufacturer: Redstone Arsenal, Chrysler
- Country of origin: United States

Size
- Height: 69.50 feet (21.18 m)
- Diameter: 5.83 feet (1.78 m)
- Mass: 64,060 pounds (29,060 kg)
- Stages: 1

Capacity

Payload to Low Earth Orbit
- Mass: 11 kg (24 lb)

Launch history
- Status: Retired
- Launch sites: LC-5 and 6, Cape Canaveral Missile Annex, Florida
- Total launches: 25
- First flight: 1955-09-22
- Last flight: 1958-06-12

First stage – Redstone
- Powered by: 1 North American Aviation (Rocketdyne) 75-110 A-3, A-4, A-6
- Maximum thrust: 91,350 lbf; 406.33 kN (41,434 kgf)
- Specific impulse: 265 s (2.60 km/s)
- Burn time: 155 s
- Propellant: LOX/Ethanol, LOX/Hydyne

The Jupiter-A was an American sounding rocket and test vehicle derived from the Redstone ballistic missile, developed in the mid-1950s by Redstone Arsenal and Chrysler. It was the first variant of the Redstone to fly, and served as a testbed for components intended for use in the PGM-19 Jupiter medium-range ballistic missile (MRBM).

Components tested aboard Jupiter-A flights included the Redstone ST-80 inertial guidance platform, Jupiter angle-of-attack sensors, warhead fuzing systems, and explosive bolts. The vehicle stood 21.20 metres (69.6 ft) tall with a diameter of 1.78 metres (5.8 ft).

A total of twenty-five launches were conducted from Cape Canaveral Air Force Station, Florida, using Launch Complexes 5 and 6, between September 1955 and June 1958.

== Description ==
Jupiter-A was 21.20 metres (69.6 ft) tall, with a body diameter of 1.78 metres (5.8 ft) and fins extending 4 metres (13 ft) in height.

The first two flights, RS-11 and RS-12 (launched on September 22, 1955 and December 6, 1955), were powered by a Rocketdyne NAA 75-110 A-3 engine. Starting with Jupiter-A RS-18 on March 15, 1956 the A-4 rocket engine was used. From October 2, 1957 the A-6 engine was used (the A-5 version never entered service).

The rocket used a fuel consisting of 75% ethanol cut with 25% water and liquid oxygen as oxidizer. Jupiter-A RS-22 tested an A-4 rocket engine burning Hydyne as fuel, with a mixture of 60% UDMH and 40% DETA.

== Flight history ==
Twenty-five Jupiter-A launch attempts were made between 1955 and 1958 from Cape Canaveral, Florida.

Flight No.	Serial number	Launch date	Launch pad	Notes	Result
1	RS-11 / RS-HH	September 22, 1955	LC-6	First flight with full guidance system	Failure
2	RS-12 / RS-HU	December 6, 1955	LC-6	First flight successful with inertial guidance	Success
3	RS-18 / RS-HL	March 15, 1956	LC-6	The first launch of Jupiter A by the ABMA, a modified Redstone missile equipped with elements of the Jupiter IRBM's navigation and inertial control system.	Failure
4	RS-19 / RS-HE	May 16, 1956	LC-6		Failure
5	CC-13 / CC-HN	July 19, 1956	LC-5	First missile built by the Chrysler Corporation	Failure
6	RS-20 / RS-UX	August 8, 1956	LC-6		Success
7	CC-14 / CC-HT	October 18, 1956	LC-6		Success
8	RS-25 / RS-US	October 31, 1956	LC-6	Ground cutoff command given after 10 seconds of flight due to a yaw gyroscope malfunction.	Failure
9	RS-28 / RS-UL	November 14, 1956	LC-6	LEV-3 guidance system used instead of ST-80	Failure
10	CC-15 / CC-HS	November 29, 1956	LC-6		Success
11	RS-22 / RS-UU	December 19, 1956	LC-6	Hydyne fuel used	Failure
12	CC-16 / CC-HV	January 19, 1957	LC-6		Failure
13	RS-32	March 14, 1957	LC-6	First missile shipped directly from Chrysler to the test site	Failure
14	CC-30 / CC-NX	March 28, 1957	LC-6		Success
15	CC-31 / CC-NH	June 26, 1957	LC-6		Failure
16	CC-35 / CC-NS	July 12, 1957	LC-6		Success
17	CC-37 / CC-NI	July 26, 1957	LC-6		Success
18	CC-38 / CC-NL	September 11, 1957	LC-6		Failure
19	CC-39 / CC-NE	October 2, 1957	LC-6	First flight test of the Rocketdyne A-6 engine with a sea-level thrust of 78,000 lbf (350 kN).	Success
20	CC-41 / CC-TH	October 31, 1957	LC-6		Failure
21	CC-42 / CC-TU	December 11, 1957	LC-6	Hardtack adapter kit test	Success
22	CC-45 / CC-TS	January 15, 1958	LC-6	Hardtack gondola test	Success
23	CC-46 / CC-TV	February 12, 1958	LC-6	Hardtack adapter kit test	Success
24	CC-43 / CC-TN	February 27, 1958	LC-6		Success
25	CC-48 / CC-TL	June 11, 1958	LC-6		Failure

== Gallery ==
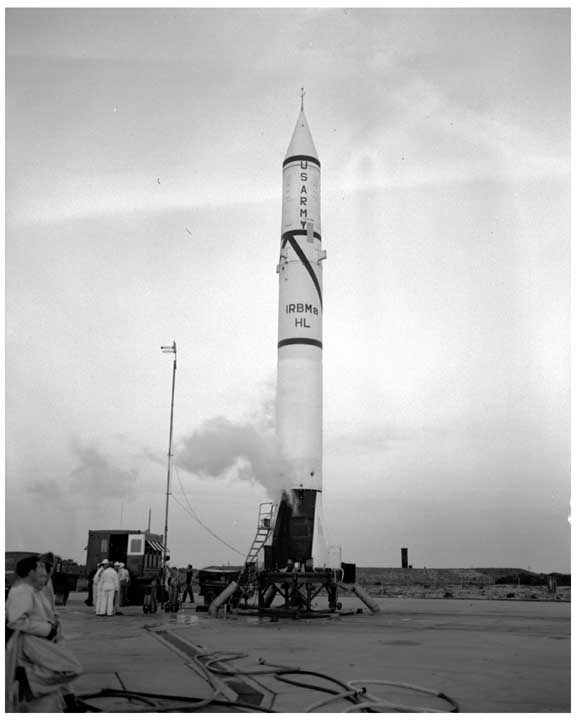
Jupiter-A RS-18, March 15, 1956

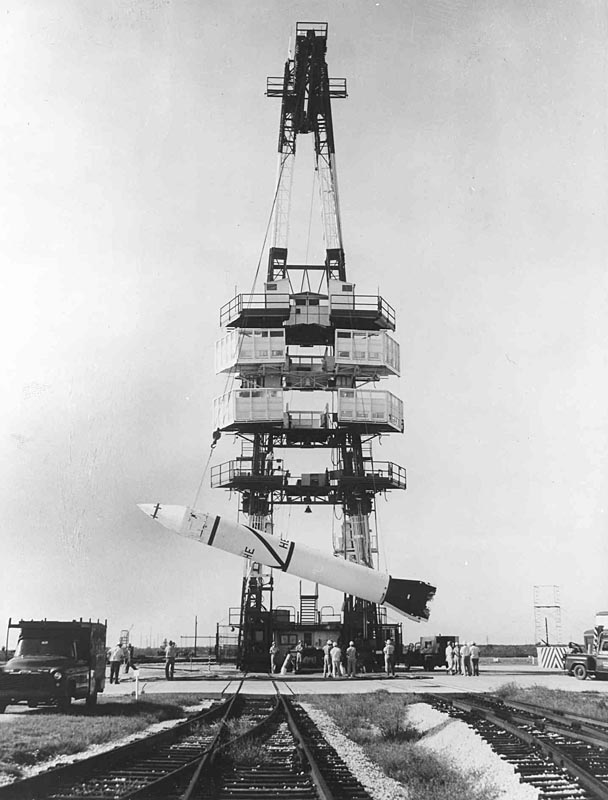
Jupiter-A RS-19, May 16, 1956

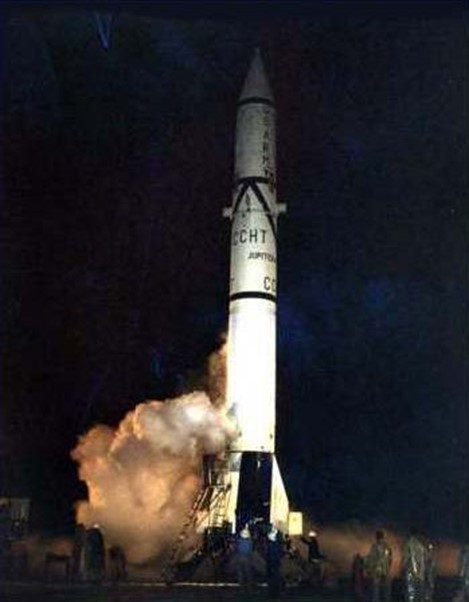
Jupiter-A CC-14, October 18, 1956

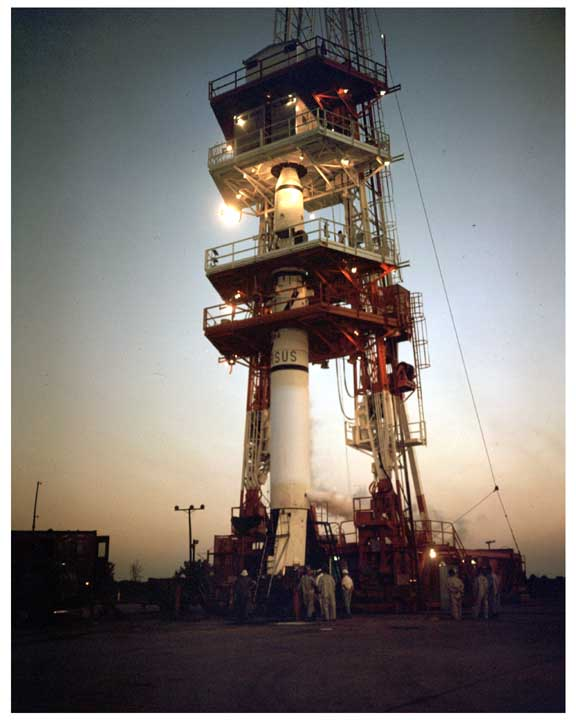
Jupiter-A RS-25, October 31, 1956

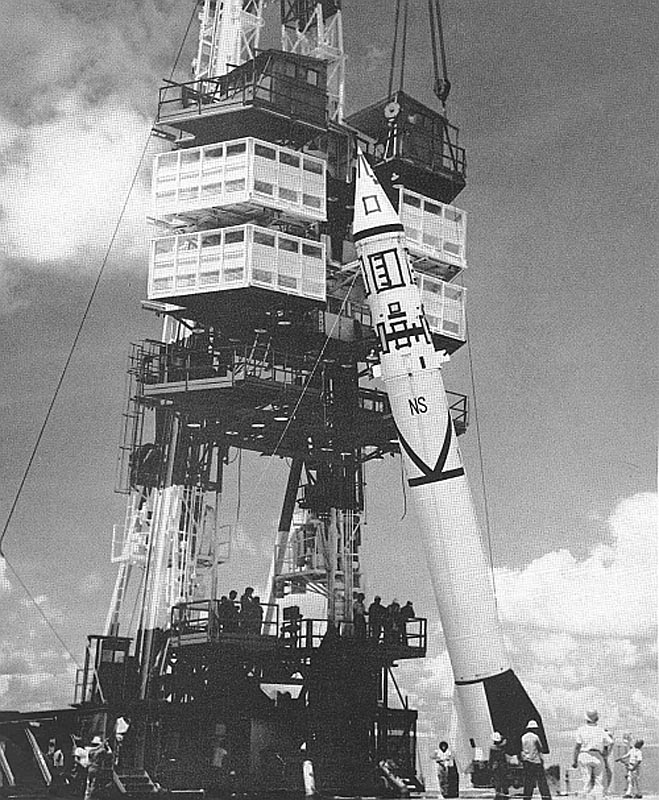
Jupiter-A CC-35, July 12, 1957

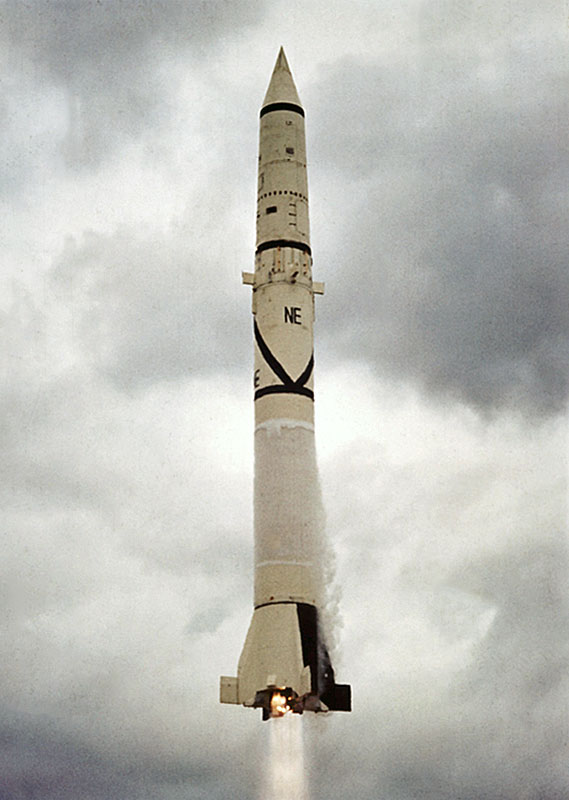
Jupiter-A CC-39, October 2, 1957

== See also ==
- Jupiter-C
- Juno I
