= Mary Sherman Morgan =

American rocket fuel scientist (1921–2004)

- Born: Mary Sherman; November 4, 1921; Ray, North Dakota, US
- Died: August 4, 2004 (aged 82)
- Education: Minot State
- Spouse: George Richard Morgan
- Engineering career
- Employers: Plum Brook Ordnance Works; North American Aviation
- Projects: Redstone rocket
- Significant design: Hydyne

Mary Sherman Morgan (November 4, 1921 – August 4, 2004) was an American rocket fuel scientist credited with the invention of the liquid fuel Hydyne in 1957, which powered the Jupiter-C rocket that boosted the United States' first satellite, Explorer 1.

== Early life and education ==
The second youngest of six siblings, Mary Sherman was born to Michael and Dorothy Sherman on their farm in Ray, North Dakota. She grew up in an impoverished farming household with bullying siblings and indifferent parents who kept her out of school to work on the farm. Social services stepped in and threatened to arrest Mary's father unless he allowed her to attend school. The social worker then provided her with riding lessons and a horse to attend her one-roomed school house. She hadn't attended any form of schooling until 9 years of age. In 1939, she graduated as her high school's valedictorian. From these accolades, she was awarded a scholarship for college. She then enrolled at DeSales College in Toledo, Ohio, as a chemistry major.

== Career ==
During Sherman's college education, the Second World War broke out. As a result of men going overseas to fight, the United States soon developed a shortage of chemists and other scientists. A local employment recruiter heard that Sherman had chemistry knowledge and offered her a job at a factory in Sandusky, Ohio. He would not tell her what product the factory made or what her job would be - only that she would be required to obtain a top secret security clearance. Short on money, she decided to take the job even though she would have to postpone her degree. The job turned out to be at the Plum Brook Ordnance Works munitions factory, charged with the responsibility of manufacturing explosives trinitrotoluene (TNT), dinitrotoluene (DNT), and pentolite. The site produced more than one billion pounds of ordnance throughout World War II.

Sherman became pregnant out of wedlock in 1943, a difficult dilemma in an era when such behavior was considered extremely shameful and women were often given back-alley abortions or hidden away from their friends and family. At that time, she was living with her first cousin, Mary Hibbard, in Huron, Ohio. In 1944, she gave birth to a daughter, Mary G. Sherman, whom she later gave up for adoption to Hibbard and her husband, Irving. The child was renamed Ruth Esther.

After spending the war years designing explosives for the military, she applied for a job at North American Aviation, and was employed in their Rocketdyne Division, based in Canoga Park, California. Soon after being hired, she was promoted to the role of Theoretical Performance Specialist, which required her to mathematically calculate the expected performance of new rocket propellants. Out of 900 engineers, she was the only woman, and one of only a few without a college degree. These were two main sources of prejudice she faced in her time at the company.

While working at North American Aviation, she met her future husband, George Richard "Red" Morgan, a Mechanical Engineer who had graduated from Caltech. Together, they had four children – George, Stephen, Monica, and Karen.

== Space race era ==
External videos
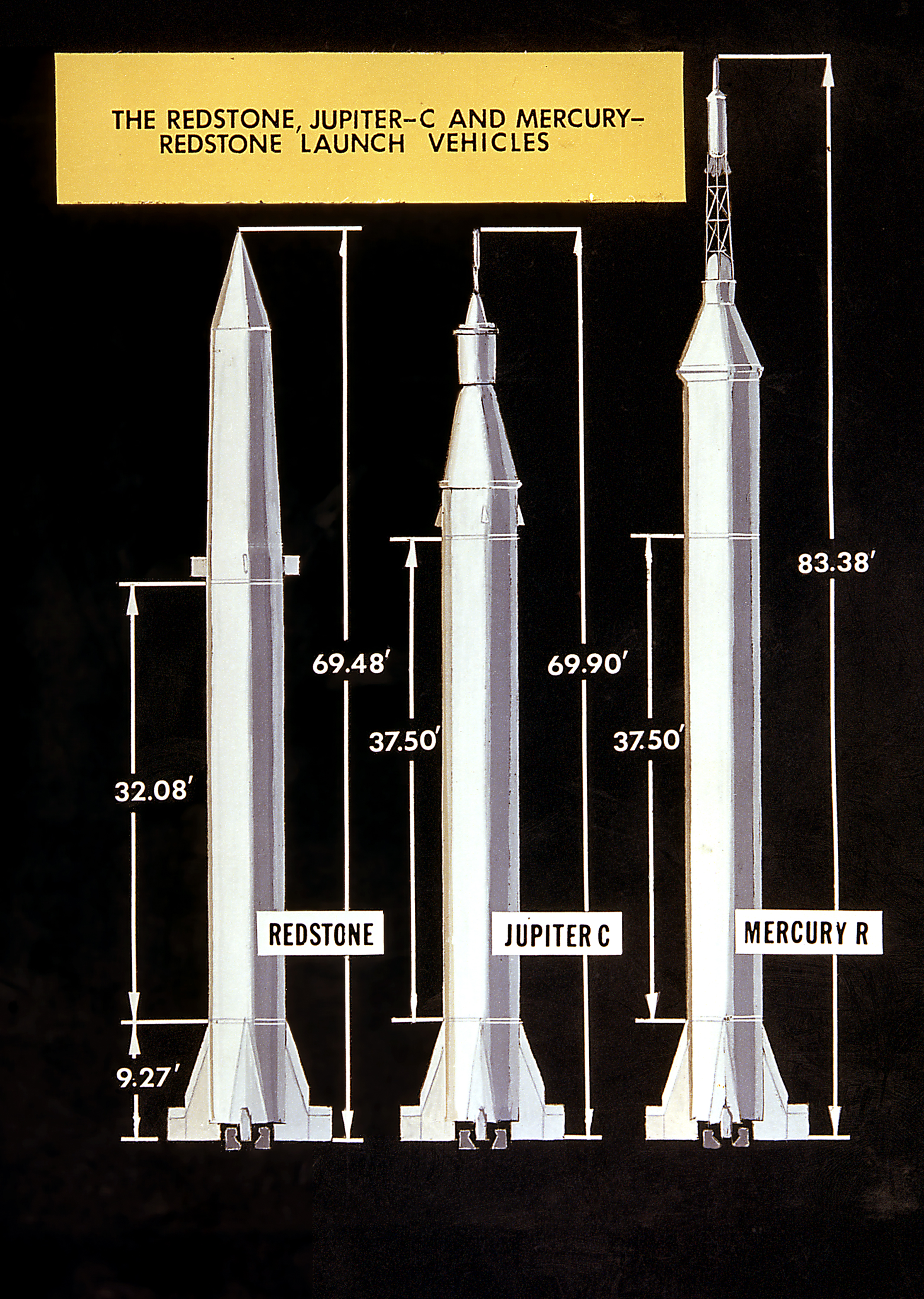
- “The Woman Who Saved the U.S. Space Race (And Other Unsung Scientists)”, Reactions

During the development program for the Jupiter missile, Wernher von Braun's team used modified Redstone missiles, dubbed the Jupiter C, to accelerate the rocket to orbital velocities. In order to improve the performance of the first stage, they awarded a contract to North American Aviation's Rocketdyne Division to come up with a more powerful fuel. The fuel needed to give extra power to the rocket while still maintaining the same engine design from the Army's Redstone missiles, a very difficult task. Her colleagues deemed it as being set up to fail.

Due to her expertise and experience, Morgan was assigned to lead a group of college interns at North American Aviation's Rocketdyne Division and their work resulted in the birth of a new propellant, Hydyne. The standard Redstone was fueled with a 75% ethyl alcohol solution, but the Jupiter-C first stage had used Hydyne fuel, a blend of 60% unsymmetrical dimethylhydrazine (UDMH) and 40% diethylenetriamine (DETA). This was a more powerful fuel than ethyl alcohol. The first Hydyne-powered Redstone R&D flight took place on 29 November 1956, and Hydyne subsequently powered three Jupiter C nose cone test flights.

In 1957, the Soviet Union and the United States had set a goal of placing satellites into Earth orbit as part of a worldwide scientific celebration, known as the International Geophysical Year. In this endeavor, the United States' effort was called Project Vanguard. The Soviet Union successfully launched the Sputnik 1 satellite on October 4, 1957, an event followed soon after by a very public and disastrous explosion of a Vanguard rocket. Until this point, the US had been operating with the assumption that they were technologically in the lead; the Soviet Union beating them to it was a source of embarrassment. Sputnik orbited for 21 days, showcasing its success, and in less than a month Sputnik 2 had also been launched. Political pressure forced U.S. politicians to allow von Braun, a former German rocket scientist, to prepare his Jupiter C rocket for an orbital flight. The renamed launcher (now called Juno I) put Explorer I into orbit on January 31, 1958. After the Jupiter C and six Juno I launches, the U.S. switched to new, more powerful fuels. Most of the credit for the Explorer 1 goes to von Braun, but would have not reached orbit without the Rocketdyne fuel innovation.

=== Proposed fuel name ===
As Hydyne-LOX (liquid oxygen) was the fuel combination used for the Redstone rocket, Morgan whimsically suggested naming her new fuel formulation "Bagel", since the rocket's propellant combination would then be called Bagel and Lox. However, this name was rejected by the U.S. Army.

== Death and legacy ==
Morgan died of chronic obstructive pulmonary disease (COPD) emphysema on August 4, 2004, at 82 years old, despite having quit her heavy smoking habit for Lent 29 years earlier. In July 2013, the BBC's online news magazine released a short video tribute to Morgan, narrated by her son, George.

Morgan was the subject of a semi-biographical stage play written by her son, George. The play, Rocket Girl, was produced by Theater Arts at California Institute of Technology (TACIT), directed by Brian Brophy, and was performed at the California Institute of Technology (Caltech) in Pasadena, California on November 17, 2008. Her son admitted that he knew surprisingly little about his mother's life and work when she died, as she worked in an industry connected to defense and national security, and was limited in what she could discuss. Due to her great avoidance of celebrity attention and status, she never did any interviews in her career or during retirement. She had erased herself from existence so much that when her son George Morgan tried to write an obituary in the Los Angeles Times following her 2004 death, there wasn’t enough information to verify her existence. The newspaper couldn’t publish it. George created a blog to learn more about his mother and collect as much information as he could. He had built and launched homemade rockets with friends in the Arizona desert, and as he recalled, "If I'd known how much expertise in rocketry my mother had, we could have asked her for help and saved ourselves a great deal of trouble." The play was later turned into a book by the same name. The book was released in 2013 titled Rocket Girl, and subtitled, “The Story of Mary Sherman Morgan, America’s First Female Rocket Scientist”. It was particularly hard to source information due to the secrecy of the Space Race and Cold War relations.

== Innovation: Hydyne ==
In the mid-1950s, the U.S. Army Ballistic Missile Agency needed to dramatically increase the performance of the Redstone missile. Its existing propellant mixture, ethyl alcohol and water, did not provide sufficient thrust to launch a satellite into orbit. Political pressure intensified after the Soviet Union successfully launched Sputnik, heightening the urgency to achieve an American orbital launch. Engineers were constrained by time: they could not redesign the Redstone engine, so the only hope was to improve its fuel (Ouellette, 2018).

Morgan was assigned to lead the development of a new propellant. She created Hydyne, a highly energetic blend of 60% unsymmetrical dimethylhydrazine (UDMH) and 40% diethylenetriamine (DETA). This formulation delivered a significant increase in specific impulse, which was approximately 10–12% more performance compared with the Redstone’s earlier fuel mixture (Ouellette, 2018). Hydyne allowed the Redstone-derived Jupiter-C and later Juno I launch vehicles to lift heavier upper stages and payloads. Its most famous use came on January 31, 1958, when a Juno I rocket powered by Hydyne launched Explorer 1, America’s first successful satellite (Dutfield, 2021; Demming, 2021).

== The Pain Point She Solved ==
The central engineering challenge was the performance ceiling of existing U.S. hardware. The United States needed a way to reach orbit without new engines, new tanks, or new rocket designs. Morgan’s innovation directly addressed this constraint by producing a fuel that was more energetic yet compatible with the Redstone’s existing infrastructure. Hydyne increased thrust, energy density, and combustion efficiency while remaining stable enough for operational use. Her work effectively allowed a missile designed for suborbital missions to perform like an orbital launch vehicle.
