= Explorer 2 =

1958 American failed space mission which attempted to place a satellite into orbit

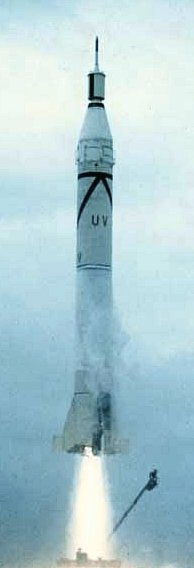
- Launch of Explorer 2 satellite
- Names: Explorer II
- Mission type: Earth science
- Operator: JPL / Army Ballistic Missile Agency
- Mission duration: Failed to orbit 120 days (planned)

Spacecraft properties
- Spacecraft: Explorer II
- Spacecraft type: Science Explorer
- Bus: Explorer 1
- Manufacturer: Jet Propulsion Laboratory
- Launch mass: 14.22 kg (31.3 lb)
- Dimensions: 203 cm (80 in) length 15.2 cm (6.0 in) diameter
- Power: 60 watts

Start of mission
- Launch date: 5 March 1958, 18:27:57 GMT
- Rocket: Juno I (RS-26)
- Launch site: Atlantic Missile Range, LC-26A
- Contractor: Army Ballistic Missile Agency

End of mission
- Destroyed: Failed to orbit

Orbital parameters
- Reference system: Geocentric orbit (planned)
- Regime: Medium Earth orbit
- Perigee altitude: 358 km (222 mi)
- Apogee altitude: 2,550 km (1,580 mi)
- Inclination: 32.24°
- Period: 114.80 minutes

Instruments
- Geiger counter Micrometeorite Detector; Satellite Drag Atmospheric Density; Resistance Thermometers; Thermometers

Explorer 2 was an American unmanned space mission within the Explorer program. Intended to be a repetition of the previous Explorer 1 mission, which placed a satellite into medium Earth orbit, the spacecraft was unable to reach orbit due to a failure in the launch vehicle during launch.

Explorer 2 was launched from Cape Canaveral Missile Test Center of the Atlantic Missile Range (AMR), LC-26A in Florida on 5 March 1958 at 18:27:57 GMT by a Juno I launch vehicle. The Juno I had its origins in the United States Army's Project Orbiter in 1954. The project was canceled in 1955 when the decision was made to proceed with Project Vanguard.

== Background ==
Following the launch of the Soviet Sputnik 1 on 4 October 1957, the Army Ballistic Missile Agency (ABMA) was directed to proceed with the launching of a satellite using the Juno I four-stage variant of the three-stage Jupiter-C, which had already been flight-tested in nose-cone re-entry tests for the Jupiter IRBM (intermediate-range ballistic missile). Working closely together, ABMA and Jet Propulsion Laboratory (JPL) completed the job of modifying the Jupiter-C and building Explorer 1 in 84 days.

== Spacecraft ==
Explorer 2 was identical to Explorer 1 except for the addition of a tape recorder designed to enable playback of data. The satellite was a 203 cm (80 in) long, 15.2 cm (6.0 in) diameter cylinder and nosecone that comprised the fourth stage of the Jupiter-C launch vehicle. With a mass of 14.22 kg (31.3 lb), it was about 0.25 kg (0.55 lb) heavier than Explorer 1. The spacecraft body was made of stainless AISI-410 steel, 0.058 cm (0.023 in) thick. The case was heat-oxidized to a gold color and eight alternate stripes of white Rokide A (flame sprayed aluminum oxide) were used for temperature control.

The base of the cylinder held the Sergeant solid-fuel rocket motor. The sub-carrier oscillators and Mallory mercury batteries for the low power transmitter were in the upper part of the nose cone. Below these was the low power (10 mW, 108.00 MHz) transmitter for the carrier and sub-carrier signals, which used the stainless steel satellite skin as a dipole antenna.

Below the nose cone was the detector deck, holding the Geiger-Mueller counter tube for the cosmic ray experiment, the command receiver, for recorder interrogations, high power playback transmitter (60 mW, 108.03 MHz) for interrogation response, cosmic ray experiment electronics, Mallory mercury batteries for the high power transmitter, and a 0.23 kg (0.51 lb), 5.7 cm (2.2 in) diameter magnetic tape recorder. An acoustic micrometeorite detector was mounted to the inside of the spacecraft cylinder near the cosmic ray device. Near the bottom of the detector deck four circularly polarized turnstile stainless steel wire whip antennas protruded radially from the side of the spacecraft, equally spaced around the axis. A gap for the high powered antenna and a heat radiation shield were between the payload and the rocket motor. The micrometeorite detectors were arranged in a ring around the cylinder near the bottom of the spacecraft. Four temperature gauges were mounted a various locations in the spacecraft.

Explorer 2 was equipped with a Geiger counter for the purposes of detecting cosmic rays. After Explorer 3, it was decided that the original Geiger counter had been overwhelmed by strong radiation coming from a belt of charged particles trapped in space by the Earth's magnetic field (see: Van Allen radiation belt). Explorer 2 was also equipped with a wire grid array and an acoustic detector for the purpose of micrometeorite detection.

== Instruments ==
=== Geiger counter ===
An Anton 314 omnidirectional Geiger tube detector was used to measure the flux of energetic charged particles (protons E>30 MeV and electrons E>3 MeV). The instrument consisted of a single Geiger-Mueller tube, a scaling circuit to reduce the number of pulses, and a telemetry system to transmit the data to ground receiving stations. The Geiger-Mueller tube was a type 314 Anton halogen quenched counter with stainless steel (approximately 75% iron, 25% chromium) wall of approximately 0.12 cm (0.047 in) thickness. The instrument was mounted within the spacecraft hull, which had 0.58 mm (0.023 in) thick stainless steel walls. The counter was 10.2 cm (4.0 in) long by 2.0 cm (0.79 in) diameter and the internal wire was 10 cm (3.9 in) in length. The tube had a very small variation in counting efficiency over the range -55° to +175 °C. It had approximately 85% counting efficiency for cosmic rays, and about 0.3% counting efficiency for photons of energy 660 keV. The "dead time" (time to reset to record the next count) of the counters was about 100 microseconds. The counter was connected to a current amplifier, which directly fed a scaler stage, a bistable transistor multivibrator that could operate over a wide range of voltages and a temperature range of -15° to +85 °C, limited primarily by the supply batteries. The scaler resolving time was 250 microseconds. For pulse counts higher than 4000 per second, the scaler indicated a count of 4000. Results were sent to the ground through the telemetry system in real time. The experiment had no onboard data storage device, and could only send telemetry to the ground when it was passing over an Earth receiving station, so some regions had no coverage during the flight.

=== Micrometeorite Detector ===
Direct measurements of micrometeorites were made on Explorer 1 using two separate detectors: a wire grid detector and a crystal transducer. The parameters determined were the influx rates of each size interval, the impinging velocity, the composition, and the density of the micrometeorite.

The wire grid detector consisted of 12 cards (connected in parallel) mounted in a fiberglass supporting ring which in turn was mounted on the satellite's cylindrical surface. Each card was wound with enameled 17-micron-diameter nickel alloy wire. Two layers of wire were wound on each card to ensure that a total area of 1 × 1 cm (0.39 × 0.39 in) completely covered. A micrometeorite of about 10 microns would fracture the wire upon impact, destroy the electrical connection, and thus record the event.

The acoustic detector (transducer and solid-state amplifier) was placed in acoustical contact with the middle section skin where it could respond to meteorite impacts on the spacecraft skin such that each recorded event would be a function of mass and velocity. The effective area of this section was 0.075 m^{2}, and the average threshold sensitivity was 0.0025 g-cm/s.

=== Satellite Drag Atmospheric Density ===
Because of its symmetrical shape, Explorer 2 was selected for use in determining upper atmospheric densities as a function of altitude, latitude, season, and solar activity. Density values near perigee were deduced from sequential observations of the spacecraft position, using optical (Baker-Nunn camera network) and radio and/or radar tracking techniques.

=== Resistance Thermometers ===
The Explorer 2 satellite was equipped with four resistance thermometers that made direct temperature measurements, three external and one internal. The primary purpose of the experiment was to study the efficacy of passive thermal control (in this case, insulation and exterior coatings) on the exterior and interior of a satellite, and to document the temperature of the instrumentation to study its effect on instrument operation.

==== Thermometers ====
The thermometer designated external temperature gauge no. 1 was mounted on the outer hull at the bottom of the upper (instrumentation) section of the satellite. This measured the cylinder skin temperature over a range of -50 °C to +110 °C, with an accuracy of 4 °C over the range -10 °C to +80 °C. External temperature gauge no. 2 was mounted along the bottom of the nose cone to measure the nose cone skin temperature. It could cover a range of -50 °C to +220 °C. The accuracy was 16 °C at a temperature of 50 °C and 18 °C at 0 °C. External temperature gauge no. 3 was mounted at the top of the nose cone and measured the stagnation-point temperature. It covered from -50 °C to +450 °C with an accuracy of approximately 20 °C.

The internal temperature gauge was mounted in the high powered transmitter at the base of the instrumentation section. It could cover a range of -60 °C to +110 °C. The accuracy was 2 °C at temperatures from 0 °C to +30 °C and fell off to an accuracy of 20 °C at a temperature of 90 °C. External temperature gauges no. 2 and no. 3 transmitted on the low-powered (10 mW, 108.00-MHz) transmitter, and the other two gauges transmitted on the high-powered (60 mW, 108.03-MHz) transmitter. Additionally, the nose cone internal temperature could be indirectly estimated by measuring the frequency of the cosmic ray channel. Calibrations of the oscillator indicate the internal nose cone temperature could be known within 12 °C from 0 to +25 °C, and to 6 °C for 25 to 50 °C.

== Telemetry ==
The telemetry was broadcast continuously. There were no recorders or data storage devices on board, so temperature data could only be received in real time covering periods when Explorer 1 was over a receiving station. There were 5 receiving stations: Patrick Air Force Base (Cape Canaveral), Earthquake Valley (near San Diego), San Gabriel, California, Singapore (Malaya), and Ibadan (Nigeria). All 5 could receive data from the low-power transmitter, only Patrick AFB and San Gabriel could receive from the high-power transmitter. There were typically 4 passes per day over Patrick AFB, Earthquake Valley, and San Gabriel, and 7 passes per day over Nigeria and Singapore.

== Thermal control ==
The exterior temperature control was achieved by coating a fraction of the stainless steel satellite casing with an aluminum oxide ceramic (Rokide A). Approximately 30% of the nose cone (upper 30 cm of the satellite) and 25% of the upper 51.4 cm (20.2 in) of the cylindrical body were coated in longitudinal stripes. There was insulation between the nose cone and instrument compartment, and between the instrument compartment and rocket motor section.

An internal temperature range of -5 °C to +45 °C was required for proper operation of the equipment in the satellite. The batteries would not operate below -5 °C, but low temperatures would not damage the batteries or equipment. Permanent damage to the equipment would not occur unless the temperature rose above +80 °C.

== Telecommunications ==
Data were continuously transmitted using a 60 mW amplitude-modulated transmitter and a 10 mW phase-modulated transmitter, both transmitting as a frequency of 108 MHz. Data were recorded only when the spacecraft was over one of seventeen receiving stations. Both the high-power and low-power transmitters were battery powered and operated.

== Launch vehicle ==
The launch vehicle was a Juno I, a variant of the three-stage Jupiter-C with an added fourth propulsive stage, which in this case was the Explorer 2. The first stage was an upgraded Redstone liquid-fueled launch vehicle. The second stage comprised a cluster of eleven Sergeant solid-fuel rocket motors and the third stage held three Sergeants. The booster was equipped to spin the fourth stage in increments, leading to a final rate of 750 rpm about its long axis.

== Mission ==
Explorer 2 launched from the Cape Canaveral Missile Test Center of the Atlantic Missile Range (AMR), pad 26A, on 5 March 1958 at 18:27:57 GMT. The flight was nominal through third stage ignition. The fourth stage failed to ignite, making attainment of orbital velocity impossible. The spacecraft reentered the atmosphere and fell into the Atlantic Ocean near Trinidad, some 3,000 km (1,900 mi) from the launch site. The cause of the failure was believed to be due to failure of a light plastic cone, which held the igniter in place at the fourth stage nozzle, under the launch stresses. This allowed the igniter to fall out of position. The igniter support was strengthened for later flights.

== See also ==
- Explorer 1
- Explorer program
