= Project Beacon =

Artificial satellites

Beacon
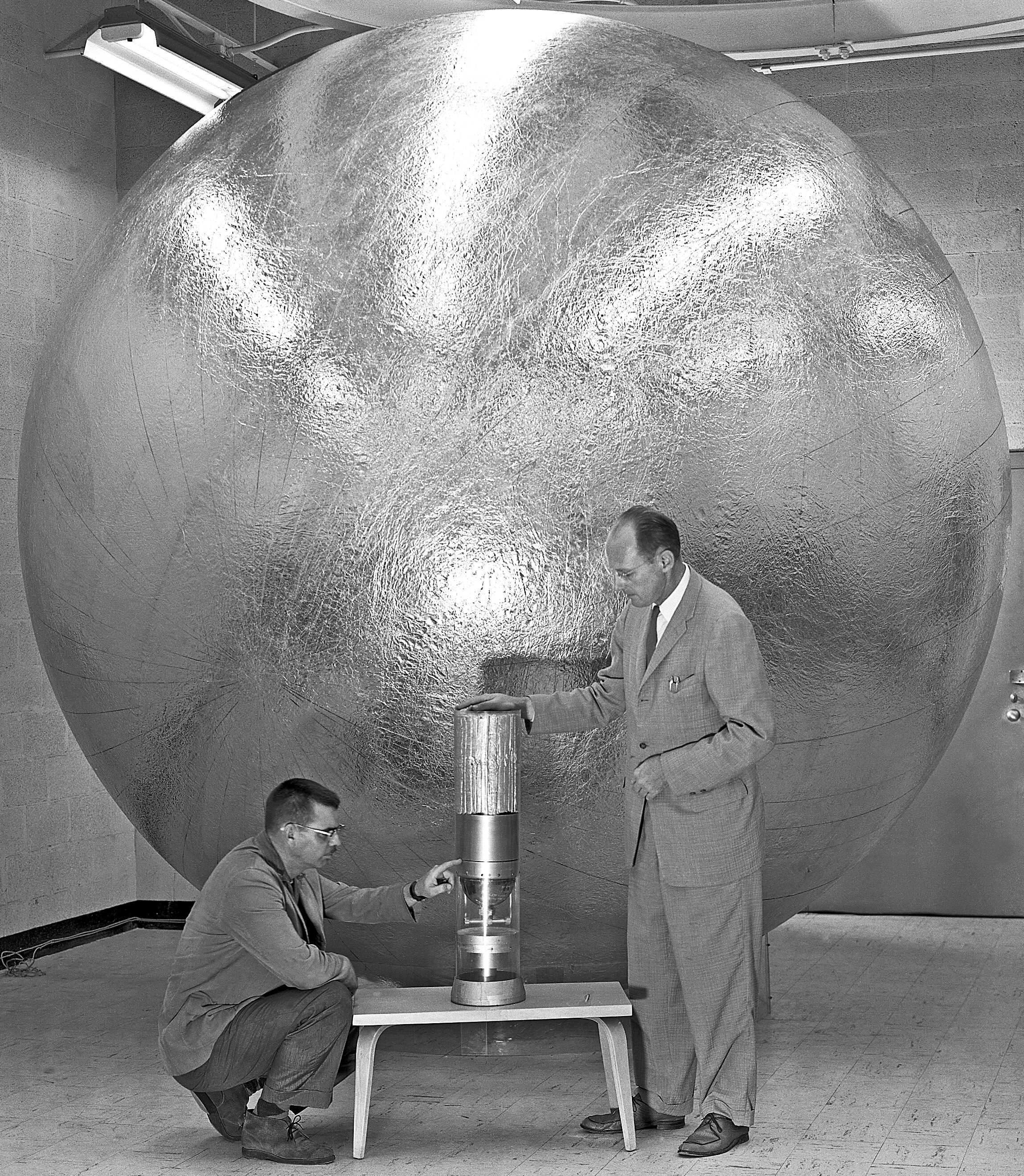
- William J. O'Sullivan (right, standing) and an unidentified engineer with Beacon 2, June 1959.
- Country/ies of origin: United States
- Type: Air Density
- Status: Retired (1959)

Constellation size
- First launch: 1958
- Last launch: 1959
- Total launches: 2

Beacon was one of America's first satellite programs. A balloon satellite, its objective was to study atmospheric density at its orbital altitude and to be the first United States satellite visible to the naked eye. Booster problems caused both orbital attempts to end in failure.

== Background ==
Beacon was an International Geophysical Year (IGY) satellite program developed by the National Advisory Committee for Aeronautics Space Vehicle Group at Langley under aeronautical engineer William James O'Sullivan, Jr.

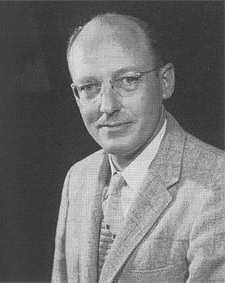
Langley aeronautical engineer William James O'Sullivan, Jr.

O'Sullivan held the belief that measuring the air density at orbital altitudes would be of critical importance to a space agency and that a simple balloon satellite, several meters in diameter, would be well suited to the task as their relatively large size and low mass make them especially sensitive to air drag effects. After the Soviets launched the first artificial satellite, Sputnik 1, on October 4, 1957, a high priority was placed on orbiting an American satellite that would be visible from the ground. O'Sullivan's balloon satellite would accomplish that purpose, as, once in orbit, it would be as bright as a third or fourth magnitude star, enabling easy optical and photographic tracking. This brightness led to the satellite being called "Beacon."

== Spacecraft ==
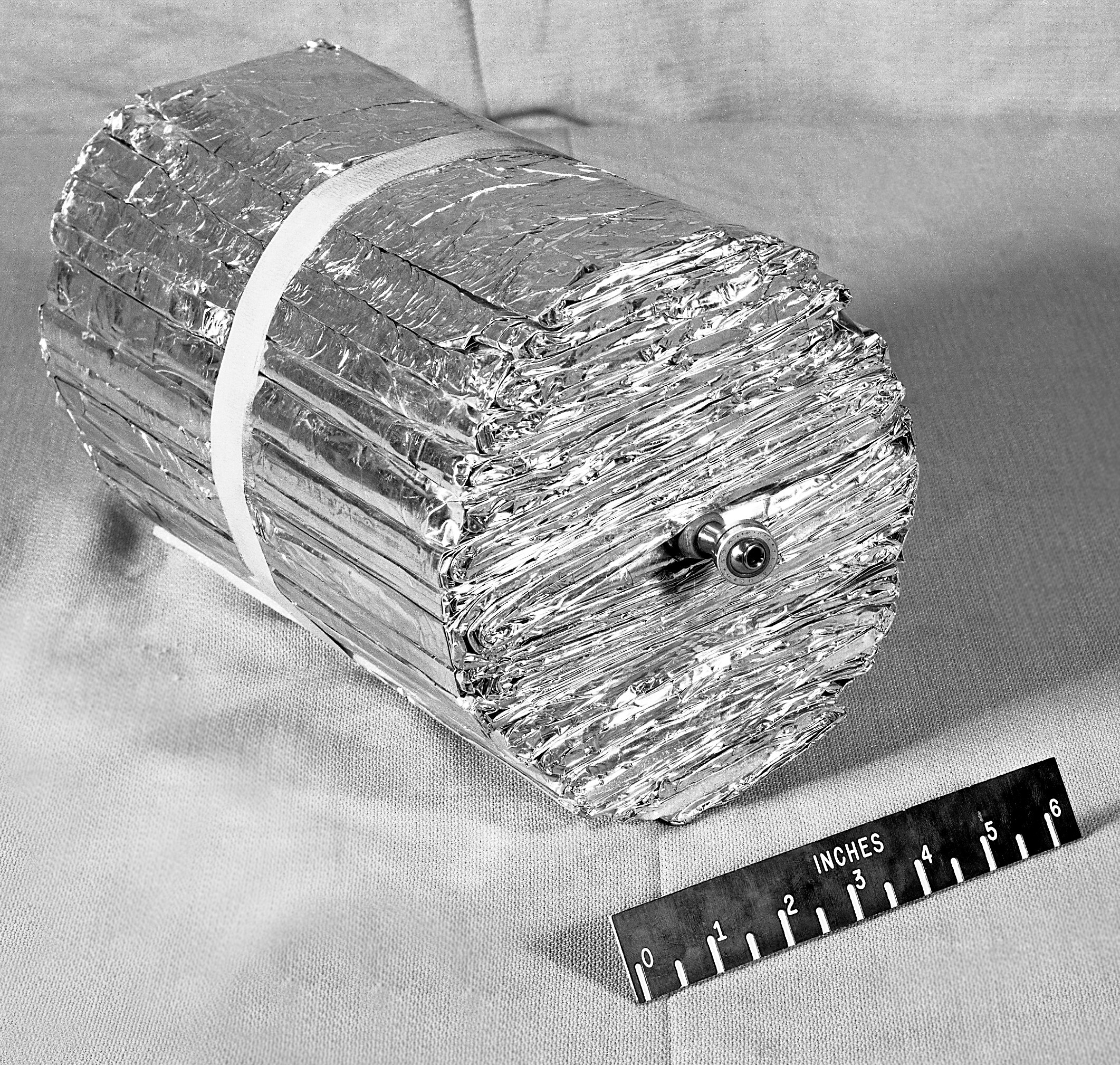
Beacon 2 folded up before flight

Beacon was an uninstrumented, inflatable 3.66 meter (12 ft) diameter sphere made of laminated mylar polyester film, 25 micrometers in thickness, and coated on both sides with an 11 micrometer-thick layer of aluminum foil. Before inflation, it folded into a cylindrical package with a mass of 4.2 kg (9.26 lbs). The package was installed into the bottom of the stainless steel payload casing mounted at the top of its rocket. An ejection piston device with a 15-pound spring would push the payload casing away from the motor after burnout. Within the casing was a connecting valve, bellows, a pressurizing nitrogen bottle, and a squib-actuated valve to inflate the sphere. Above this was the transmitter operating on the IGY standard frequency of 108.03 MHz, powered by 8 mercury batteries.

== Flights ==
Four suborbital inflation tests were flown on two-stage Nike-Cajun sounding rockets in 1958 from Wallops Island.

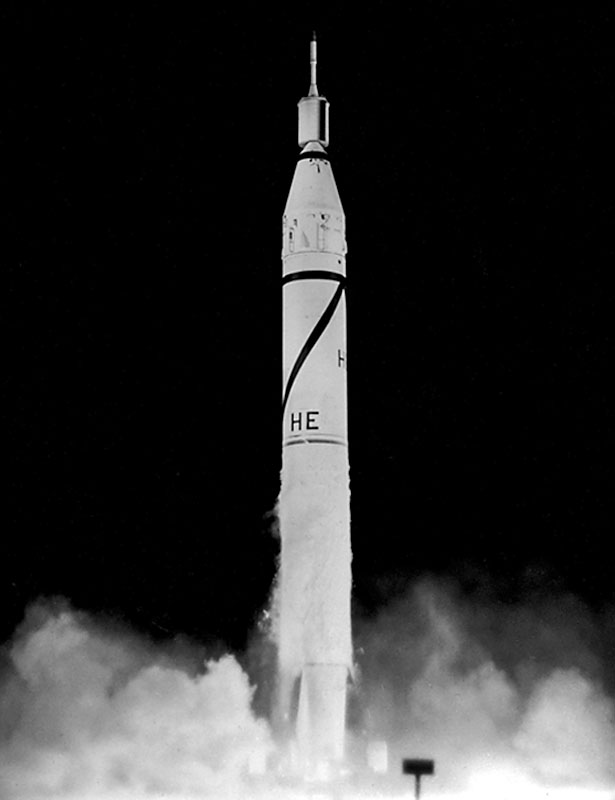
Juno 1 launching Beacon 1 from LC5 at Cape Canaveral, Florida October 23, 1958.

Beacon 1 (often called "Explorer 6") was launched on October 24, 1958, at 3:21 am UTC by a Juno 1 from Cape Canaveral's Launch Complex 5 in Cape Canaveral, Florida. The rocket fell apart in mid-flight: at 112 seconds after launch, the Beacon payload broke away from the vehicle; stages 2 and 3 broke off at 149.9 seconds. The payload fell into the Atlantic Ocean 424 seconds after launch. Total flight time for the first stage was 526 seconds. This launch marked the final flight of the Juno 1 rocket.

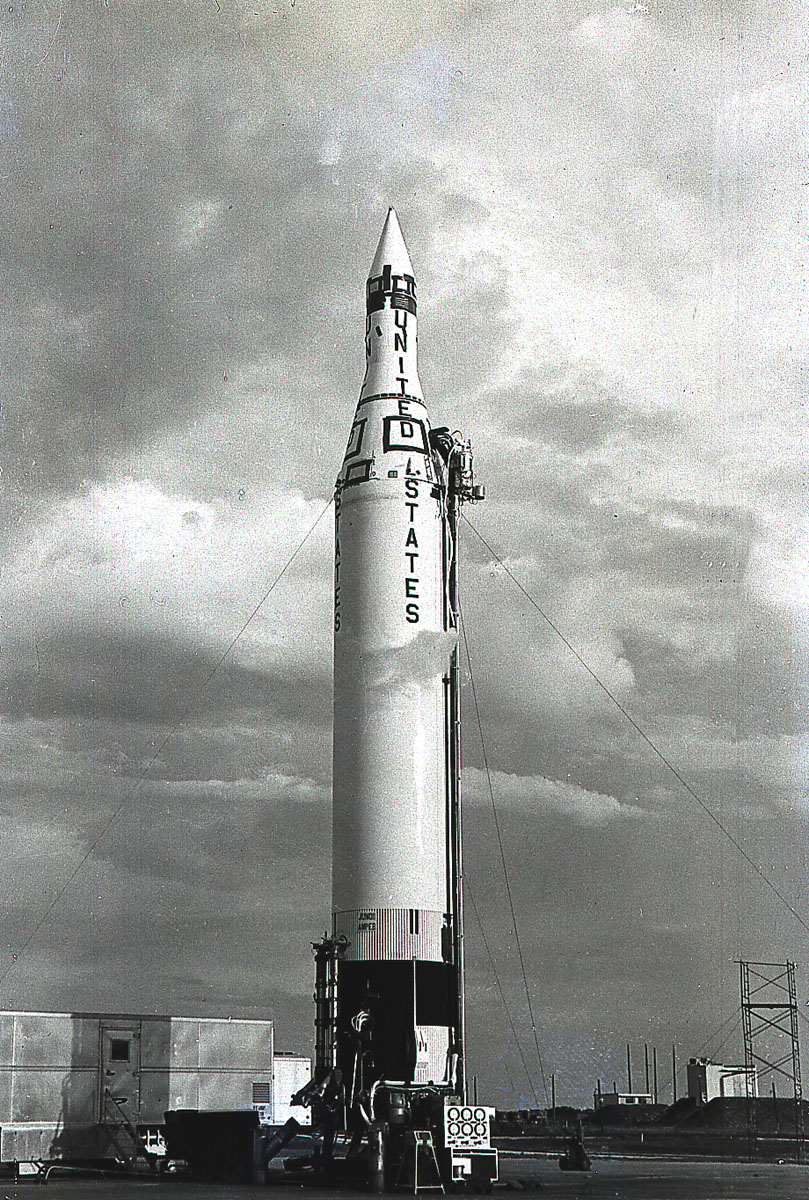
Juno II with Beacon 2, LC-26B at Cape Canaveral, Florida, August 15, 1959.

After a successful suborbital test on January 28, 1959 that lofted a Beacon to 125 km in altitude, Beacon 2 was launched from Cape Canaveral's Launch Complex 26 on August 15, 1959, at 00:31:00.7 UT on a three-staged Juno 2 (the booster normally comprised four stages; a fourth stage was not required as Beacon 2 would return data on air density from a low orbit.) Headed northeast for orbit on a 48 degree azimuth, the rocket ran into trouble three minutes into the flight, at about the time of first stage cutoff. A series of tracking flares was to be ejected from the guidance. Only the first one was observed to have fired. The guidance compartment, now separated from the first stage, depressurized 23 seconds later, probably from ignition of the remaining tracking flares within the compartment. The guidance and control system then failed, causing the upper stages to fire in the wrong direction, and Beacon 2 fell short of orbit.

== Legacy ==
Though Beacon never successfully orbited, it did play an important role in the establishment of NACA's successor agency, NASA. On April 22, 1958, before the House Select Committee on Science and Astronautics, NACA Director Hugh Dryden explained, among many other things, how large aluminized balloons could be inflated in orbit and used for communication tests. O'Sullivan elaborated on this point, impressing the Congressmen by inflating a full-size Beacon satellite and asserting that much larger balloon spacecraft could easily be developed.

Project Echo, a direct successor of Beacon, was developed by O'Sullivan's team and launched in 1960.

== Status ==
A model of the Beacon package installed in the final stage of a Juno rocket can be found at the National Air and Space Museum.

== Table of Launches ==
Name	Launch date	Location	Launch vehicle	
Beacon Test 1	April 24, 1958	Wallops	Nike-Cajun	Success
Beacon Test 1R	April 25, 1958	Wallops	Nike-Cajun	Success
Beacon Test 2	May 25, 1958	Wallops	Nike-Cajun	Success
Beacon Test 3	September 11, 1958	Wallops	Nike-Cajun	Success
Beacon 1	October 24, 1958	CC LC 5	Juno I	Failure
Beacon Test 4	January 28, 1959	Wallops	Nike-Cajun	Success
Beacon 2	August 15, 1959	CC LC-26B	Juno II	Failure

== See also ==
- Explorer 9 (the first successful balloon satellite)
- Project Echo (a balloon-type passive communications satellite)
