= Cape Canaveral Launch Complex 5 =

Former launch site at Cape Canaveral Space Force Station, Florida

Launch Complex 5
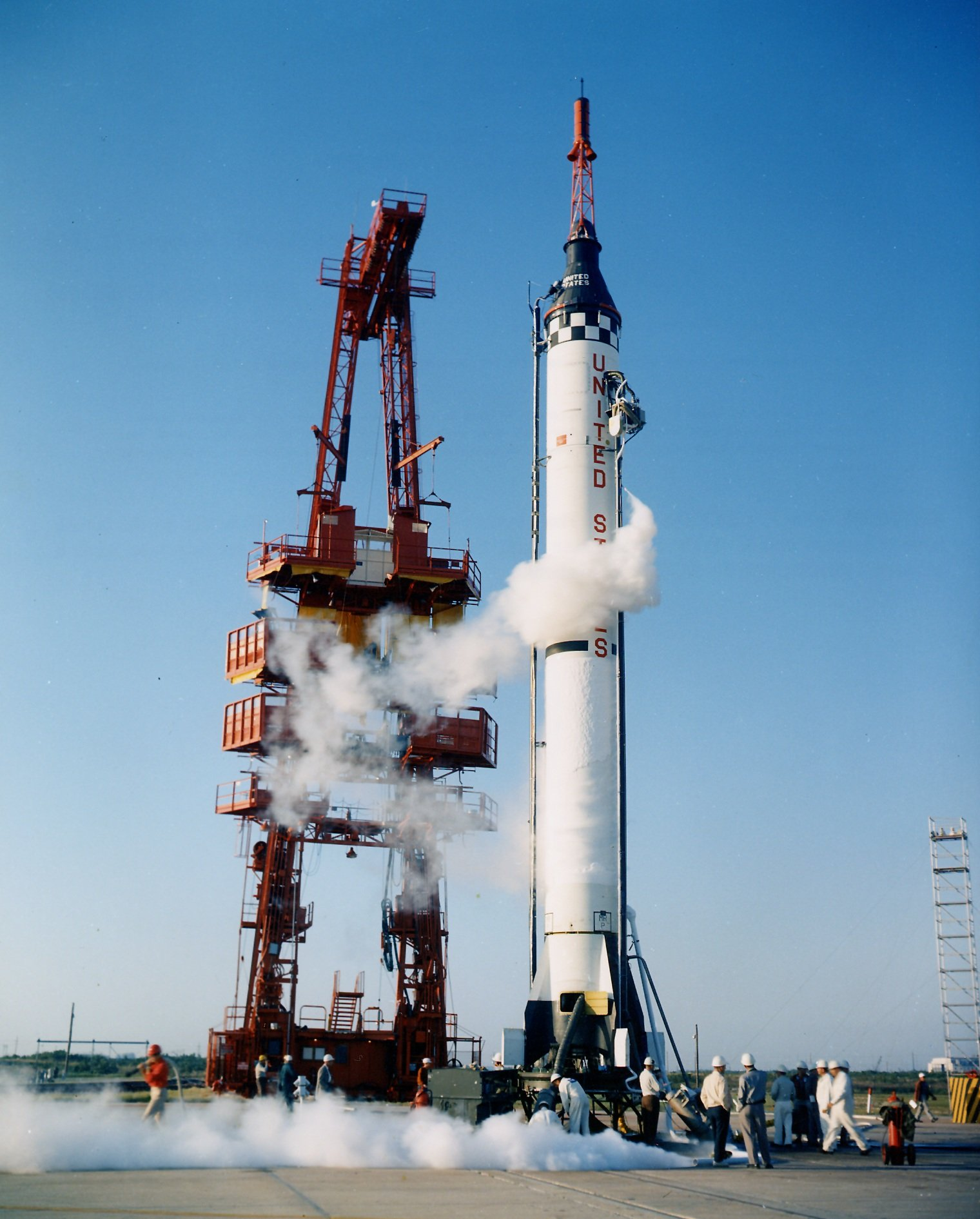
- Mercury-Redstone 1 at LC-5 in 1960
- Interactive map of Launch Complex 5
- Launch site: Cape Canaveral Space Force Station
- Location: 28°26′22″N 80°34′24″W
- Time zone: UTC−05:00 (EST)
  - Summer (DST): UTC−04:00 (EDT)
- Short name: LC-5
- Operator: United States Space Force
Launch history
- Status: Demolished
- Launches: 23
- First launch: 19 July 1956; Jupiter-A
- Last launch: 21 July 1961; MRLV (Mercury-Redstone 4)
- Associated rockets: Jupiter-A; Jupiter-C; PGM-19 Jupiter; Juno I PGM-11 Redstone; Juno II; Redstone MRLV

Launch sites at Cape Canaveral Space Force Station and Kennedy Space Center
Active pads
Repurposed pads, not used for launches
Inactive leased pads
Inactive unleased pads
1 LC-39B
2 LC-39A
3 LC-48
4 SLC-41
5 SLC-40
6 LC-47
7 SLC-37
8 LC-34
9 SLC-20
10 LC-19
11 LC-16
12 LC-15
13 LC-14
14 LC-13 (LZ-2)
15 LC-12
16 LC-11
17 LC-36
18 LC-1, LC-2, LC-3, and LC-4
19 SLC-46
20 LC-21 and LC-22
21 LC-31 and LC-32
22 LC-18
23 SLC-17
24 LC-26
25 LC-5 and LC-6
26 LC-30
27 LC-25
28 LC-29

Cape Canaveral Launch Complex 5 (LC-5) was a launch site at Cape Canaveral Space Force Station, Florida used for various Redstone and Jupiter launches.

It is most well known as the launch site for NASA's 1961 suborbital Mercury-Redstone 3 flight, which made Alan Shepard the first American in space. It was also the launch site of Gus Grissom's July, 1961, Mercury-Redstone 4 flight. The Mercury-Redstone 1 pad abort, Mercury-Redstone 1A, and the January, 1961, Mercury-Redstone 2 with a chimpanzee, Ham, aboard, also used LC-5.

A total of 23 launches were conducted from LC-5: one Jupiter-A, six Jupiter IRBMs, one Jupiter-C, four Juno Is, four Juno IIs and seven Redstones. The first launch from the complex was a Jupiter-A on July 19, 1956 and the final launch was Gus Grissom's Liberty Bell 7 capsule on July 21, 1961.

LC-5 is located next to the Cape Canaveral Space Force Museum which is located at LC-26. The original launch consoles and computers are on display in the LC-5 blockhouse. As of 2020, a tour of the museum can be arranged through the Kennedy Space Center Visitor Complex's "Cape Canaveral: Early Space Tour". One tour is offered daily, so the number of visitors is limited by the size of the tour.

== Launch statistics ==
- PGM-11 Redstone
- PGM-19 Jupiter
- Juno I
- Juno II
- Mercury-Redstone

All launches before October 1958 operated by the United States Army. All launches since operated by NASA.

No.	Date	Time (UTC)	Launch vehicle	Payload/mission	Result	Remarks
1	19 July 1956	08:45	Jupiter-A	Suborbital test	Success	First launch from LC-5.
2	20 September 1956	06:45	Jupiter-C	Suborbital test	Success	
3	1 March 1957	21:51	PGM-19 Jupiter	Suborbital test	Failure	Maiden flight of the PGM-19 Jupiter. Heating in tail section led to vehicle breakup 7 seconds after launch.
4	26 April 1957	20:12	PGM-19 Jupiter	Suborbital test	Partial failure	Propellant slosh led to vehicle breakup 93 seconds after launch. Flight considered a success.
5	31 May 1957	18:08	PGM-19 Jupiter	Suborbital test	Success	First fully successful flight of the PGM-19 Jupiter and of a Western IRBM.
6	26 March 1958	17:38	Juno I	Explorer 3	Success	Part of the Explorer program, aiming to confirm findings studied by Explorer 1. First orbital launch and Juno I flight from LC-5.
7	17 May 1958	00:05	PGM-11 Redstone	Suborbital test	Success	
8	26 July 1958	15:00	Juno I	Explorer 4	Success	Part of the Explorer program, aiming to study the Van Allen radiation belts and the magnetosphere.
9	24 August 1958	06:17	Juno I	Explorer 5	Failure	Part of the Explorer program, aiming to study the Van Allen radiation belts and the magnetosphere. Mishap during staging led to loss of control and failure to reach orbit.
10	23 October 1958	03:21	Juno I	Beacon 1	Failure	Part of Project Beacon, a balloon satellite designed to study atmospheric density. Upper stages separated prematurely, leading to failure to reach orbit. Last flight of the Juno I.
11	6 December 1958	05:44	Juno II	Pioneer 3	Partial failure	Part of the Pioneer program, aiming to study the Moon. Maiden flight of the Juno II. Circuit malfunction caused premature first stage cutoff, placing satellite on steep suborbital trajectory.
12	22 January 1959	00:10	PGM-19 Jupiter	Suborbital test	Success	
13	3 March 1959	05:10	Juno II	Pioneer 4	Success	Part of the Pioneer program, aiming to study the Moon. Maiden flight of the Juno II. First successful American mission to the Moon, and first American satellite to enter heliocentric orbit.
14	14 May 1959	05:52	PGM-19 Jupiter	Suborbital test	Success	
15	16 July 1959	17:37	Juno II	Explorer S-1	Failure	Part of the Explorer program, aiming to study cosmic rays such as Lyman-alpha x-rays. Shorted diode led to control failure immediately after liftoff, causing range safety protocols 5 seconds after launch.
16	27 August 1959	01:30	PGM-19 Jupiter	Suborbital test	Success	
17	13 October 1959	15:30	Juno II	Explorer 7	Success	Part of the Explorer program, aiming to study cosmic rays such as Lyman-alpha x-rays. Reflight of Explorer S-1's objective. Final orbital launch from LC-5.
18	21 November 1960	14:00	Mercury-Redstone Launch Vehicle	Mercury-Redstone 1	Failure	Maiden flight of the MRLV, designed to perform an uncrewed suborbital flight for Project Mercury. Redstone engine shutdown immediately after launch, settling back onto the pad, becoming known as the "four-inch flight".
19	19 December 1960	16:15	Mercury-Redstone Launch Vehicle	Mercury-Redstone 1A	Success	Reflight of MR-1. First successful flight of the MRLV, reusing the capsule used in MR-1.
20	31 January 1961	16:54	Mercury-Redstone Launch Vehicle	Mercury-Redstone 2	Success	Carried chimpanzee Ham into space as a live rehearsal for a crewed flight. Ham became the first great ape to be put in space.
21	24 March 1961	17:30	Mercury-Redstone Launch Vehicle	Mercury-Redstone BD	Success	Test flight for the MRLV, carrying a boilerplate Mercury capsule. Developed by Wernher Von Braun to certify human rating.
22	5 May 1961	14:34	Mercury-Redstone Launch Vehicle	Mercury-Redstone 3 (Freedom 7)	Success	First crewed flight from the United States, first crewed launch of Project Mercury, and first crewed launch from LC-5. Carried astronaut Alan Shepard on a suborbital trajectory, becoming the first American and second person (after Yuri Gagarin) into space.
23	21 July 1961	12:20	Mercury-Redstone Launch Vehicle	Mercury-Redstone 4 (Liberty Bell 7)	Success	Second crewed American spaceflight, carrying astronaut Gus Grissom into space. Emergency hatch procedures accidentally fired, causing capsule to sink and Grissom to almost drown. Last American suborbital spaceflight from a rocket until Blue Origin NS-16 in 2021 and most recent crewed suborbital launch from Cape Canaveral. Final launch from LC-5 before conversion into the Cape Canaveral Space Force Museum.

== Gallery ==
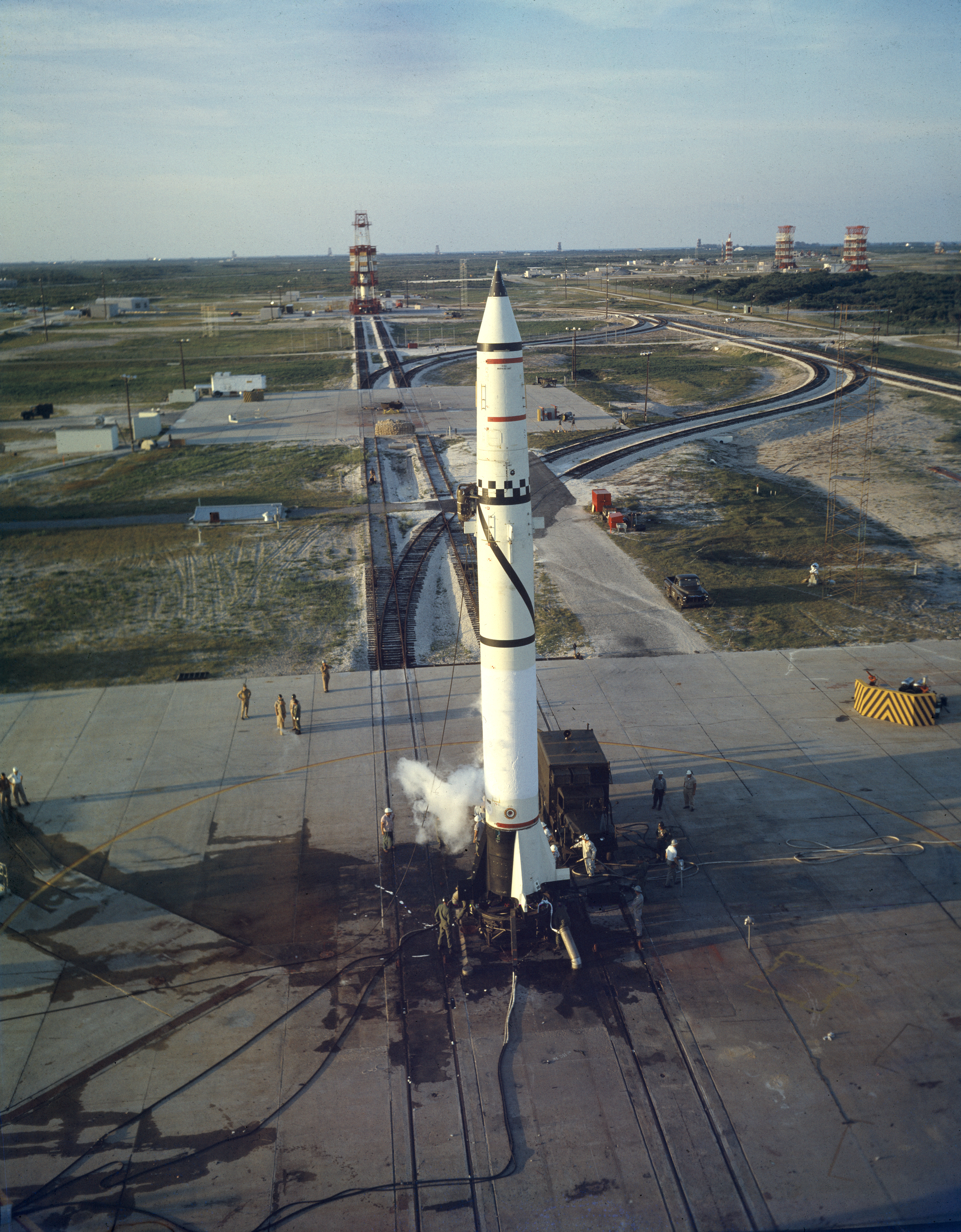
Preparations on May 16, 1958 for the first PGM-11 Redstone launch on May 17 conducted by US Army troops

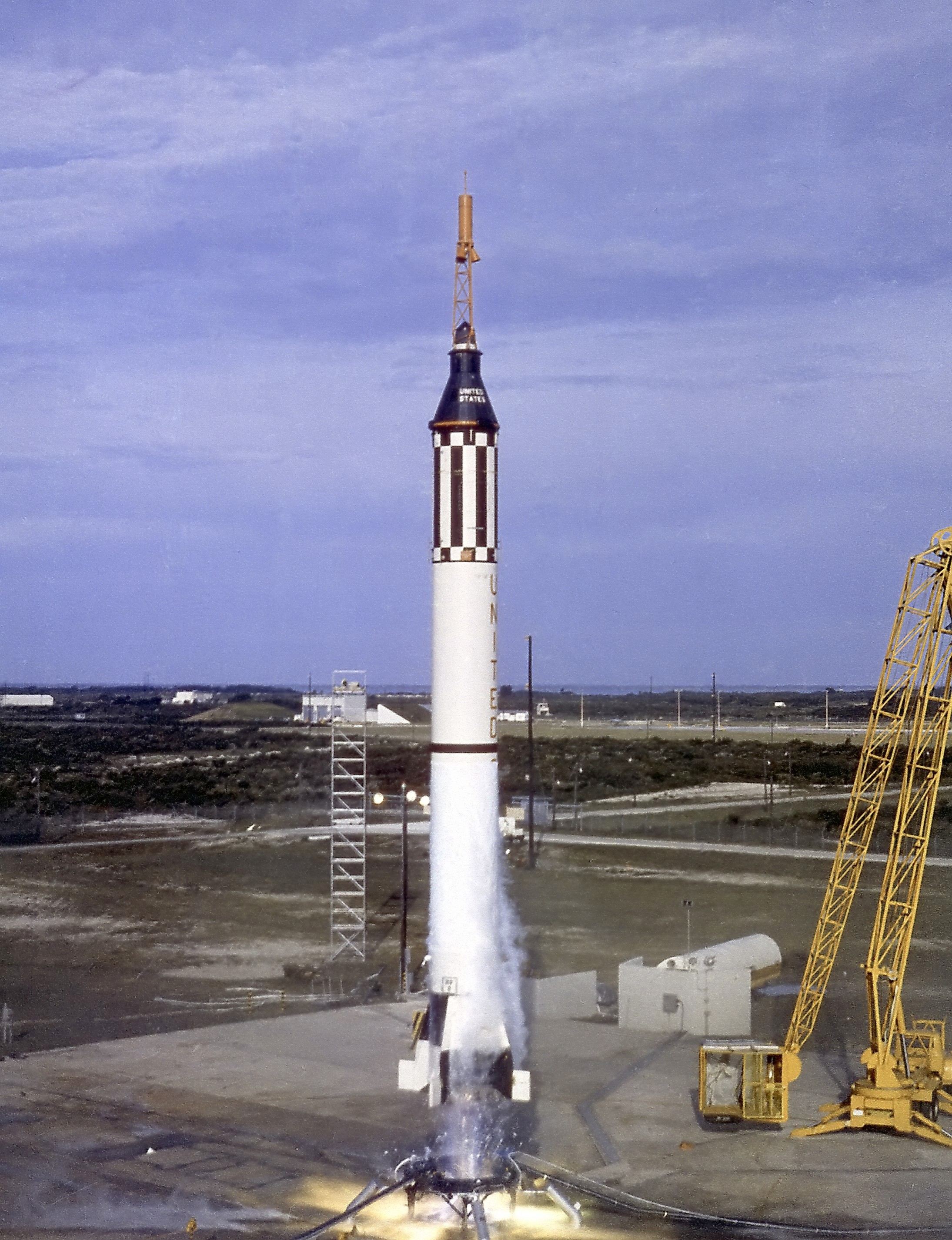
Launch of Liberty Bell 7 (MR-4)

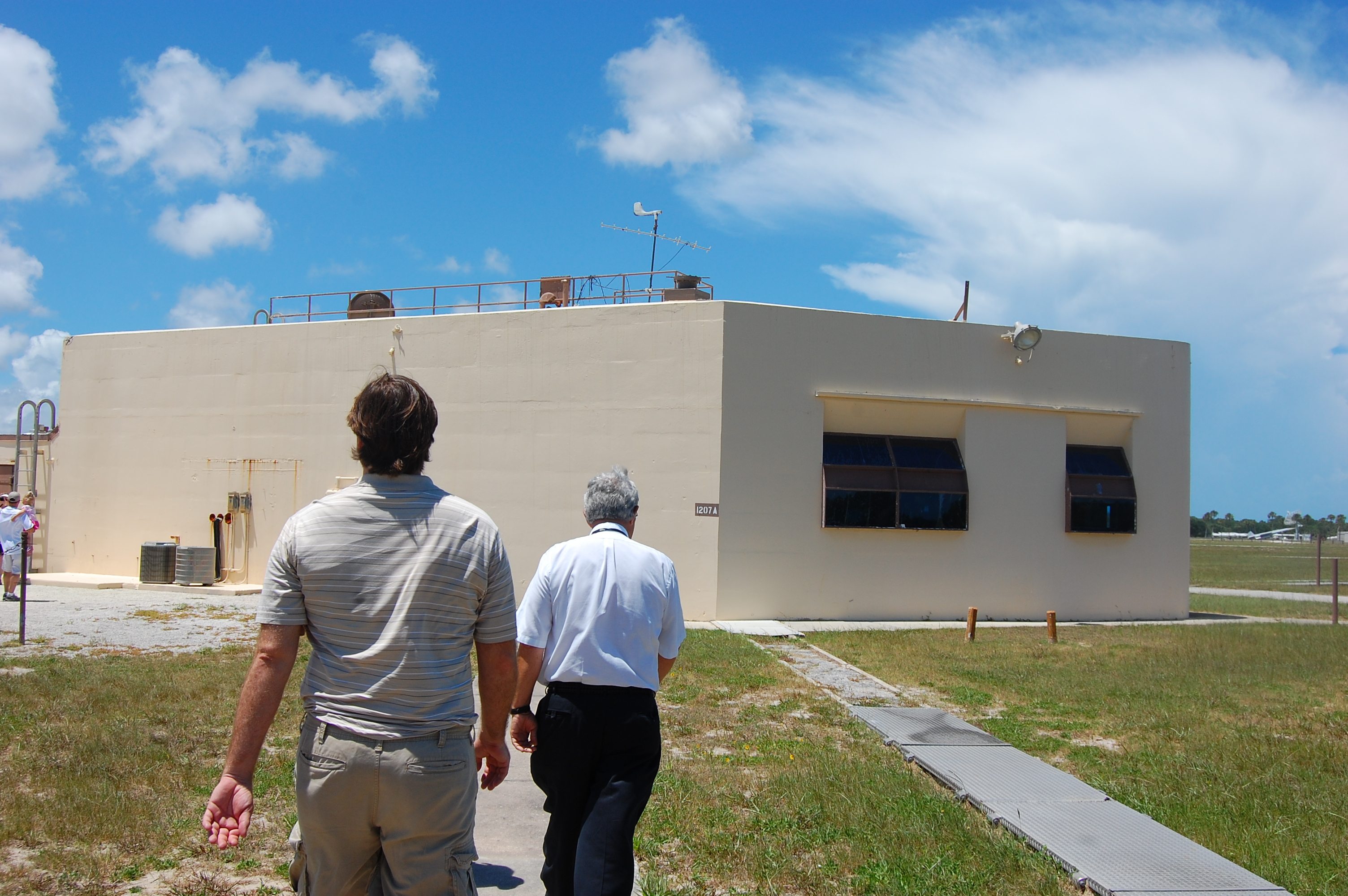
Blockhouse (2010)

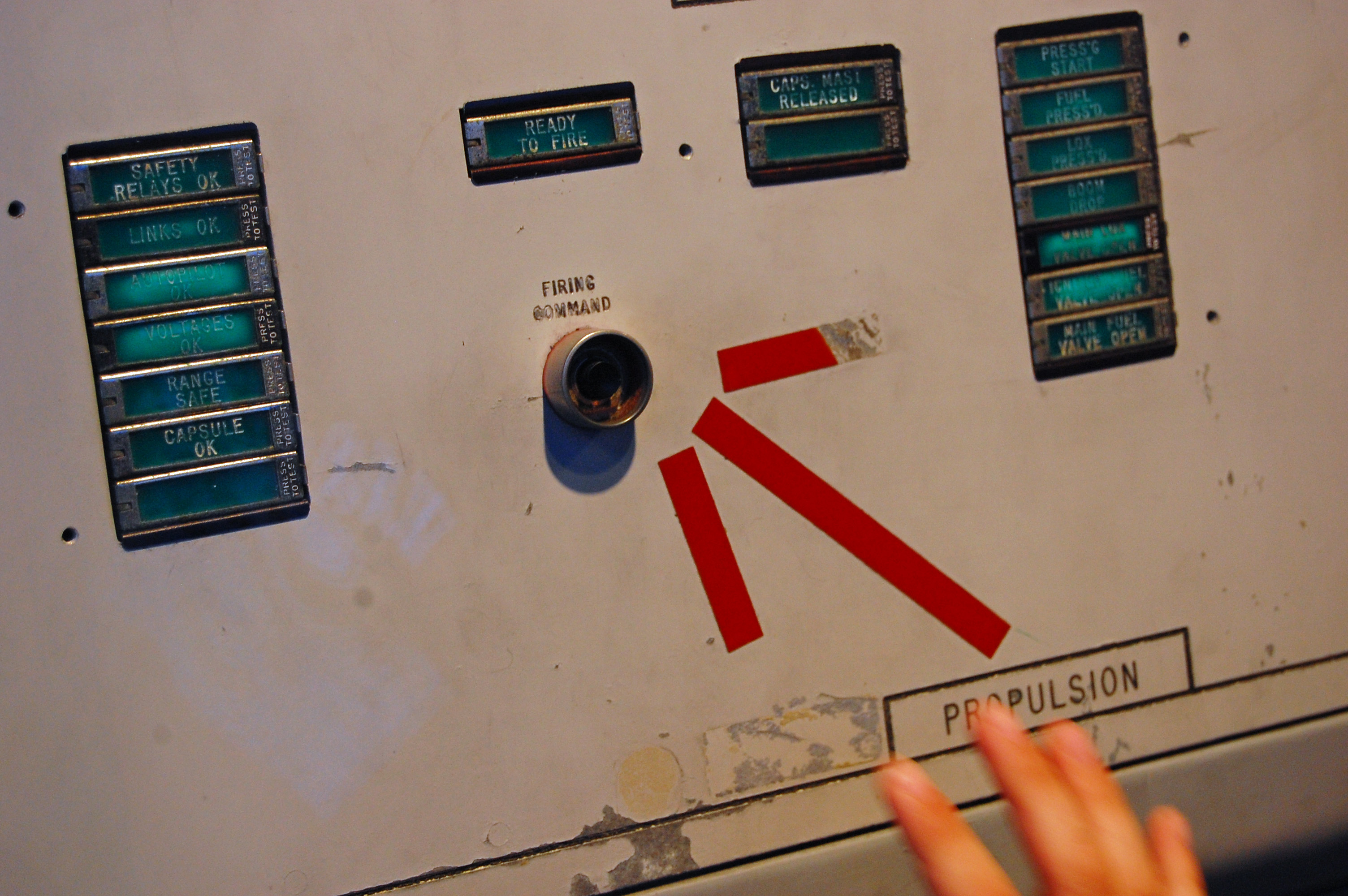
Firing button (2010)

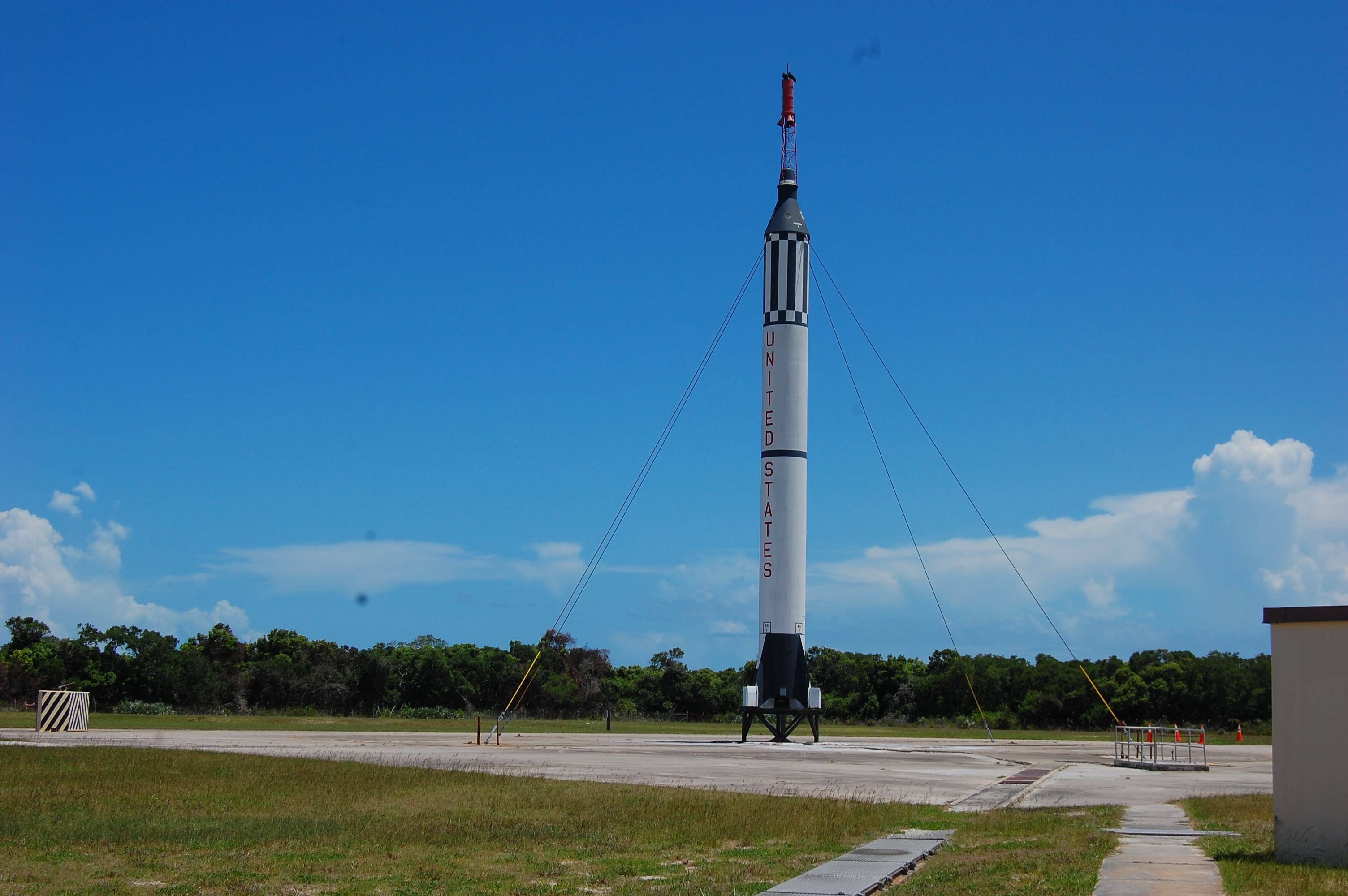
LC-5 with display Redstone (2010)

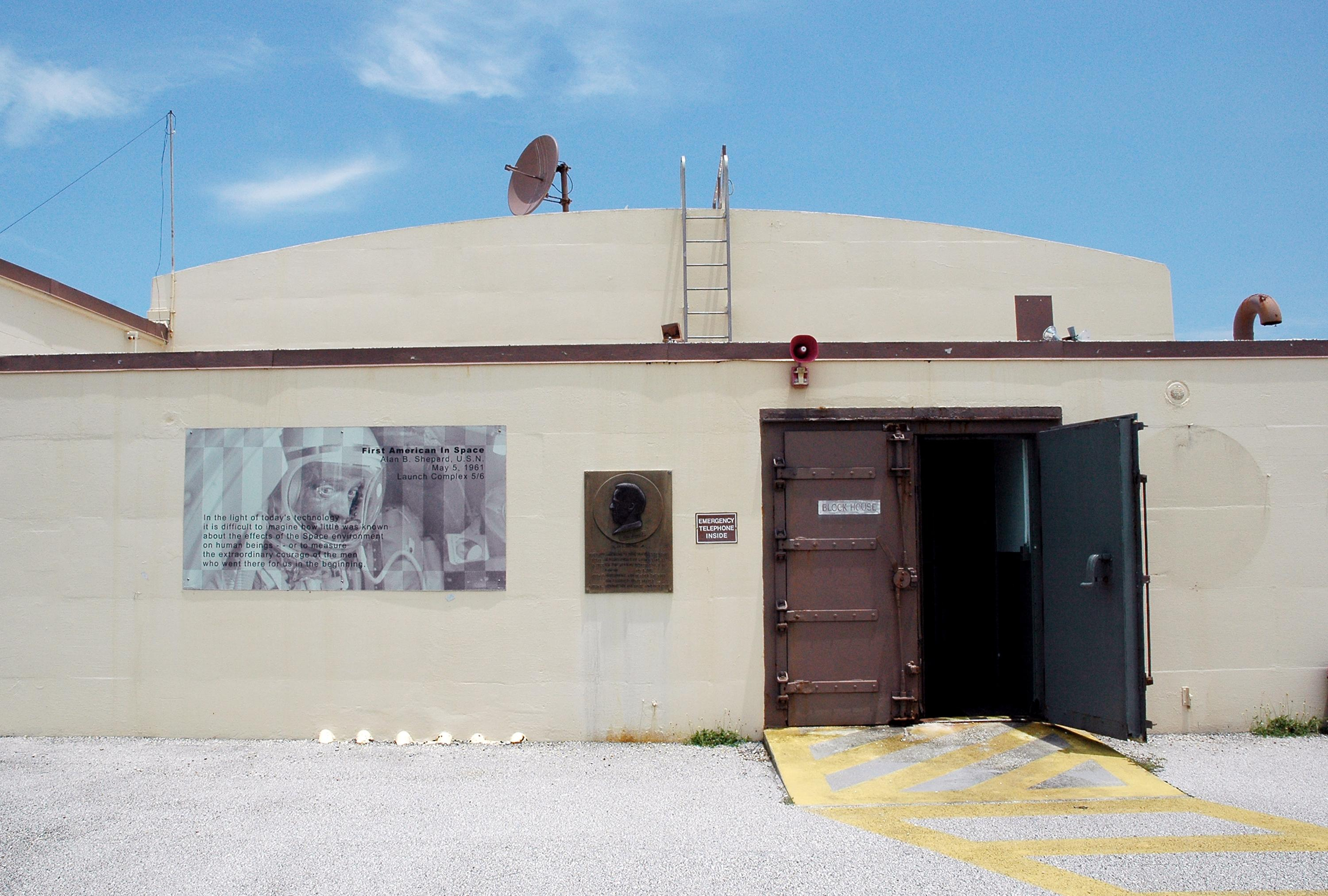
LC 5&6 blockhouse (now museum)

== See also ==
- Cape Canaveral Space Force Museum
- List of Cape Canaveral and Merritt Island launch sites
- Project Mercury
- Jupiter
- Redstone
- Cape Canaveral Launch Complex 6 - used the same blockhouse
