= Vaghela =

Vaghela may refer to:

- Vaghela dynasty, an Indian dynasty that ruled parts of Gujarat during 1244–1304 CE
- Vaghela (surname), an Indian Gujarati-language surname

== See also ==
- Baghel (disambiguation)
- Vaghel, village in Gujarat, India
- Vaghela Derol, a village in Gujarat, India
