= Bagel (disambiguation) =

A bagel is a ring-shaped roll of yeasted wheat dipped in hot water prior to baking.

Bagel or bagels may also refer to:

- Hydyne, rocket fuel with the unofficial whimsical name 'Bagel'
- Bagel, winning any game by shutout
  - Bagel (tennis), to win a set 6–0 in tennis
  - Bagel (pickleball), to win a game 11-0
- "Bagels", an episode of the television series Teletubbies
- Bagel, a slang term among South African Jews for an overly materialistic and excessively groomed young man

== See also ==
- Bagels & Yox, a 1951 comedy/variety theater revue; see Central Theatre (New York City)
- Bagle (computer worm), a mass-mailing computer worm
