= Mahalleh-ye Baghel =

Mahalleh-ye Baghel محله بغل
- Village
- Country: Iran
- Province: Yazd
- County: Taft
- Bakhsh: Nir
- Rural District: Sakhvid

Population (2006)
  - Total: 64
- Time zone: UTC+3:30 (IRST)
  - Summer (DST): UTC+4:30 (IRDT)

Mahalleh-ye Baghel (Persian: محله بغل, also Romanized as Maḩalleh-e Baghel) is a village in Sakhvid Rural District, Nir District, Taft County, Yazd Province, Iran. At the 2006 census, its population was 64, in 21 families.
