= Explorer 3 =

Satellite launched by the United States (1958)

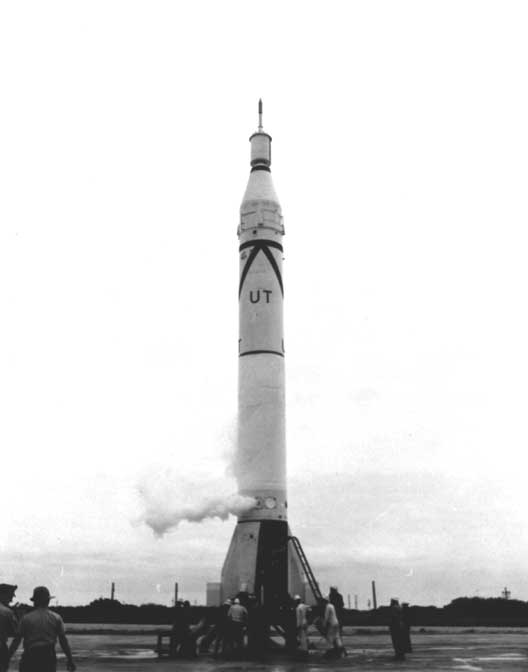
- Juno I rocket with Explorer 3 satellite
- Names: Explorer III; 1958 Gamma
- Mission type: Earth science
- Operator: JPL / U.S. Army Ordnance
- Harvard designation: 1958 Gamma
- COSPAR ID: 1958-003A
- SATCAT no.: 00006
- Mission duration: 93 days (achieved); 120 days (planned)

Spacecraft properties
- Spacecraft: Explorer III
- Spacecraft type: Science Explorer
- Bus: Explorer 1
- Manufacturer: Jet Propulsion Laboratory
- Launch mass: 14.1 kg (31 lb)
- Payload mass: 8.4 kg (19 lb)
- Dimensions: 203 cm (80 in) length 15.2 cm (6.0 in) diameter
- Power: 60 watts

Start of mission
- Launch date: 26 March 1958, 17:38:01 GMT
- Rocket: Juno I (RS-24)
- Launch site: Atlantic Missile Range, LC-5
- Contractor: Army Ballistic Missile Agency
- Entered service: 26 March 1958

End of mission
- Last contact: 28 June 1958
- Decay date: 28 June 1958

Orbital parameters
- Reference system: Geocentric orbit
- Regime: Medium Earth orbit
- Perigee altitude: 186 km (116 mi)
- Apogee altitude: 2,799 km (1,739 mi)
- Inclination: 33.38°
- Period: 115.70 minutes

Instruments
- Cosmic Ray counter Micrometeorite detector

Explorer 3 (Harvard designation 1958 Gamma) was an American artificial satellite launched into medium Earth orbit in 1958. It was the second successful launch in the Explorer program, and was nearly identical to the first U.S. satellite Explorer 1 in its design and mission.

== Background ==
Explorer 3 was the third satellite in the Explorer small satellite series, which started with Explorer 1, America's first artificial satellite. The Explorer program was a direct successor to the Army Ballistic Missile Agency (ABMA)'s Project Orbiter, initiated in November 1954 to use a slightly modified Redstone missile combined with solid-propellant rocket cluster upper stage to put a satellite into orbit.

In 1955, the "Stewart Committee", under the chairmanship of Homer J. Stewart of Jet Propulsion Laboratory (JPL), chose a Naval Research Laboratory (NRL) satellite plan using a rocket based on its Viking rocket (Project Vanguard) for the International Geophysical Year, which would start 1 July 1957. Nevertheless, ABMA hoped Redstone-Orbiter could still be used as a backup orbital system. Reentry tests that year conducted with the newly developed, Redstone-based Jupiter-C, further strengthened ABMA confidence in their vehicle as an orbital launcher.

Following the launch of the Soviet satellite Sputnik 1 on 4 October 1957, Project Orbiter was revived, with two shots authorized as a back-up to Vanguard in early November. The failure of America's first attempted Vanguard launch on 6 December 1957, cleared the way for an "Explorer" (as the crash program was dubbed) to be the first American satellite.

Working closely together, ABMA and JPL completed the job of modifying the Jupiter-C to the Juno 1 and building Explorer 1 in 84 days. An experiment developed for Vanguard by George Ludwig, comprising an Anton 314 omnidirectional Geiger tube detector for measuring the flux of high energy charged protons and electrons, was adapted for Explorer 1. Because of the high spin rate of the Explorer 1 rocket, the experiment's tape recorder had to be omitted, which meant that data could only be collected when the satellite was in sight and range of a ground station.

Explorer 1 took off 31 January 1958, becoming America's first satellite. Its Geiger tube worked properly, but acted contrary to expectations. As the satellite ascended in its orbit, the radiation count increased, then abruptly dropped to zero. When the satellite was descending, the tube abruptly began detecting charged particles again. As data could only be received about 15% of the time, it was yet impossible to determine the phenomenon Explorer had detected.

== Spacecraft ==
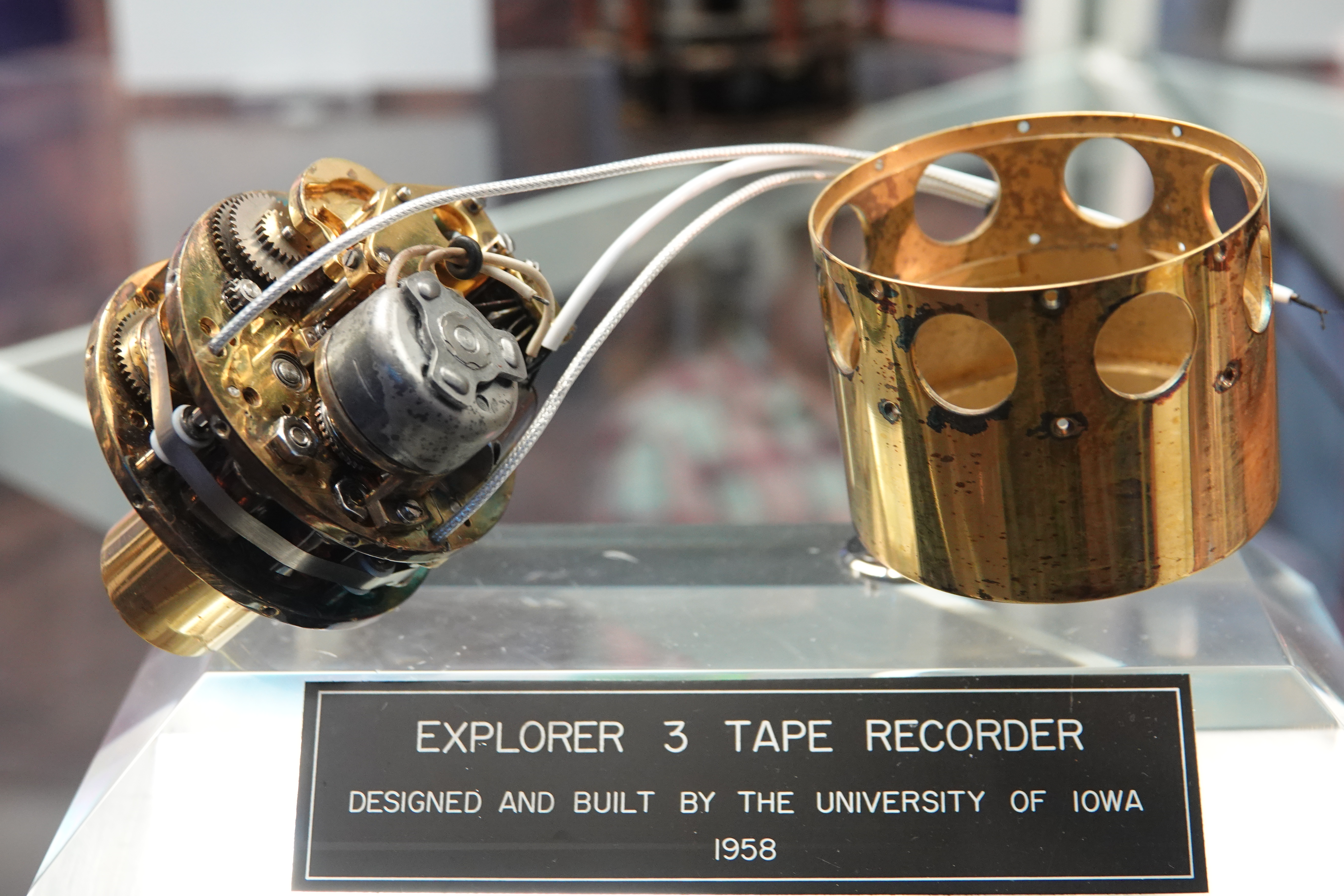
Explorer 3 Tape Recorder

The objective of this spacecraft was a continuation of experiments started with Explorer 1. The payload consisted of a micrometeorite detector (a wire grid array and acoustic detector) and the same cosmic ray counter (a Geiger-Müller tube) experiment included on Explorer 1, but this time with an on-board tape recorder to provide a complete radiation history for each orbit, Ludwig having had time to accommodate for the spin-stabilization of the satellite.

Its total weight was 14.1 kg (31 lb), of which 8.4 kg (19 lb) was instrumentation. The instrument section at the front end of the satellite and the empty scaled-down fourth-stage rocket casing orbited as a single unit, to be spun around its long axis at 750 revolutions per minute. Data from these instruments would be transmitted to the ground by a 60 milliwatt transmitter operating on 108.03 MHz and a 10 milliwatt transmitter operating on 108.00 MHz.

Transmitting antennas consisted of two fiberglass slot antennas in the body of the satellite itself. The four flexible whip antennas of Explorer 1 were removed from the design. The external skin of the instrument section was painted in alternate strips of white and dark green to provide passive temperature control of the satellite. The proportions of the light and dark strips were determined by studies of shadow-sunlight intervals based on firing time, trajectory, orbit, and orbital inclination.

Electrical power was provided by Mallory type RM Mercury batteries that made up approximately 40% of the payload weight. These provided power that operated the high power transmitter for 31 days and the low-power transmitter for 105 days. Because of the limited space available and the requirements for low weight, the Explorer 3 instrumentation was designed and built with simplicity and high reliability in mind.

== Launch and orbit ==
Explorer 3 was launched at 17:38:03 GMT on 26 March 1958 from Cape Canaveral Launch Complex 5 via the same type of modified Jupiter-C (Juno 1) as the prior two Explorers. A guidance system orbit placed the satellite into an orbit with a higher apogee and lower perigee than planned: 1,735 mi (2,792 km) and 125 mi (201 km), respectively. The ensuing orbital decay made for a comparatively short lifespan: initial estimates placed it at 4.6 months. In fact, the satellite reentered the atmosphere on 28 June 1958, after just 93 days of operation; by the week before reentry, Explorer 3's apogee had dropped to 375 mi (604 km) and the perigee to 99 mi (159 km).

== Mission results ==
Explorer 3 largely confirmed the findings of Explorer 1, with the same zero count returned above an altitude of around 1,000 km (620 mi) to 1,200 km (750 mi). Because of the consistent results, Van Allen hypothesized that the satellites' equipment might have been saturated by unexpectedly high radiation concentrations, trapped in a belt of charged particles by the Earth's magnetic field. Explorer 4, equipped with a lead-shielded counter, flew in July and confirmed the existence of the radiation fields subsequently known as the Van Allen Belts.

On 7 May 1958, micrometeorites associated with the Eta Aquariids meteor shower ruptured two of Explorer 3's micrometeorite erosion gauges.

== Status ==
A replica of the spacecraft is currently located in the Smithsonian Institution's National Air and Space Museum, Milestones of Flight Gallery.

== See also ==
- Timeline of artificial satellites and space probes
- Explorer program
