= Sirsi Baghel =

Coordinates: 25°06′N 82°34′E

- Village
- Interactive map of Sirsi Baghel
- Country: India
- State: Uttar Pradesh

Government
  - Body: Gram panchayat

Languages
  - Official: Hindi, Urdu, Awadhi, Agariya
- PIN: 231307
- Website: up.gov.in

Sirsi Baghel is a village in Mirzapur, Uttar Pradesh, India.

== Population ==
In 2011 there were 1,837 people living in Sirsi Baghel.
