= Ahirauli Baghel =

- Village
- Interactive map of Ahirauli Baghel
- Country: India
- State: Uttar Pradesh
- District: Deoria

Population (2011)
  - Total: 5,655

Languages
  - Official: Hindi
- Time zone: UTC+5:30 (IST)
- PIN: 274702
- Nearest city: Deoria
- Lok Sabha constituency: Salempur
- Vidhan Sabha constituency: Bhatpar Rani

Ahirauli Baghel is an Indian village located in Uttar Pradesh, India. Ahirauli Baghel comes under Bankata Block of Deoria district. It belongs to Gorakhpur division. It is located 47 KM towards East from district headquarter Deoria. It distance is 374 KM from State capital Lucknow. Bhojpuri and Hindi is the primary language spoken in this village .

== Demographics ==
As of 2011 Indian Census, Ahirauli Baghel had a total population of 5,655 of which 2,848 were males and 2,807 were females. Population within the age group of 0 — 6 years was 795. Which makes up 14.06 % of total population of village. Average Sex Ratio of Ahirauli Baghel village is 986 which is higher than Uttar Pradesh state average of 912. Child Sex Ratio for the Ahirouli Baghel as per census is 836, lower than Uttar Pradesh average of 902. Ahirauli Baghel village has higher literacy rate compared to Uttar Pradesh. In 2011, literacy rate of Ahirauli Baghel village was 75.84 % compared to 67.68 % of Uttar Pradesh. In Ahirauli Baghel Male literacy stands at 88.99 % while female literacy rate was 62.86 %.

== Education ==
The village has two inter colleges, named Sangram Singh Baghel Inter College and Sri Lakhan Ji Inter College. During the 1960s and 1970s, there was hardly a Science faculty school where Science education could be given to students of the area. In 1970s Science education was started in Sangram Singh Baghel Inter College. There is also a girls school which provides education up to the 8th standard named after Former Uttar Pradesh Chief Minister Late Vir Bahadur Singh, a primary school near Baram Baba Dev Sthaan. Village has professional education institute Lalita Devi college of Education offering courses like Bachelor in Education, BTC Training, Pharmacy Education.

== Health ==
A Primary Health Center is located about a half kilometre from the village, with a few hospitals and doctors accessible in a 30 to 40 km range. For more advanced medical facilities, one must go to Deoria, the district centre, and further to Gorakhpur for higher health facilities.
