= Bagal (surname) =

Bagal is a surname. Notable people with the surname include:

- Jogesh Chandra Bagal (1903–1972), Indian journalist, historian and writer
- Madhavrao Bagal (1895–1986), Indian social activist and artist
- Monalisa Bagal (born 1996), Indian film actress
