= Juno I =

Four-stage American expendable launch vehicle (1958)

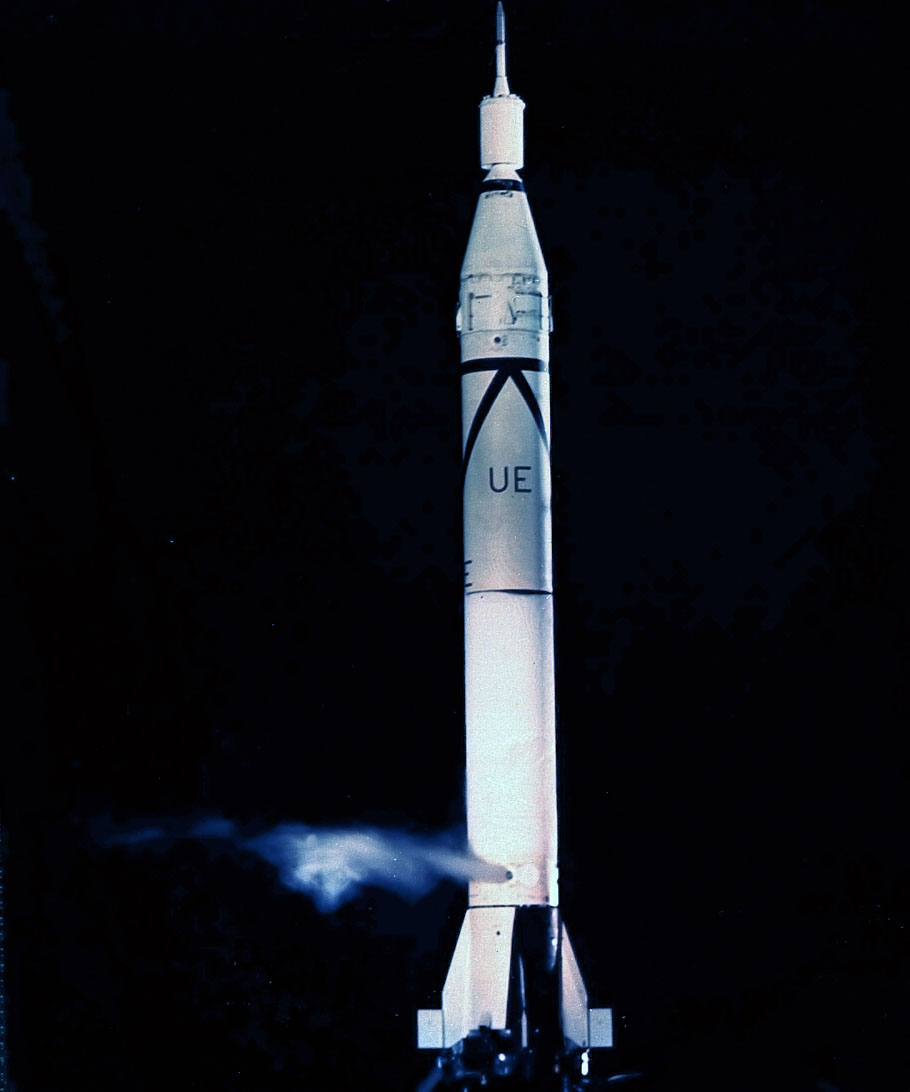
- Juno I awaiting launch with Explorer I
- Function: Orbital launch vehicle
- Manufacturer: Chrysler for the ABMA
- Country of origin: United States

Size
- Height: 21.2 m (70 ft)
- Diameter: 1.78 m (5 ft 10 in)
- Mass: 29,060 kg (64,070 lb)
- Stages: 4

Capacity

Payload to LEO
- Mass: 11 kg (24 lb)

Launch history
- Status: Retired
- Launch sites: LC-5 and 26A, Cape Canaveral Missile Annex, Florida
- Total launches: 6
- Success(es): 3
- Failure: 3
- First flight: 1 February 1958, 03:47:56 GMT
- Last flight: October 23, 1959

First stage – Redstone (stretched)
- Powered by: 1 Rocketdyne A-7
- Maximum thrust: 42,439 kg_{f} (416.18 kN; 93,560 lb_{f})
- Specific impulse: 235 s (2.30 km/s)
- Burn time: 155 seconds
- Propellant: Hydyne/LOX

Second stage – Baby Sergeant cluster
- Powered by: 11 Solid
- Maximum thrust: 7,480 kg_{f} (73.4 kN; 16,500 lb_{f})
- Specific impulse: 220 s (2.2 km/s)
- Burn time: 6 seconds
- Propellant: Polysulfide-aluminum and ammonium perchlorate (Solid)

Third stage – Baby Sergeant cluster
- Powered by: 3 Solid
- Maximum thrust: 2,040 kg_{f} (20.0 kN; 4,500 lb_{f})
- Specific impulse: 236 s (2.31 km/s)
- Burn time: 6 seconds
- Propellant: Polysulfide-aluminum and ammonium perchlorate (Solid)

Fourth stage – Baby Sergeant
- Powered by: 1 Solid
- Maximum thrust: 680 kg_{f} (6.7 kN; 1,500 lb_{f})
- Specific impulse: 249 s (2.44 km/s)
- Burn time: 6 seconds
- Propellant: Polysulfide-aluminum and ammonium perchlorate (Solid)

The Juno I is a series of a four-stage American space launch vehicle that was used to launch lightweight payloads into low Earth orbit from January 1958 to October 1958. The launch vehicle is a member of the Redstone launch vehicle family, and was derived from the Jupiter-C sounding rocket. It is commonly confused with the Juno II launch vehicle, which was derived from the PGM-19 Jupiter medium-range ballistic missile. In 1958, a Juno I launch vehicle was used to launch America's first satellite, Explorer 1.

== History ==
Developed as a part of the Explorer Project, the original goal for the launch vehicle was to place an artificial satellite into orbit. Following the Soviet Union's launch of Sputnik 1 on October 4, 1957 (and the resulting "Sputnik crisis") and the failure of the Vanguard 1 launch attempt, the program received funding to match the Soviet space achievements. The launch vehicle family name was suggested in November 1957 by Jet Propulsion Laboratory (JPL) Director Dr. William Pickering, who proposed the name Juno, after the Roman goddess and queen of the gods, as well as for its position as the satellite-launching version of the Jupiter-C. The fourth stage for the Juno I launch vehicle was derived following the September 1956 test launch of a Jupiter-C for the Army Ballistic Missile Agency, which could have been the world's first satellite launch, had a fourth stage been loaded and fueled. A fourth stage would have allowed the nose cone to overshoot the target and enter orbit.

The first launch of a Juno I launch vehicle was in early 1958, with the successful launch of Explorer 1 satellite on February 1, 1958, at 03:47:56 GMT, after the Soviet Union's Sputnik 1 on October 4, 1957. The launch had been scheduled for January 29, 1958, but was scrubbed twice. Explorer 1 was the first successful U.S. satellite, and it confirmed the existence of the Van Allen radiation belt. Following the first successful launch, five more Juno I launch attempts occurred with two successes and three failures. The final launch attempt was on October 23, 1958, from Cape Canaveral Launch Pad 5, which ended in failure.

== Launch vehicle ==
Juno I diagram

The Juno I consisted of a Jupiter-C first stage, based on the Redstone missile; with three additional solid fuel stages based on the Sergeant missile to provide the added impulse to achieve orbit. The fourth stage was mounted on top of the "tub" of the third stage, and fired after third-stage burnout to boost the payload and fourth stage to an orbital velocity of 8 km/s (5.0 mi/s), with an acceleration of 25–51 g. The tub along with the fourth stage were set spinning while the launch vehicle was on the launch pad to provide gyroscopic force in lieu of a guidance system that would have required thrust vectoring, vernier thrusters, or a reaction control system. The booster guidance package (with the tub attached) separated from the first stage after burnout to provide attitude control until second stage ignition. This multi-stage system, designed by Wernher von Braun in 1956 for his proposed Project Orbiter, obviated the need for a guidance system in the upper stages. It was the simplest method for putting a payload into orbit but having no upper-stage guidance, the payload could not achieve a precise orbit. Both the four-stage Juno I and three-stage Jupiter-C launch vehicles were the same height (21.2 m (70 ft)), with the added fourth-stage booster of the Juno I being enclosed inside the nose cone of the third stage.

== Launch history ==
Juno I was launched six times by Army Ballistic Missile Agency (ABMA) in 1958, intending to place satellites in low Earth orbit.

Following the successful launch of Explorer 1 on February 1, 1958, the first U.S. satellite, Juno I made five more launches before being retired in favor of Juno II. Although Juno I's launch of the Explorer 1 satellite was a huge success for the U.S. space program, only two of its remaining five flights were successful, Explorer 3 and Explorer 4, giving the Juno I vehicle a mission total success ratio of 50%. The Juno I vehicle was replaced by the Juno II in 1959.

The designation painted on the sides of the rocket was inherited from Jupiter-C, where the sequence of manufacture of the rockets (which are not necessarily launched in order, and may be uprated as solutions to technical problems are worked out in tests) was considered a military secret. So the designation employed a simple transformation cypher based on the name of the design and test base: Huntsville, Alabama, giving HUNTSVILE, with duplicated letters dropped. This way H was used for 1, U for 2, ..., E for 9 and X for 0. Thus the "UE" painted on the side of the Juno I that launched Explorer 1 indicates it was S/N 29 (U→2, E→9).

The American public was happy and relieved that America had finally managed to launch a satellite after the launch failures in the Vanguard and Viking series. With the relative success of the Juno I program, von Braun developed the Juno II, using a PGM-19 Jupiter first stage, rather than a Redstone.

Juno I launches
Flight No.	Date / time (GMT)	Rocket	Launch site	Payload	Payload mass	Outcome	Comments
1	February 1, 1958; 03:47:56	Juno I RS-29 (UE)	LC-26A	Explorer 1	22 kg	Success	Maiden launch of Juno I. First American satellite launched. Explorer 1 ceased transmission of data on May 23, 1958, when its batteries died, but remained in orbit for more than 12 years. It made a fiery reentry over the Pacific Ocean on March 31, 1970.
2	March 5, 1958; 18:27:57	Juno I RS-26 (UV)	LC-26A	Explorer 2	23 kg	Failure	Fourth stage did not ignite.
3	March 26, 1958; 17:38:03	Juno I RS-24 (UT)	LC-5	Explorer 3	23 kg	Success	Decay from orbit on June 28, 1958.
4	July 26, 1958; 15:00:57	Juno I RS-44 (TT)	LC-5	Explorer 4	29 kg	Success	Decay from orbit on October 23, 1959.
5	August 24, 1958; 06:17:22	Juno I RS-47 (TI)	LC-5	Explorer 5	29 kg	Failure	Booster collided with second stage after separation, causing upper stage firing angle to be off.
6	October 23, 1958; 03:21:04	Juno I RS-49 (incorrectly labeled HE instead of TE)	LC-5	Beacon 1	23 kg	Failure	Five stage version, Second stage separated prematurely from booster.

=== Gallery ===
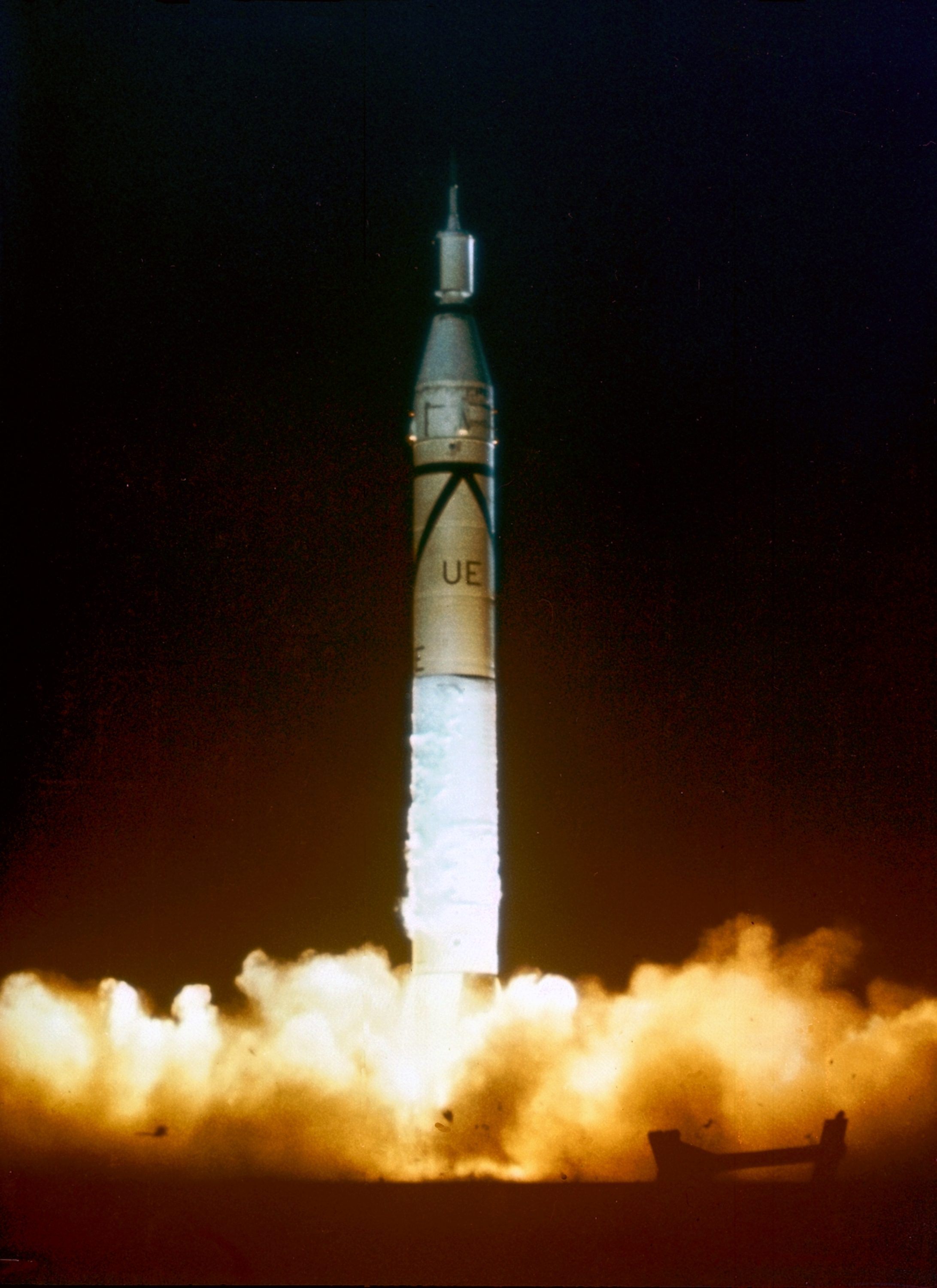
Juno I RS-29 UE launching Explorer 1

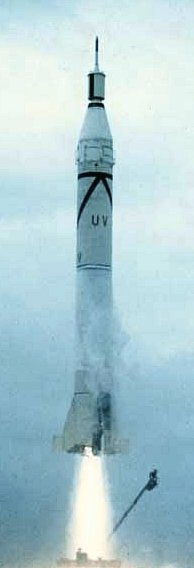
Juno I RS-26 UV launching Explorer 2

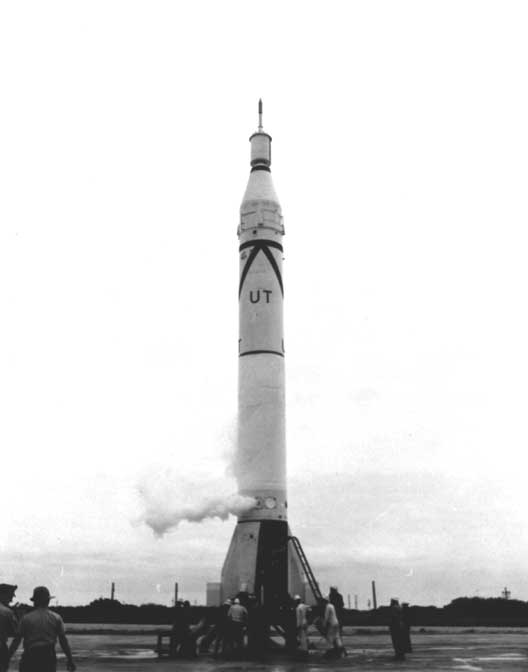
Juno I RS-24 UT launching Explorer 3

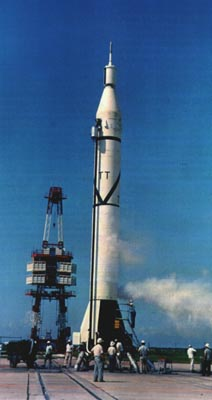
Juno I RS-44 TT with Explorer 4

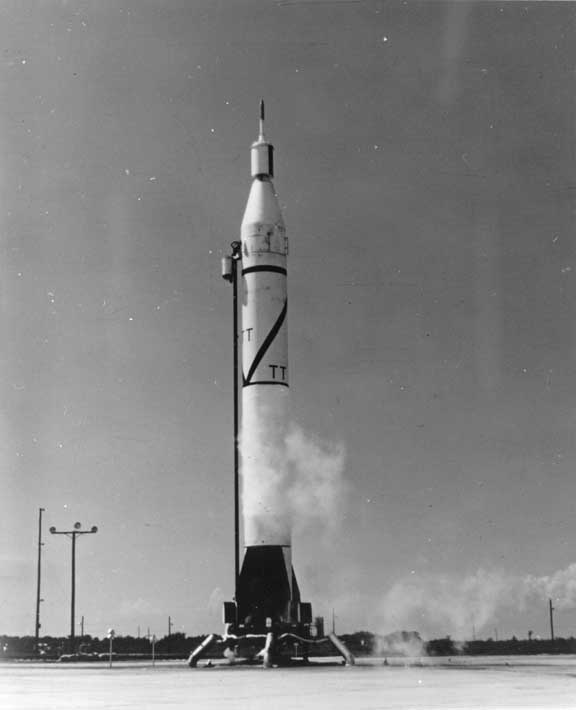
Juno I RS-44 TT launching Explorer 4

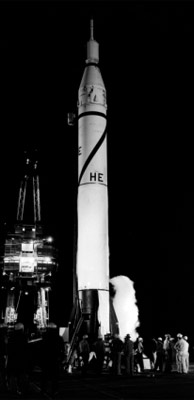
Juno I RS-49 HE with BEACON 1

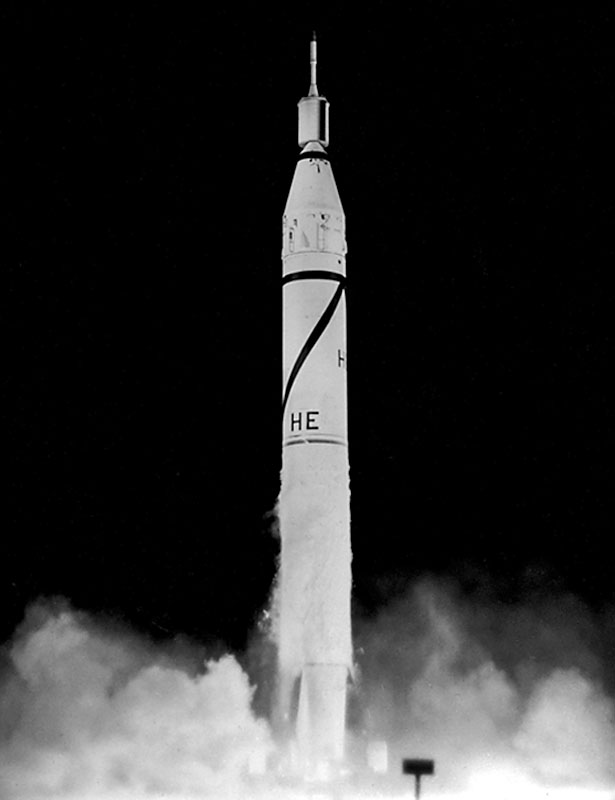
Juno I RS-49 HE launching BEACON 1

== On display ==
Juno I are displayed at:

- Kennedy Space Center rocket garden, with Explorer 1 mock-up
- National Air and Space Museum, labeled as Jupiter-C but with a Explorer 1 mock-up
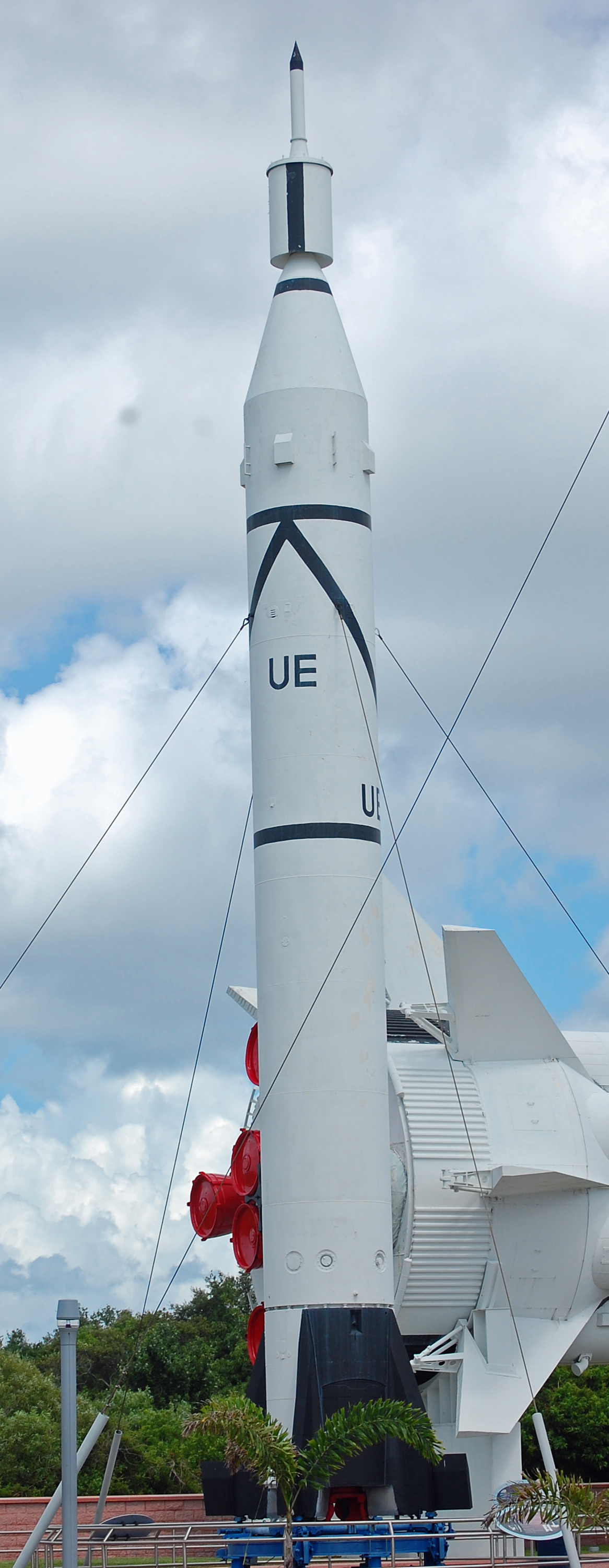
Juno I at the Kennedy Space Center rocket garden

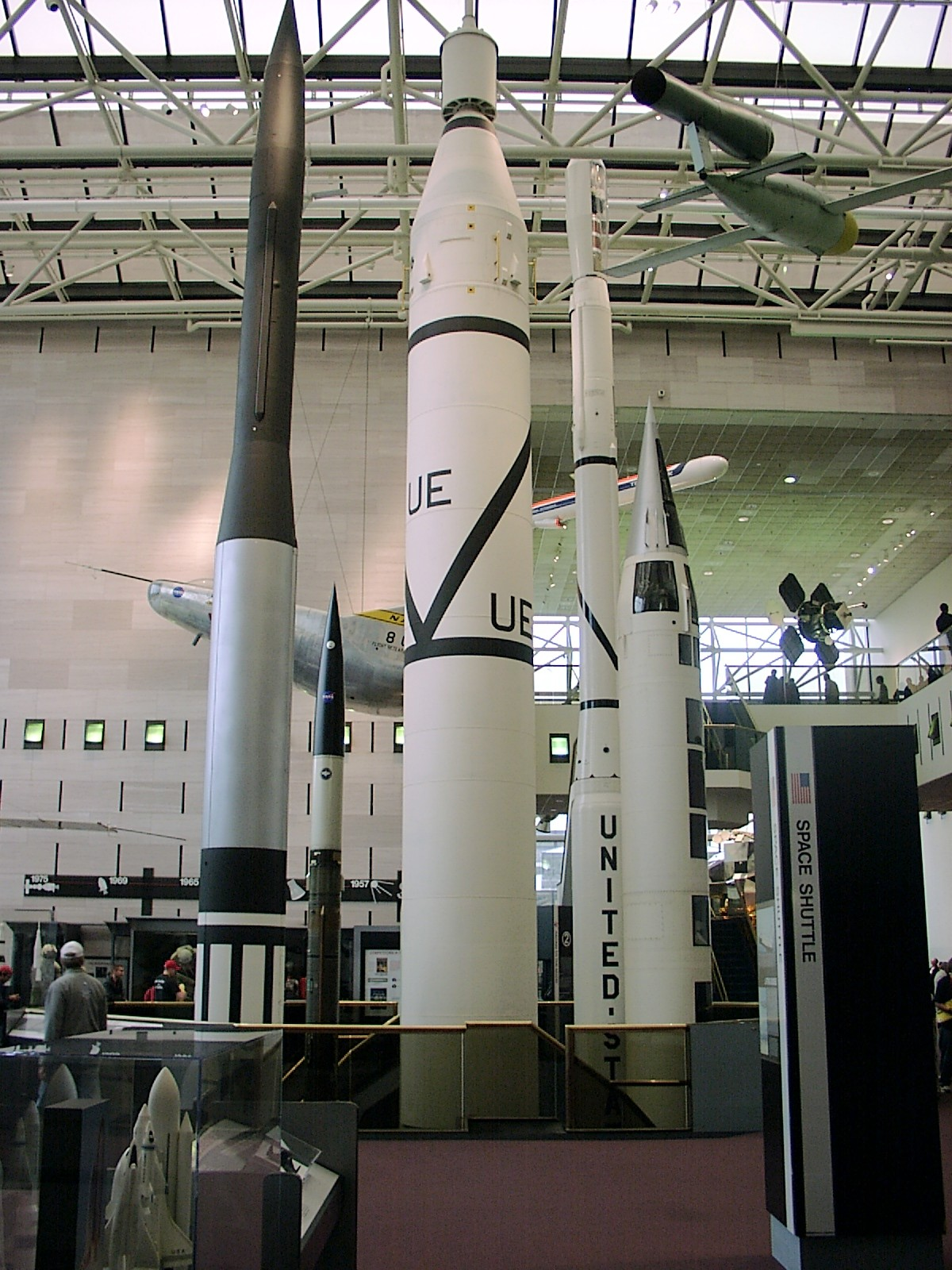
Juno I at the National Air and Space Museum

== See also ==
- Juno II
- Jupiter-C
- PGM-19 Jupiter
