= Hydyne =

Liquid rocket fuel

Hydyne is a mixture of 60% unsymmetrical dimethylhydrazine (UDMH) and 40% diethylenetriamine (DETA), developed in 1957 at Rocketdyne for use in liquid-fuel rockets. Hydyne was used as the fuel for the first stage of the Juno I rocket that launched Explorer 1, the first successful satellite launch conducted by the United States. As part of Mixed Amine Fuel series of rocket fuels, it was designated as MAF-4.

== Improved performance ==
In 1955, Wernher von Braun, employed by the U.S. Army, calculated his Redstone rocket could launch a satellite into orbit if its performance could be improved. A contract to develop a more powerful propellant was awarded to the Redstone's main stage builder, Rocketdyne. The contract required the replacement of the PGM-11 Redstone fuel (including 25% water and 75% ethyl alcohol) with a compound that would boost the rocket's performance by at least 8%. Mary Sherman Morgan was assigned to head up a small team of engineers to find a solution.

The Jupiter-C and Juno I rockets used the same first-stage engines as the missile, but needed more thrust due to the increased size of the payload. With the use of the newly developed Hydyne, composed of a blend of 60% unsymmetrical dimethylhydrazine (UDMH) and 40% diethylenetriamine (DETA), the Jupiter-C and Juno I engines gained a 12% increase in thrust and higher specific impulse. The resulting fuel was more powerful than alcohol, but also more toxic. The first Hydyne-powered Redstone R&D flight took place on November 29, 1956. After two Jupiter C and six Juno I launches including the launch of America's first satellite, Explorer I), Hydyne was discontinued in favor of higher performing fuels.

== Unofficial name ==
'Bagel' was the whimsical name suggested by Morgan, who engineered the Hydyne-LOX (Liquid OXygen) propellant combination used by North American Aviation in their early U.S. rocket designs of the incipient space race. Morgan was considered a rocketry pioneer as she was the only female technical analyst employed by NAA in Downey, California. Morgan suggested calling her new fuel invention 'Bagel', allowing the Redstone propellant combination to be then called 'Bagel and LOX' (a tongue in cheek reference to the brined salmon, lox, which is served with bagels and cream cheese). Her suggested name for the new fuel was not accepted, and 'Hydyne' was chosen instead by the U.S. Army.

== Popular culture ==
The creation of Hydyne was dramatized in a stage play entitled Rocket Girl which chronicles the life of Mary Sherman Morgan, Hydyne's inventor. The play was written by Morgan's son, George D. Morgan and ran at the California Institute of Technology in November, 2008, . The story is also told in Rocket Girl: The Story of Mary Sherman Morgan, America's First Female Rocket Scientist also by George D. Morgan.
