= Küttner =

Küttner is a German surname. Notable people with the surname include:

- Kurt Küttner (1907–1964), German SS officer
- Joachim Kuettner (1909–2011), German-American atmospheric scientist

== See also ==
- Kuttner
