= Kuttner =

Kuttner is a German surname. Notable people with the surname include:

- Amita Kuttner (born 1990), Canadian astrophysicist and politician
- Brian Kuttner (1908–1992), English mathematician
- Henry Kuttner (1915–1958), American author of science fiction, fantasy and horror
- Josua Heschel Kuttner (c. 1803 – 1878), Jewish Orthodox scholar and rabbi
- Kurt Küttner (1907–1964), German SS officer
- Robert Kuttner (born 1943), American journalist and writer
- Robert E. Kuttner (1927–1987), American biologist
- Sarah Kuttner (born 1979), German television presenter and writer
- Stuart Kuttner (born 1939 or 1940), former newspaper editor
- Stephan Kuttner (1907–1996), German law expert

== See also ==
- Henry Kuttner deities supernatural entities created for the Cthulhu Mythos universe
- Sarah Kuttner – Die Show, German television talk show
- Kutner, a surname
- Küttner, a surname
