= Redstone 2 =

Redstone 2 may refer to:

- Mercury-Redstone 2, a 1961 test spaceflight
- Redstone 2, codename for Windows 10 Creators Update, released on 11 April 2017.
