= Indulata Sukla =

Indian mathematician (1944–2022)

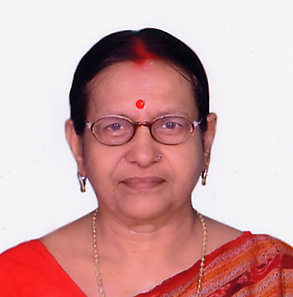
- Born: 7 March 1944; Baripada, Mayurbhanj State, British Raj (now Odisha)
- Died: 30 June 2022 (aged 78)
- Education: M.P.C. College, Baripada (B.Sc.); Ravenshaw College, Cuttack (M.Sc.); Jabalpur University, Jabalpur (Ph.D.)
- Occupation: Mathematician
- Employer(s): Sambalpur University, Sambalpur, Odisha (Former Professor of Mathematics)
- Known for: Number Theory, Cryptography, Analysis
- Spouse: Ananta Charan Sukla

Indulata L. Sukla (7 March 1944 – 30 June 2022) was an Indian academic, who was professor of mathematics for more than three decades at Sambalpur University, Sambalpur, Odisha.

She did her schooling from Maharani Prem Kumari Girls’ School and B.Sc. with Mathematics Honours from M.P.C. College, Baripada. She completed her M.Sc. in Mathematics from Ravenshaw College, Cuttack in 1966, and had a brief stint as a lecturer in M.P.C. College, before moving to the University of Jabalpur with a CSIR Fellowship to pursue Ph.D. under the supervision of Tribikram Pati. While pursuing her researches, she joined Sambalpur University in November 1970 as a lecturer in the School of Mathematical Sciences, and continued there till her retirement in March 2004.

She is the author of the textbook Number Theory and Its Applications to Cryptography (Cuttack: Kalyani Publishers, 2000). In her research, she worked with English mathematician Brian Kuttner on Fourier Series. She was a Life Member of the American Mathematical Society (AMS) and the Indian Mathematical Society (IMS).

== Awards and honours ==
The Orissa Mathematical Society (OMS) gave her the Lifetime Achievement Award for her work in Number Theory, Cryptography and Analysis. She received the award from Professor Ramachandran Balasubramanian, Director of the Institute of Mathematical Sciences, Chennai at the 42nd Annual Conference of OMS held at Vyasanagar Autonomous College, Jajpur Road, Orissa on 7 February 2015.

== Selected publications ==
- Sukla, Indulata (1982), "A Tauberian theorem for strong Abel summability type", Proceedings of the American Mathematical Society, 84 (2): 185–191, doi:10.2307/2043662, JSTOR 2043662, MR 0637166.
- Kuttner, B.; Sukla, I. L. (1985), "On $({\mathcal{D}},h(n))$ summability methods", Mathematical Proceedings of the Cambridge Philosophical Society, 97 (2): 189–193, Bibcode:1985MPCPS..97..189K, doi:10.1017/S0305004100062745, MR 0771813.
