= Kutner =

Kutner is a surname which may refer to:

== People ==
- Bel Kutner (born 1970), Brazilian actress and theater director
- Beverley Martyn (1947–2026), née Kutner, English folk musician
- David Kutner, pen name of Aron Skrobek (1889–1943), Polish trade unionist and journalist
- Eugénie Sokolnicka (1884–1934), née Kutner, French psychoanalyst
- Lawrence Kutner (psychologist), American child psychologist
- Luis Kutner (1908–1993), American human rights activist, FBI and CIA informant, and lawyer
- Malcolm Kutner (1921–2005), American football player
- Rob Kutner, American screenwriter
- Robert Kutner (1867–1913), German urologist
- Lawrence Kutner (psychologist), American child psychologist
- Marc Kutner, birth name of Marc Stevens (1943–1989), American pornographic actor
- Yoav Kutner, Israeli music editor and producer

== Fictional characters ==
- Lawrence Kutner (House), fictional doctor on the television program House

== See also ==
- Kuttner, a surname
- Solomon Cutner (1902–1988), British pianist
