= Mercury-Redstone BD =

Additional uncrewed booster development flight

Mercury-Redstone Booster Development
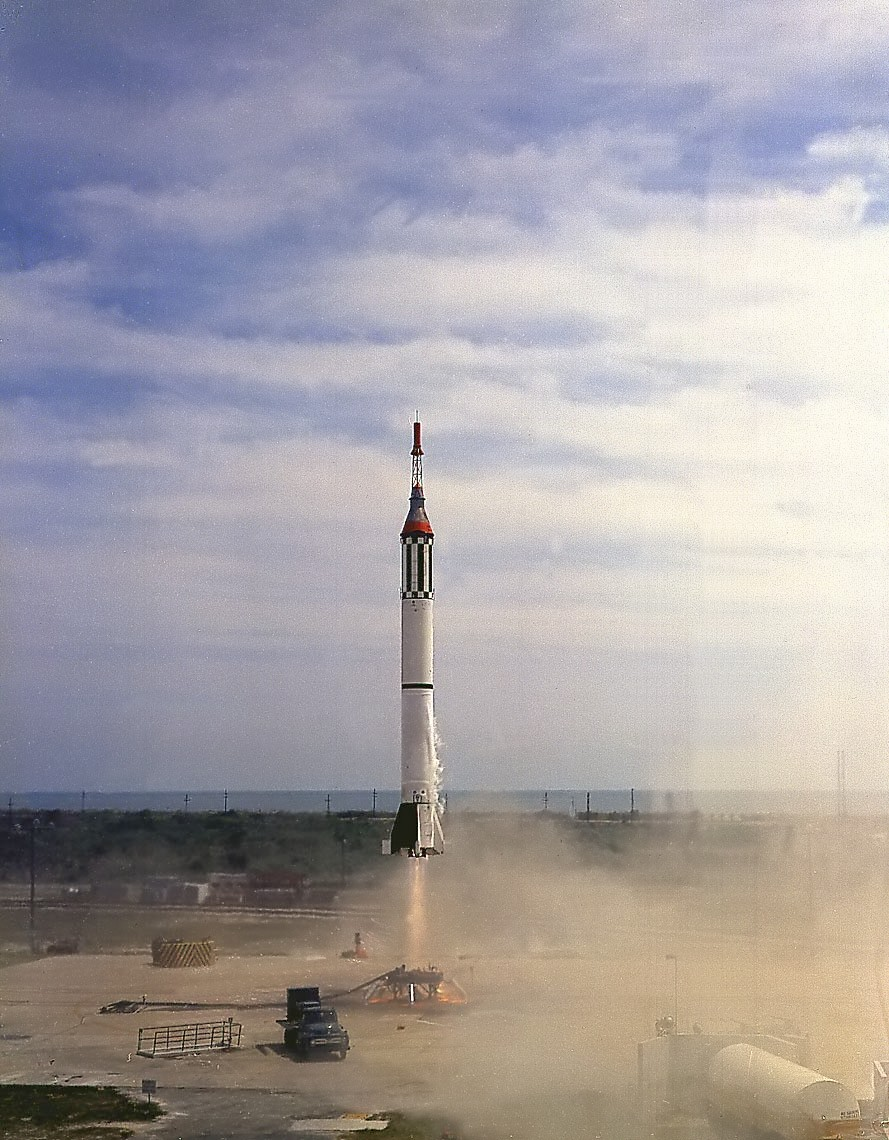
- Mercury Redstone BD launch
- Mission type: Test flight
- Operator: NASA
- Mission duration: 8 minutes, 23 seconds
- Distance travelled: 494 kilometres (307 mi)
- Apogee: 182.7 kilometres (113.5 mi)

Spacecraft properties
- Spacecraft type: Mercury boilerplate
- Manufacturer: McDonnell Aircraft
- Launch mass: 1,141 kilograms (2,515 lb)

Start of mission
- Launch date: March 24, 1961, 17:30 UTC
- Rocket: Redstone MRLV MR-5
- Launch site: Cape Canaveral LC-5

End of mission
- Landing date: March 24, 1961, 17:38:23 UTC
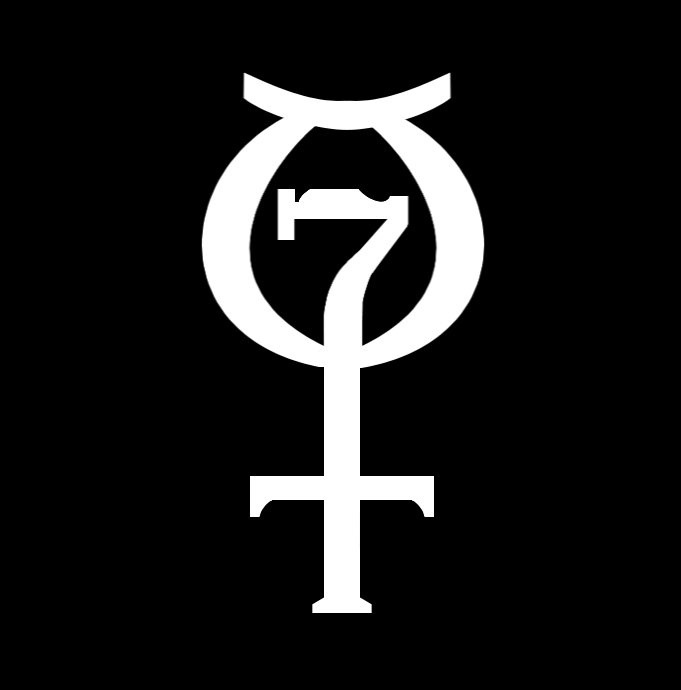
- Project Mercury; Mercury-Redstone series

Mercury-Redstone BD was an uncrewed booster development flight in the U.S. Mercury program. It was launched on March 24, 1961, from Launch Complex 5 at Cape Canaveral, Florida. The mission used a boilerplate Mercury spacecraft and Redstone MRLV-5.

After the problems that developed during the MR-2 mission carrying the chimpanzee Ham, it was apparent that the Redstone needed further development before it could be trusted to carry a human passenger.

Dr. Wernher von Braun added Mercury-Redstone BD (Booster Development) to the launch schedule between the MR-2 and MR-3 missions. This went over the protests of some, including astronaut Alan Shepard, who argued that the problems on MR-2 had been quickly identified and easily fixed. Von Braun was adamant that the Redstone could not be considered man-rated until a perfect test flight and that the launch vehicle performance on MR-1A and MR-2 had not met acceptable standards for carrying a human passenger.

The cause of previous Redstone rocket over-accelerations was a servo valve that did not properly regulate the flow of hydrogen peroxide to the steam generator. This in turn overpowered the fuel pumps. The thrust regulator and velocity integrator were modified on the MR-BD and later Mercury-Redstone rockets to prevent them from exceeding the speed limit again. Other modifications were made to prevent engine cutoff from propellant depletion rather than a programmed signal, which had led to an inadvertent abort and Launch Escape System (LES) activation on MR-2.

Another problem encountered in previous Mercury-Redstone flights were harmonic vibrations induced by aerodynamic stress in the topmost section of the elongated Redstone. To fix this problem, four stiffeners were added to the ballast section and 210 pounds (95 kg) of insulation was applied to the inner skin of the upper part of the Mercury Redstone instrument compartment.

The mission used a boilerplate Mercury spacecraft with an inert escape rocket. The spacecraft also did not have a retro package or posigrade rockets.

The MR-BD mission lasted eight minutes and 23 seconds. It reached an apogee of 113.5 miles (182.7 km) and a range of 307 miles (494 km). The peak velocity was 5,123 mph (8,245 km/h). The spacecraft experienced a peak load of 11 g (108 m/s²). There was no intention to separate the Redstone rocket and boilerplate Mercury spacecraft and they impacted together 307 miles (494 km) downrange, 5 miles (8.0 km) short of the plan. They sank to the bottom of the Atlantic Ocean, exploding a sofar bomb en route. Booster performance was excellent other than some vibration issues in the adapter area.

MR-BD was highly successful and led the way to the flight of Alan Shepard aboard MR-3.

== Trivia ==
In the USSR, the mission was erroneously recognized as failure:

The Commander reported that the Americans are planning to fly into space on April 28. I told him that they will not launch a man before us. On March 24 they had a big failure: capsule "Mercury" failed to separate from the carrier and sank in the ocean.

— Nikolai Kamanin, Hidden space//Year 1961//April 7
