= Mercury-Redstone Launch Vehicle =

1960s American crewed suborbital rocket

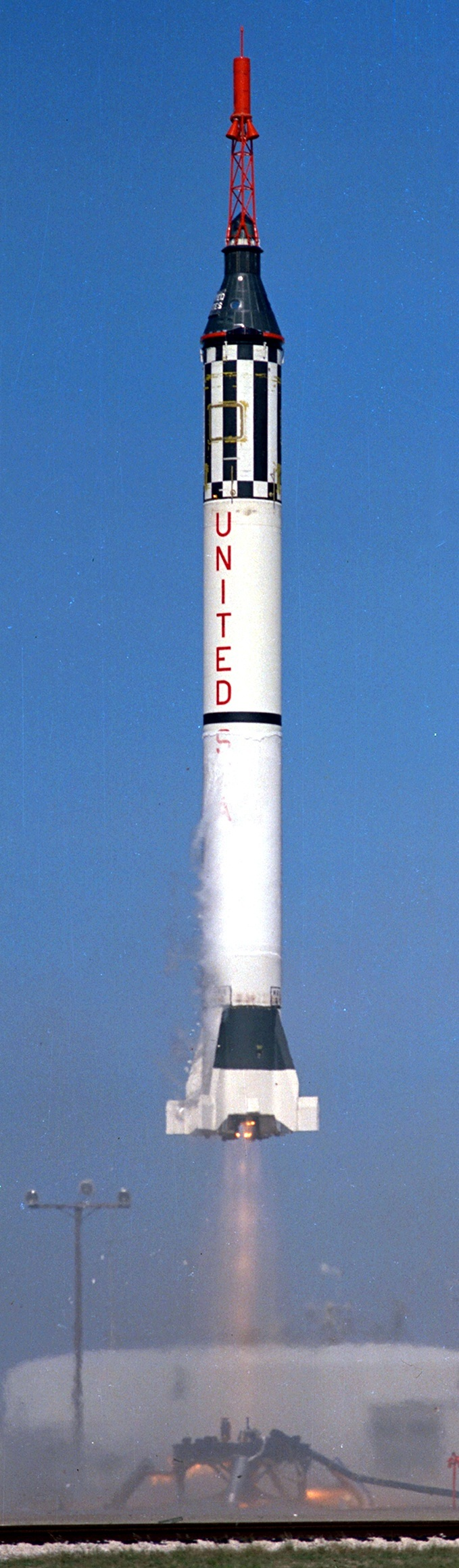
- Mercury-Redstone 2 launch carrying Ham, a chimpanzee, on 31 January 1961
- Function: Human-rated sub-orbital launch vehicle
- Manufacturer: Chrysler Corporation
- Country of origin: United States

Size
- Height: 25.41 m (83.38 ft)
- Diameter: 1.78 m (5.83 ft)
- Mass: 30,000 kg (66,000 lb)
- Stages: 1

Capacity

Payload to sub-orbital trajectory
- Mass: 1,800 kg (4,000 lb)

Launch history
- Status: Retired
- Launch sites: Launch Complex 5, Cape Canaveral, Florida
- Total launches: 6
- Success(es): 5
- Failure: 1
- First flight: 21 November 1960
- Last flight: 21 July 1961
- Carries passengers or cargo: Mercury spacecraft

Single stage
- Powered by: 1 Rocketdyne A-7
- Maximum thrust: 350 kN (78,000 lbf)
- Specific impulse: 215 s (2.11 km/s)
- Burn time: 143.5 s
- Propellant: LOX/ethyl alcohol

The Mercury-Redstone Launch Vehicle, designed for NASA's Project Mercury, was the first American crewed space booster. It was used for six sub-orbital Mercury flights in 1960 and 1961, culminating with the launch of the first and, eleven weeks later, the second Americans (and the second and third humans) in space. The four subsequent Mercury human spaceflights used the more powerful Atlas booster to enter low Earth orbit.

A member of the Redstone rocket family, it was derived from the U.S. Army's Redstone ballistic missile and the first stage of the related Jupiter-C launch vehicle; but to human-rate it, the structure and systems were modified to improve safety and reliability.

== Modifications from the Redstone missile ==
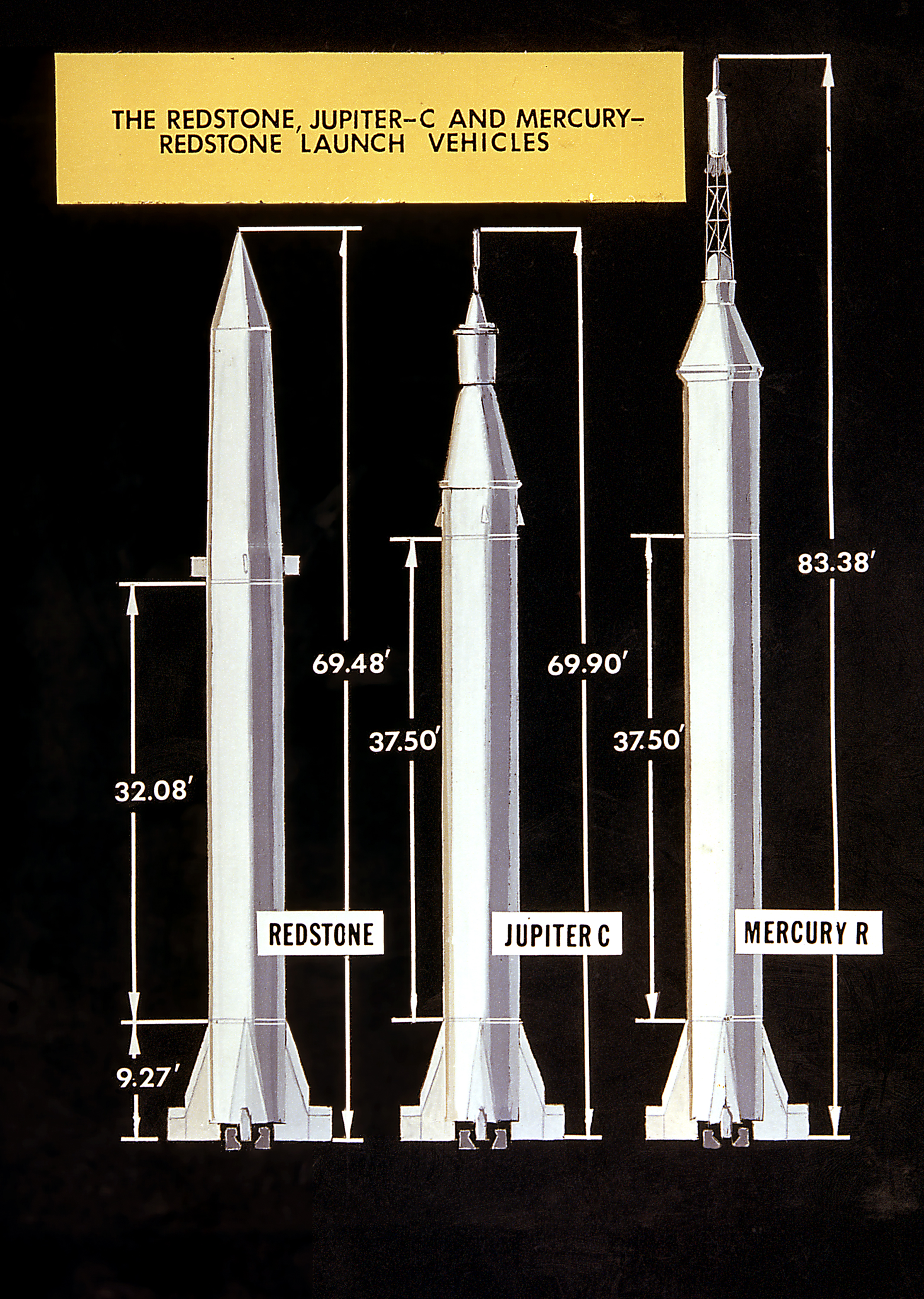
Comparison of Mercury-Redstone (right) with Redstone missile and Jupiter-C

NASA chose the U.S. Army's Redstone liquid-fueled ballistic missile for its sub-orbital flights as it was the oldest one in the US fleet, having been active since 1953 and had many successful test flights.

Though the standard military Redstone lacked sufficient thrust to lift a Mercury capsule into the ballistic suborbital trajectory needed for the project, the first stage of the Jupiter-C, a modified Redstone with lengthened tanks, could carry enough propellant to reach the desired trajectory. Therefore, the Jupiter-C first stage was used as the starting point for the Mercury-Redstone design. The Jupiter-C's engine, however, was being phased out by the Army, so, to avoid potential complications such as parts shortages or design revisions, the Mercury-Redstone designers chose the Rocketdyne A-7 engine used on the latest military Redstone. Hans Paul and William Davidson, propulsion engineers at the Army Ballistic Missile Agency (ABMA), were assigned the task of modifying the A-7 to be safe and reliable for crewed flights.

During 1959, most of ABMA were preoccupied with the Saturn project, but those engineers who could find enough free time in their schedule were invited to work on man-rating the Jupiter-C. As a starting point, the most obvious step was getting rid of its staging capability as the Mercury-Redstone would not utilize upper stages. Many of the more advanced Jupiter-C components were also removed for reliability reasons or because they were not necessary for Project Mercury.

The standard Redstone was fueled with 25% water–75% ethyl alcohol with liquid oxygen (LOX) used as the oxidizer, essentially the same propellants as the German V-2 missile, but the Jupiter-C first stage had used hydyne fuel, a blend of 60% unsymmetrical dimethylhydrazine (UDMH) and 40% diethylenetriamine (DETA). This was a more powerful fuel than ethyl alcohol, but it was also more toxic, which could be hazardous for an astronaut in a launch pad emergency. Furthermore, hydyne had never been used with the new A-7 engine. The Mercury-Redstone designers rejected hydyne and returned to the standard ethyl alcohol fuel. The lengthened propellant tanks were thus also necessary in lieu of using more powerful fuel.

Use of alcohol created a problem with the Mercury-Redstone in that the graphite thrust vector vanes could be eroded due to the significantly longer burn time, so NASA put out a requirement that the launch vehicles be equipped with high-quality vanes.

Because Mercury-Redstone had larger propellant tanks than the Redstone missile, an additional nitrogen bottle was added for tank pressurization, and an extra hydrogen peroxide tank for powering the turbopump due to the longer burn time.

The most important change in making the Mercury-Redstone suitable for an astronaut was the addition of an automatic in-flight abort sensing system. If a catastrophic failure of the rocket were imminent, the launch escape system attached to the Mercury capsule would be activated, rapidly lifting the capsule from the booster. Either the astronaut or the ground controllers could initiate an abort manually, but some potential failures during flight might lead to disaster before an abort could be manually triggered.

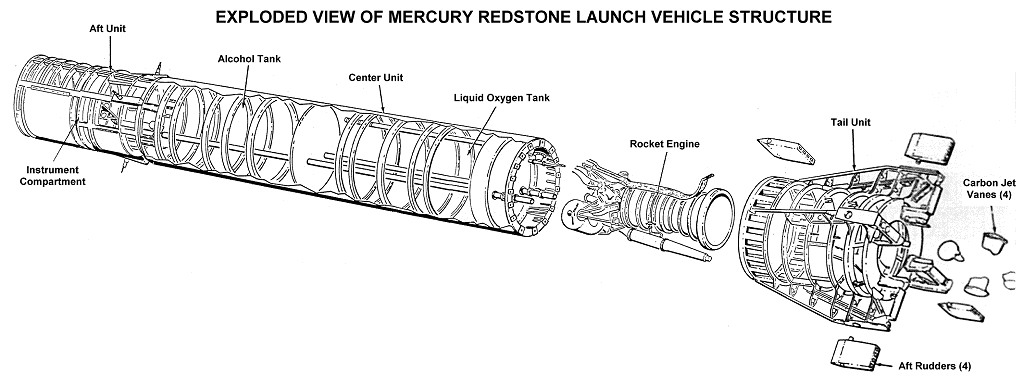
Exploded view

The Mercury-Redstone's automatic in-flight abort sensing system solved this problem by monitoring the rocket's performance during flight. If it detected an anomaly which might threaten the astronaut, such as loss of flight control, engine thrust, or electrical power, it would automatically abort, shutting down the engine and activating the capsule's escape system. The abort system could not shut off the engine until at least 30 seconds after liftoff in order to prevent a malfunctioning launch vehicle from coming down on or near the pad; during the first 30 seconds, only the Range Safety Officer could terminate the flight. Review of flight data from the more than 60 Redstone and Jupiter C launches since 1953 was used to analyze the most likely failure modes of this launch vehicle family. The abort sensing system had to be kept as simple as possible, monitoring only those parameters that were vital to booster operation. An automatic abort could be triggered by the following conditions, any of which could indicate a catastrophic malfunction:

- Pitch, yaw, or roll angle deviating too far from the programmed flight profile;
- Pitch or yaw angle changing too rapidly;
- Pressure in the engine's combustion chamber falling below a critical level;
- Loss of electrical power for the flight control system; or
- Loss of general electrical power (including power for the abort sensing system itself).

Instant abort capability was important because certain failure modes such as loss of thrust upon liftoff (for example the third Redstone test flight in May 1954) could result in an immediate catastrophic situation. Other failure modes such as deviation from the proper flight path or a drop in engine chamber pressure during ascent did not necessarily present an immediate risk to the astronaut's safety. He could initiate a manual abort by pulling a lever in the capsule to activate the Launch Escape System, or ground control could send a command to activate it.

The range safety system was modified slightly in that a three-second delay would take place between engine cutoff and missile destruct so as to give the escape tower enough time to pull the capsule away.

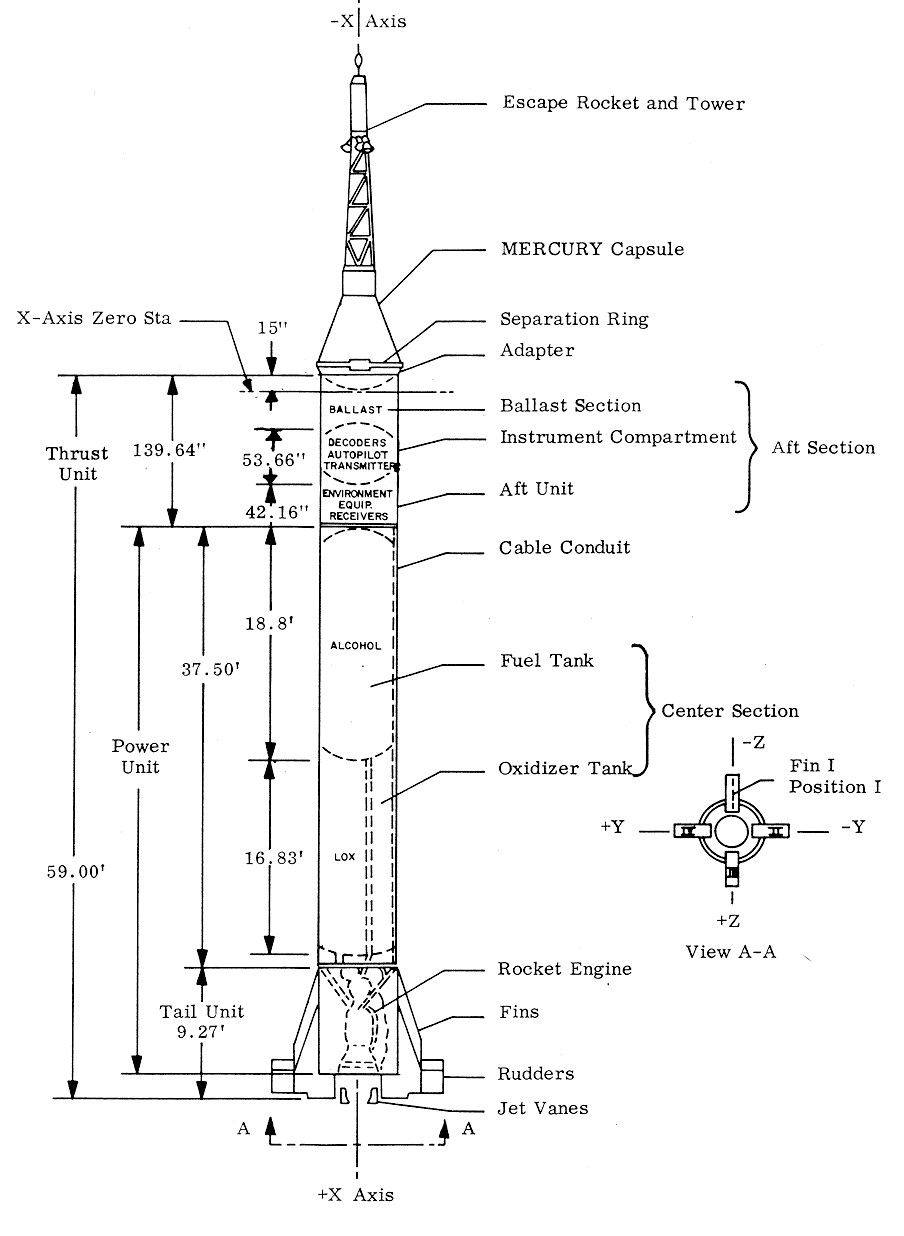
Schematic view

The most visible difference between the Jupiter-C first stage and the Mercury-Redstone was in the section just below the Mercury capsule and above the propellant tanks. This section was known as the aft section, a term which was inherited from the military Redstone. (The actual rear end of the rocket was called the tail section.) The aft section held most of the Mercury-Redstone's electronics and instrumentation, including the guidance system, as well as the adapter for the Mercury capsule. In the military Redstone and the Jupiter-C first stage, when the rocket had burned out, its lower portion, containing the rocket engine and propellant tanks, would separate from the aft section and be discarded, and the aft section, with its guidance system, would direct the top half of the rocket during its unpowered ballistic flight. However, in the Mercury-Redstone, the aft section was permanently attached to the lower portion of the rocket. When the rocket had shut down, the Mercury capsule would separate from the aft section and would rely on its own guidance.

Other changes were made to improve the Mercury-Redstone's reliability. The standard Redstone's ST-80 inertial guidance system was replaced in the Mercury-Redstone with the simpler LEV-3 autopilot. The LEV-3, whose design dated back to the German V-2, was not as sophisticated or as precise as the ST-80, but it was accurate enough for the Mercury mission and its simplicity made it more reliable. A special instrument compartment was built in the "aft section" to hold the most important instrumentation and electronics, including the guidance system, the abort and destruct systems, the telemetry instrumentation, and the electrical power supplies. To reduce the chance of failure in this equipment, this compartment was cooled before launch and kept pressurized during flight.

The fuel prevalves were deleted from the Mercury-Redstone in the interest of improved reliability, since, if they closed during a launch, an abort condition could be triggered. On the three uncrewed flights, it was discovered that the Mercury-Redstone exhibited a roll transient of 8° per second versus 4° for the Redstone missile. Although this was below the 12° per second roll transient required to trigger an abort, the roll rate sensor was removed from the two crewed flights to reduce the chances of an accidental abort (the booster still retained the roll attitude angle sensor which would be triggered at 10°).

Mercury-Redstone 1A and Mercury-Redstone 2 both experienced overacceleration in flight, the former due to a problem with an accelerometer, the latter due to a problem with the LOX regulator which oversupplied the engine with oxidizer and caused thrust termination to occur 1.2 seconds early. The ASIS system activated and the escape tower yanked the capsule away, subjecting Ham, its chimpanzee passenger, to high G loads. The third flight, Mercury-Redstone BD, was designed as an engineering test to correct these problems before the booster could be considered man-rated.

The space between the pressurized instrument compartment and the capsule was originally intended to hold a parachute recovery system for the rocket, but it had been left empty after this system was abandoned. The three uncrewed Mercury-Redstone flights exhibited high vibration levels and structural bending in the adapter area, so Alan Shepard's flight included 340 pounds of lead-infused plastic in the adapter section along with additional bracing and stiffeners. After Shepard still reported noticeable vibration during launch, Gus Grissom's booster included even more ballast. The Atlas booster used for orbital Mercury flights had also experienced this issue, but with more catastrophic results as Mercury-Atlas 1 was destroyed in-flight due to structural failure caused by excessive flexing at the point where the booster mated with the capsule adapter.

In total, some 800 modifications were made to the Redstone design in the process of adapting it for the Mercury program. The process of man-rating the Redstone was so extensive that NASA quickly found itself using not an off-the-shelf rocket, but what was in effect a completely new one, thus negating all of the hardware and flight test data from previous Redstone and Jupiter-C launches. This created a series of disputes between Von Braun's team at ABMA and NASA, as the former preferred simply making the abort system as foolproof as possible so as to guarantee that the astronaut would be bailed out of a malfunctioning launch vehicle, while the latter favored maximum booster reliability to minimize the chance of aborts happening at all.

== Proposed parachute recovery system ==
The Mercury-Redstone designers originally planned for the rocket to be recovered by parachute after its separation from the Mercury capsule. This was the first significant effort to develop a recoverable launch vehicle and the first to reach the testing phase.

The recovery system, at the top of the rocket, would have used two stages of parachutes. In the first stage, a single parachute, 17 feet (5.2 m) in diameter, would stabilize the rocket's fall and slow its descent. This parachute would then draw out a set of three main parachutes, each 67 feet (20 m) across. The rocket would come down in the Atlantic Ocean, to be recovered by ship.

To determine the feasibility of this system, several tests were performed on full-sized Redstone, including water impact and flotation tests, and an exercise at sea in which a floating Redstone was picked up by a Navy recovery ship. All these tests showed recovery of the rocket to be workable. Further development was halted, however, due to lack of funding, so the parachute system was not tested.

== Flights ==
Mercury-Redstone flights were designated with the prefix "MR-". Confusingly, the Mercury-Redstone boosters used for these flights were designated in the same way, usually with different numbers. This designation can be seen on the rocket's tail end (usually visible in full resolution images, check the table below).

Two rockets, MR-4 and MR-6, were never flown. Although there had been rumors that NASA in the very beginning of Project Mercury had intended to launch each astronaut on a suborbital mission before beginning orbital Atlas flights, NASA purchased only eight Mercury-Redstone boosters, one of which was damaged in the unsuccessful MR-1 launch and not reused, and another for the MR-BD flight. The original schedule was for one uncrewed Mercury-Redstone flight, one chimpanzee flight, and six crewed flights. Since Alan Shepard and Gus Grissom's flights were successful and since the Soviet Union had flown two orbital crewed space flights by the late summer of 1961, there was no need to continue with Redstone missions.

Mercury-Redstone booster and flight designations
Flight designation	Rocket designation	Launch date	Comments
MR-1	MR-1	21 November 1960	Empty capsule; launch abort; rocket shut down at liftoff due to electrical fault
MR-1A	MR-3	19 December 1960	Empty capsule
MR-2	MR-2	31 January 1961	Carried Ham, a chimpanzee
MR-BD	MR-5	24 March 1961	Empty nonfunctional boilerplate capsule
MR-3	MR-7	5 May 1961	Carried astronaut Alan Shepard
MR-4	MR-8	21 July 1961	Carried astronaut Gus Grissom
(unflown)	MR-4		
(unflown)	MR-6		

== Gallery ==
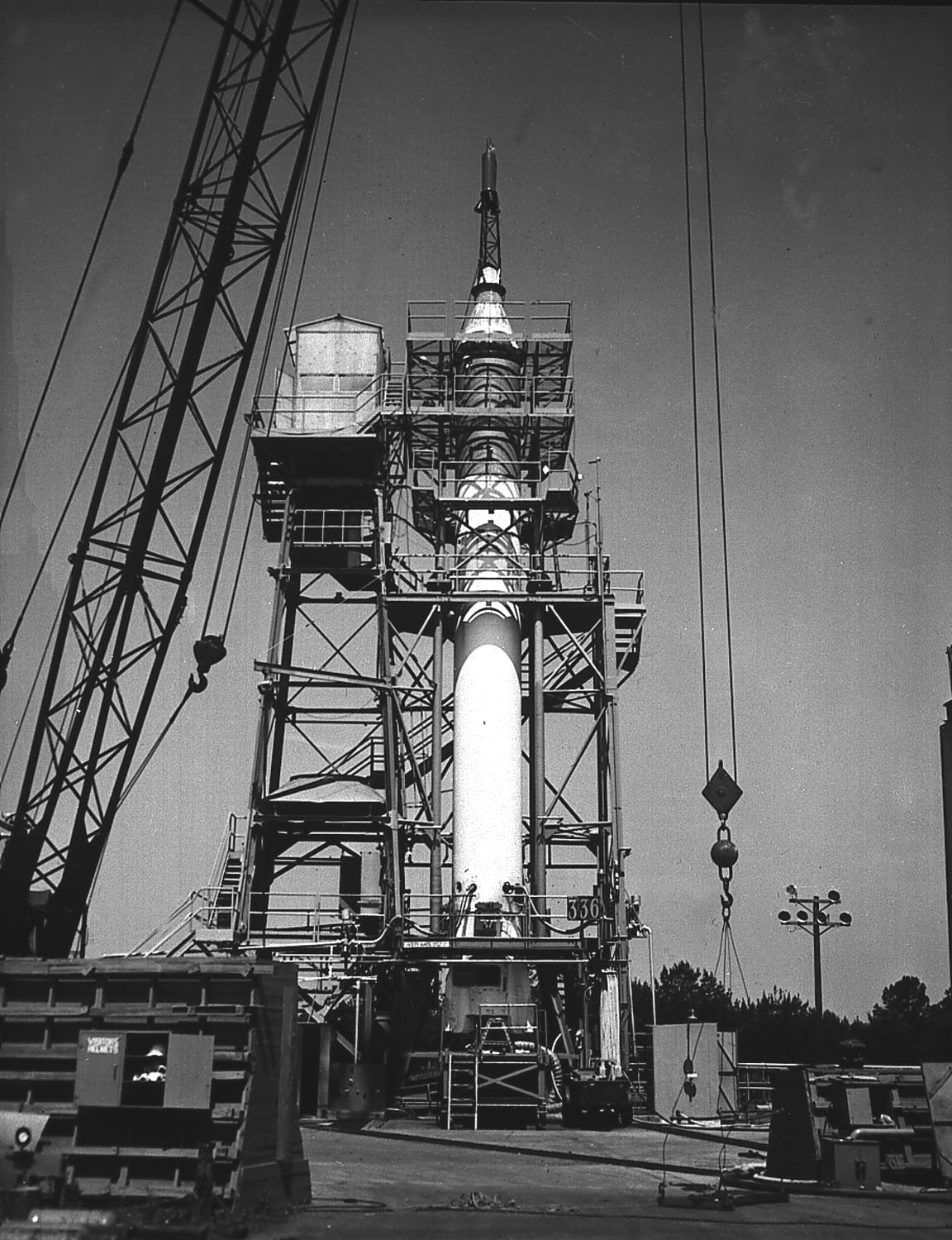
Mercury-Redstone prior to test-firing in the Redstone Test Stand at Marshall Space Flight Center, Alabama

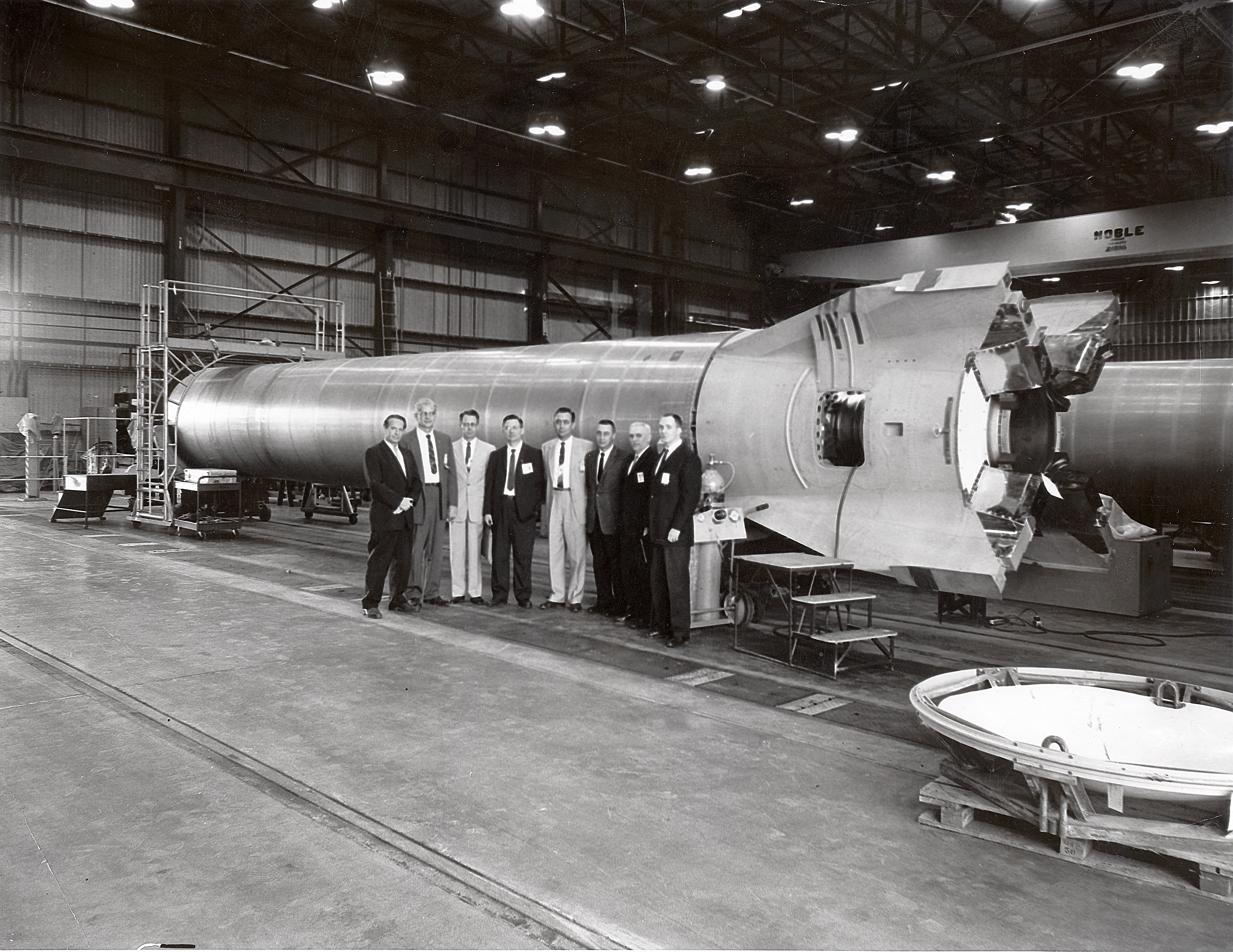
MSFC Mercury-Redstone Project Manager Joachim Kuettner (l) and center officials host MR-4 astronaut Gus Grissom (6th from l).

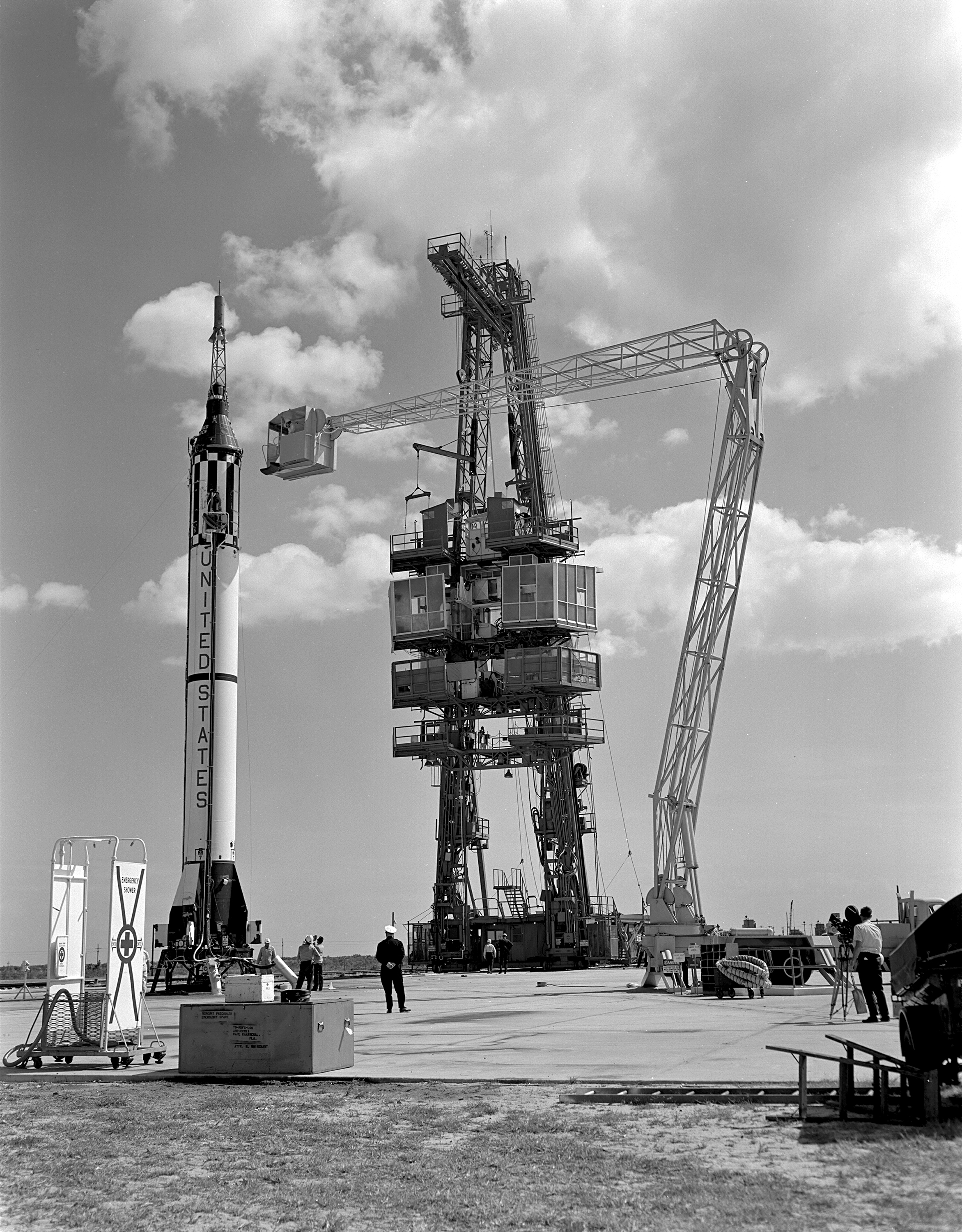
MR-3 prelaunch activities April 21, 1961 at LC-5, Cape Canaveral, Florida

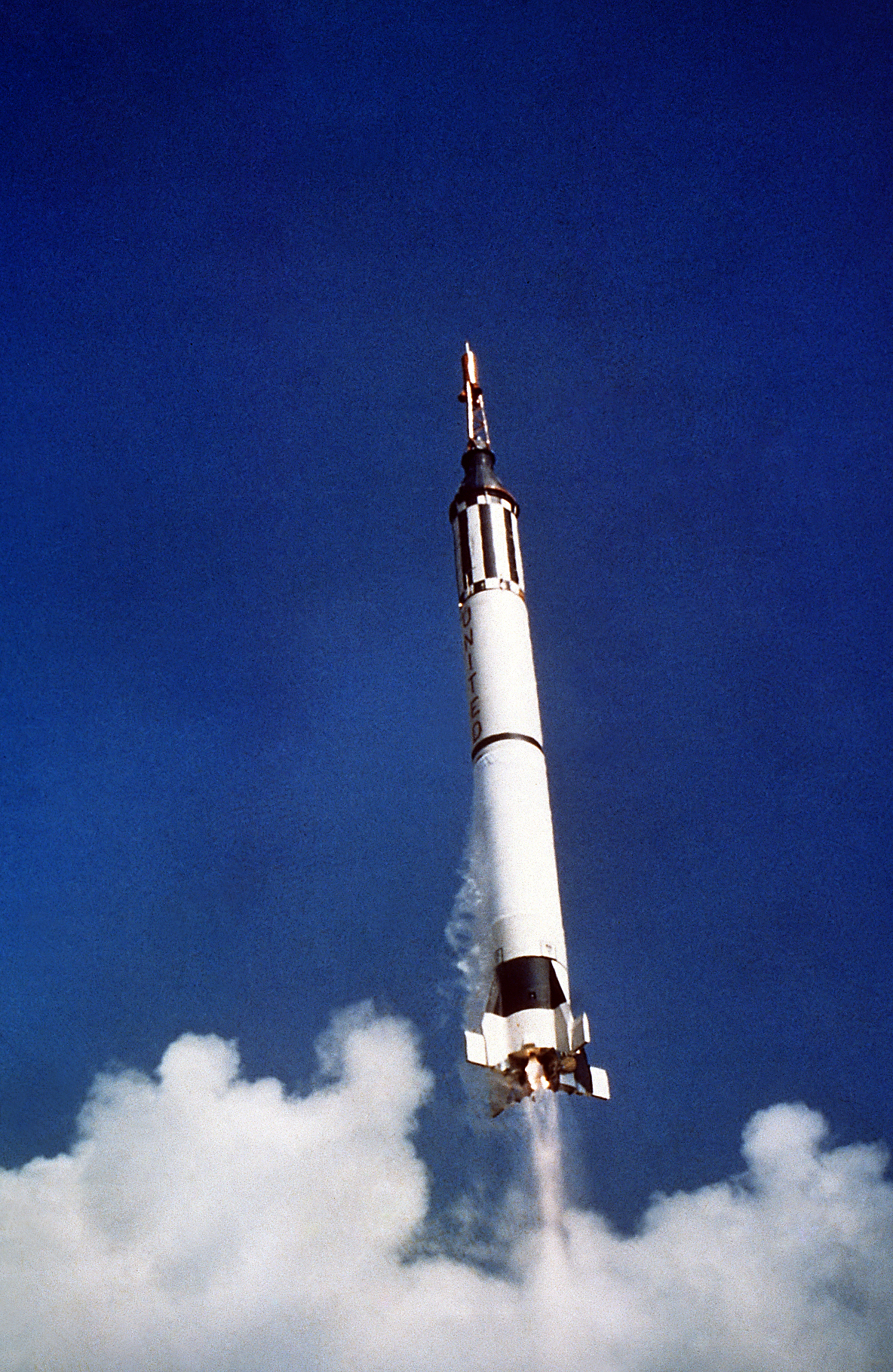
MR-3 launch May 5, 1961 (Shepard)

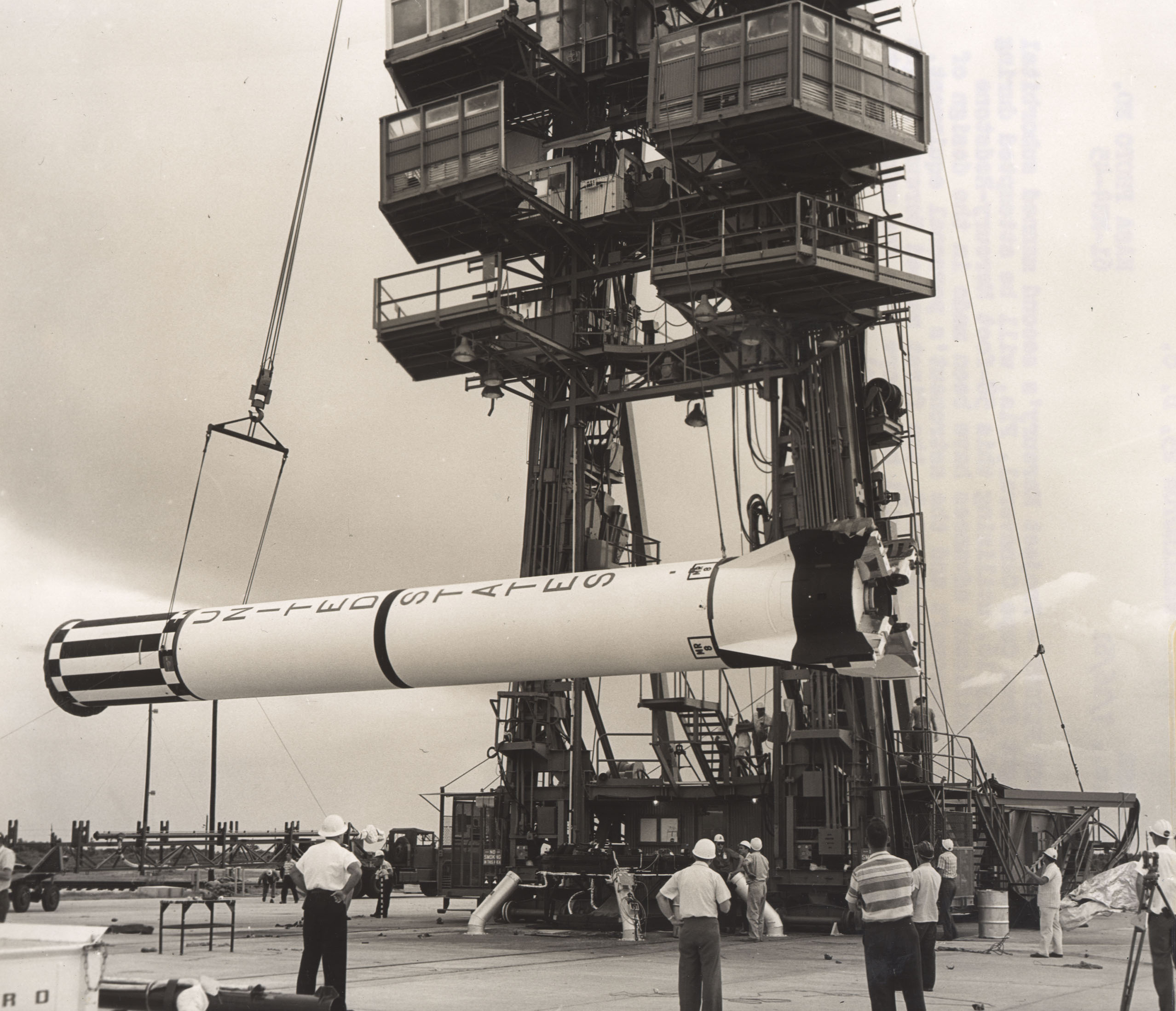
MR-4 booster erection at LC-5

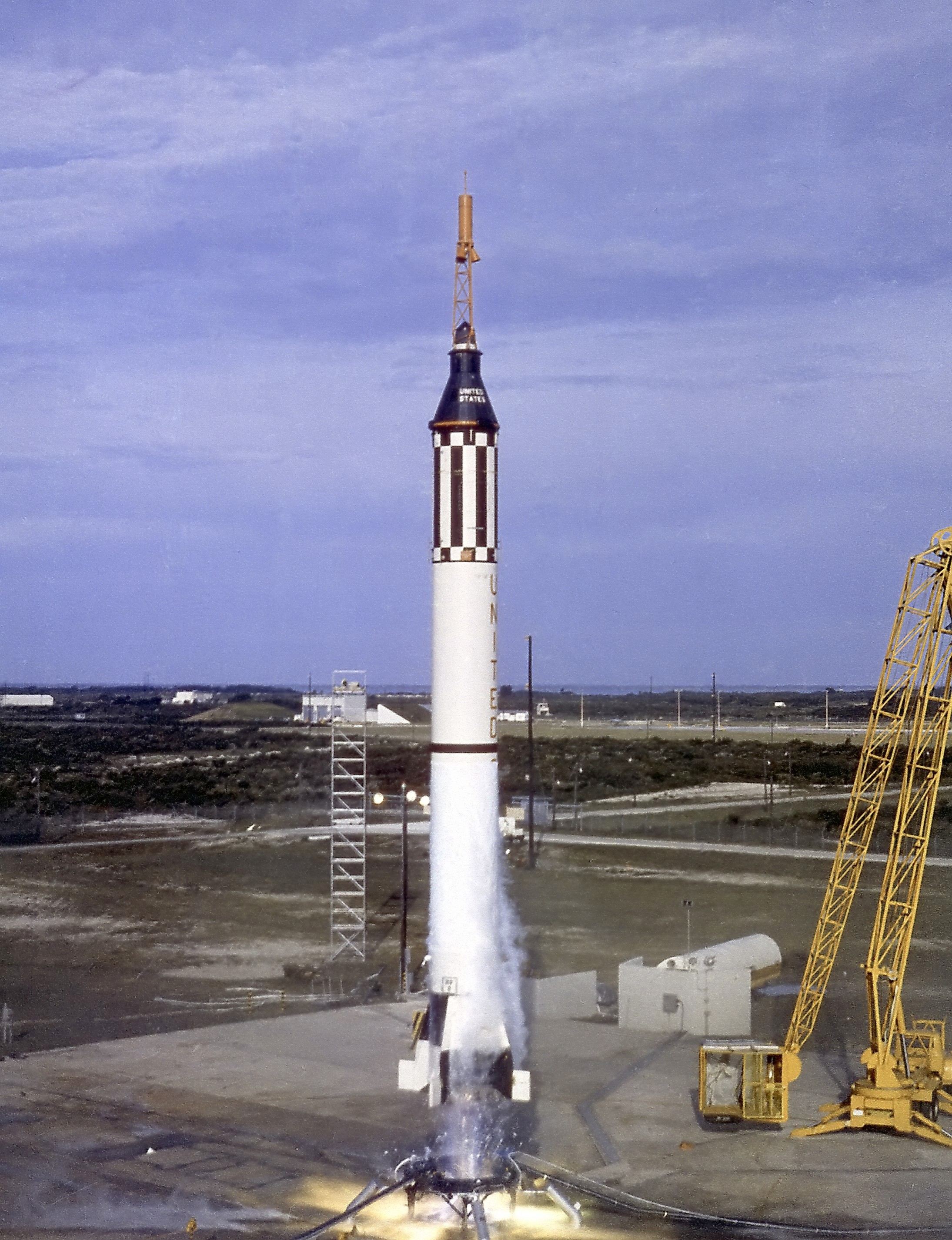
MR-4 launch July 21, 1961 (Grissom)

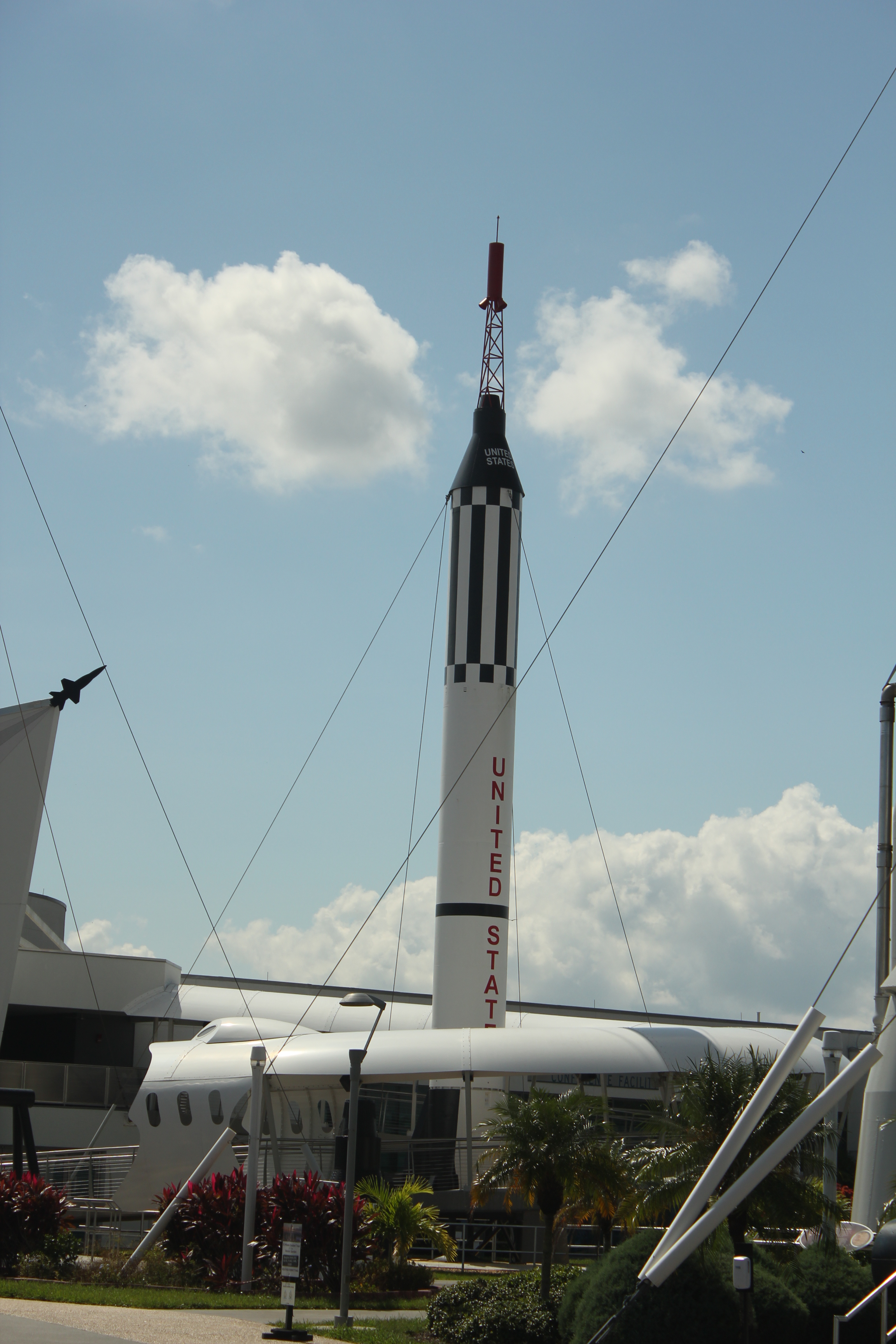
At Merritt Island, Florida, the Kennedy Space Center Visitor Complex has a Mercury-Redstone rocket on display.

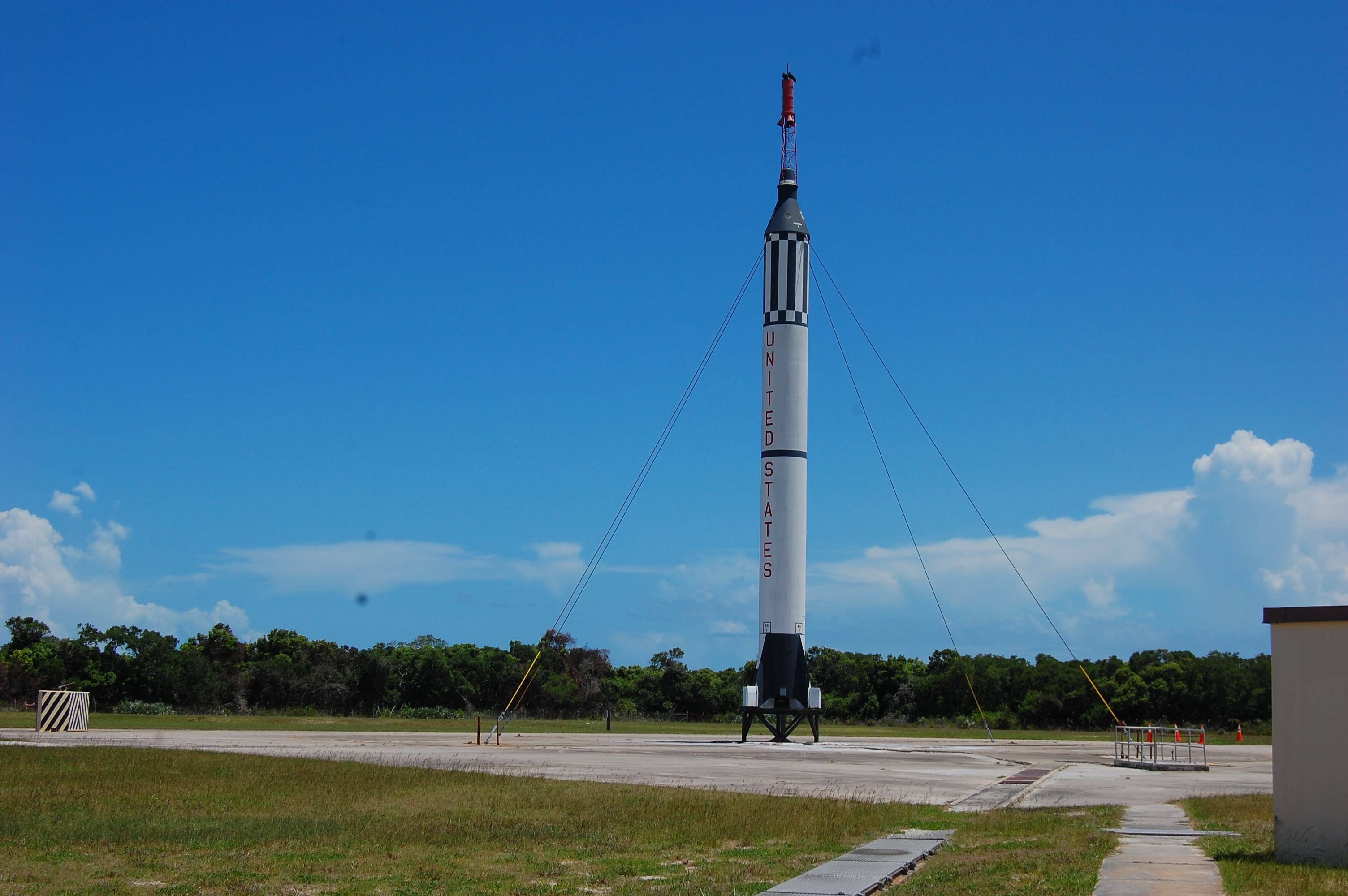
Mercury-Redstone at Cape Canaveral Air Force Station Launch Complex 5 pad.

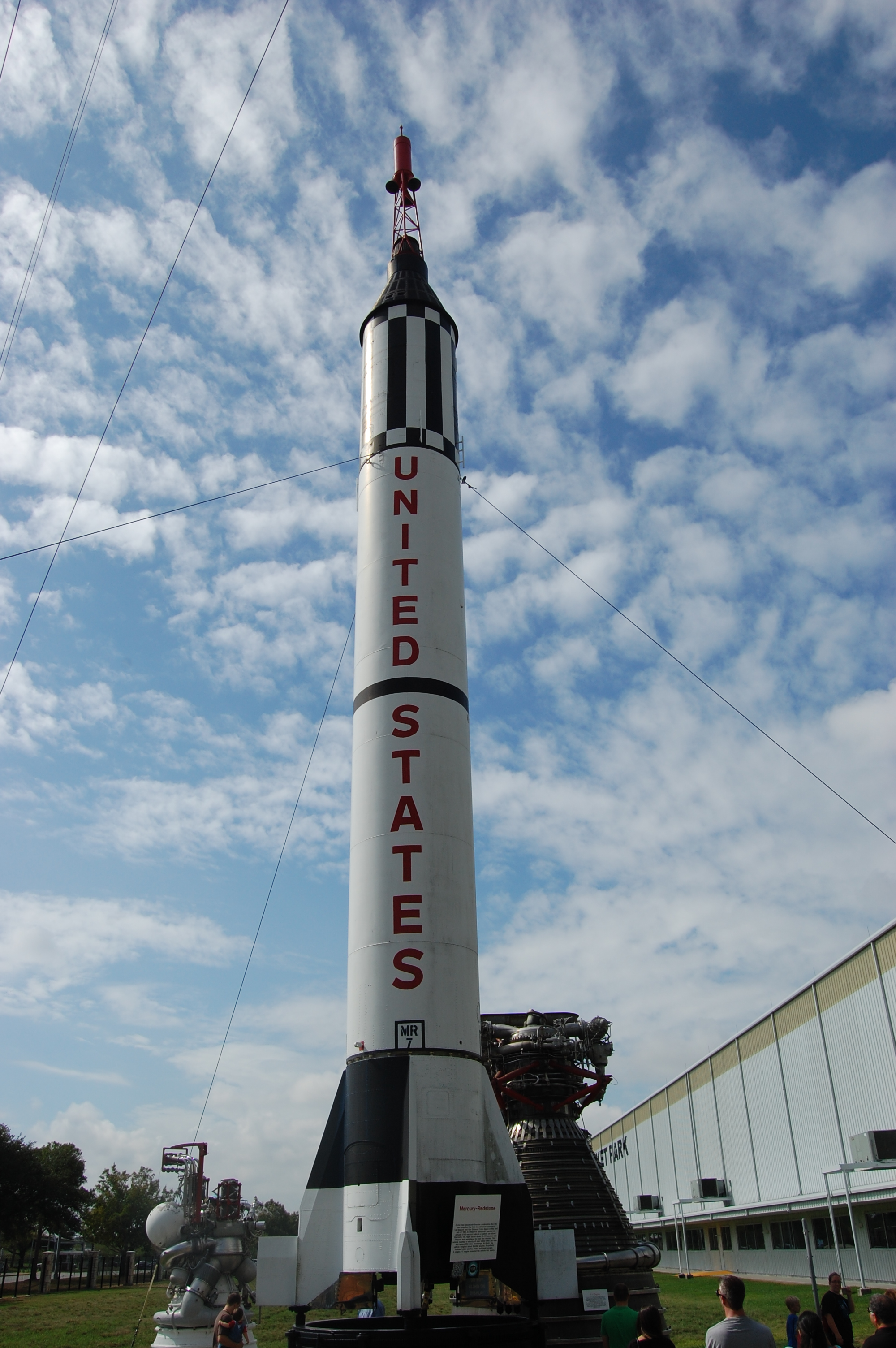
Mercury-Redstone rocket on display at Johnson Space Center, Houston, TX.

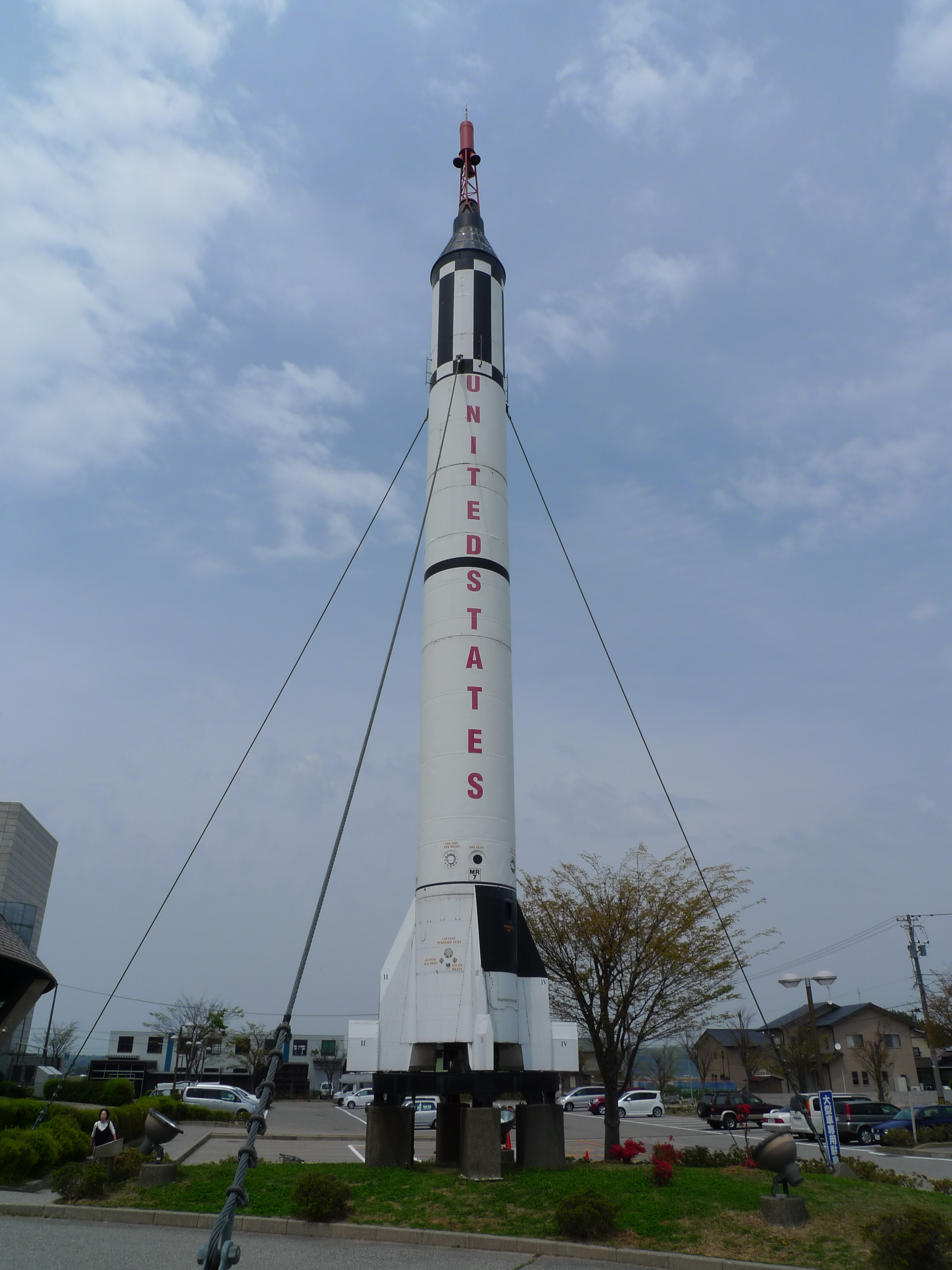
Mercury-Redstone at Cosmo Isle Hakui

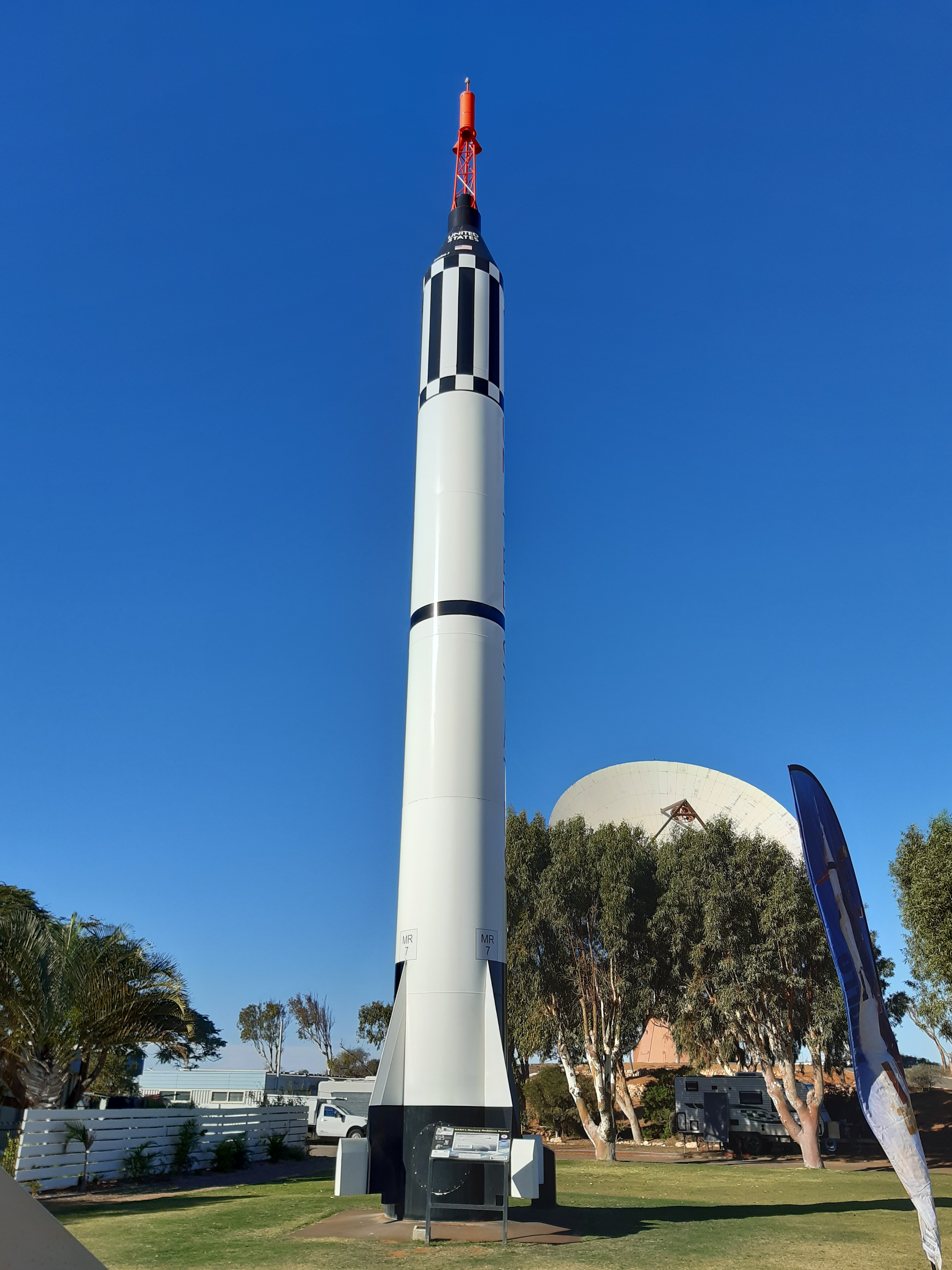
Mercury Redstone at OTC Satellite Earth Station, Carnarvon

== On display ==
Displayed as a Mercury-Redstone Launch Vehicle:

- Kennedy Space Center Visitor Complex, Merritt Island, Florida (one in the rocket garden, one near the badging office, and one at Launch Complex 5)
- Air Zoo, Kalamazoo, Michigan (in storage)
- Kansas Cosmosphere, Hutchinson, Kansas
- Museum of Life + Science, Durham, North Carolina
- Parque de las Ciencias Luis A. Ferré at Bayamón, Puerto Rico
- Space Center Houston, Houston, Texas
- US Space and Rocket Center, Huntsville, Alabama
