= Joachim Kuettner =

German-American scientist (1909–2011)

Joachim Kuettner (September 21, 1909 – February 24, 2011), also spelled Küttner, was a German-American atmospheric scientist.

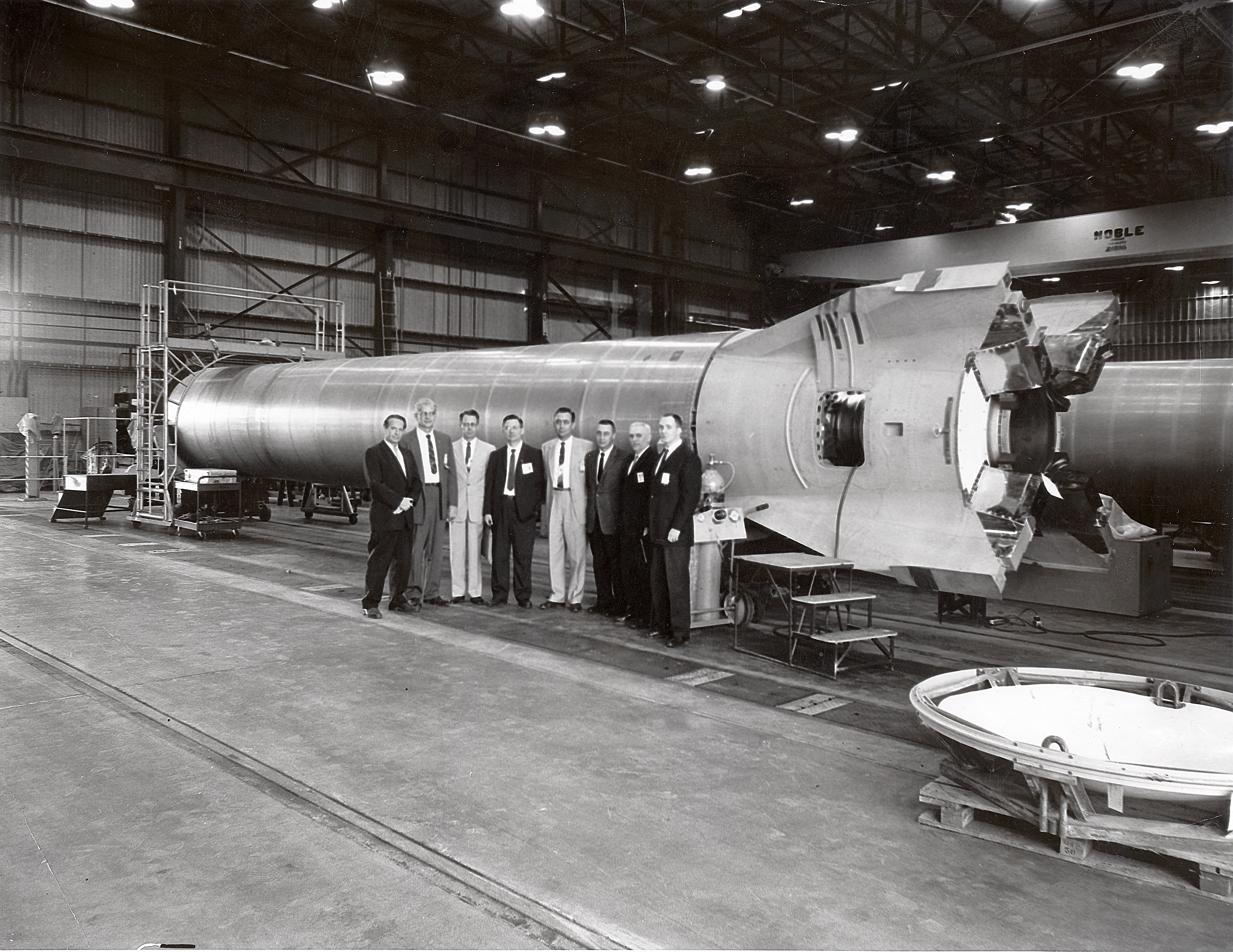
The booster of a Mercury-Redstone Launch Vehicle. MSFC Mercury-Redstone Project Manager Joachim Kuettner (left) and center officials host MR-4 astronaut Gus Grissom (6th from left).

== Germany ==
Born and raised in Breslau, Germany, Joachim Kuettner put his early interest in the atmosphere aside to complete a doctorate in law and economics at age 21. He worked in small-town courts and gazed at cumulus clouds while on the road. As Germany's legal and political structure deteriorated in the 1930s, Kuettner switched gears to earn a second doctorate, this time in meteorology. For his dissertation, he deployed 25 instrumented gliders to gather data on lee waves, the newly discovered features forming downwind of mountains. He also set a world altitude record for gliders, soaring without oxygen—and with numb feet and blue fingers—to 6,800 meters (22,300 feet).

Kuettner became a test pilot and engineer at Dornier, Messerschmitt, and Zeppelin, and flew 45 types of aircraft during this time. Among other things, he led the flight testing of the world's largest airplane, the Gigant, during World War II, narrowly escaping death as the plane broke apart in flight and his parachute opened just 200 meters (660 feet) above ground. After the war, "I wanted to go to a mountaintop and be alone," Kuettner recalled. He spent three years studying many atmospheric phenomena, including thunderstorm electricity, at the observatory atop the Zugspitze, the highest point in Germany.

== Move to U.S. ==
In the early 1950s, Kuettner came to the United States and joined the Sierra Wave Project as scientific field director, investigating lee waves in California. Then, as the U.S. space program got under way, Kuettner became director of the Mercury Redstone project— at NASA's Marshall Space Flight Center which culminated in 1961 by putting the first American, Alan Shepard, into space. Kuettner also headed systems integration during the early stages of the Apollo project.

== GATE ==
Kuettner coordinated and planned many international atmospheric field studies, including the landmark Global Atmospheric Research Program's Atlantic Tropical Experiment (GATE)—with more than 70 nations participating—in 1974; the Monsoon Experiment (MONEX) in 1979; and the Central Equatorial Pacific Experiment (CEPEX) in 1993.

== NCAR ==
In the 1980s Kuettner was based at the National Center for Atmospheric Research. He joined the staff of NCAR's managing organization, the University Corporation for Atmospheric Research in 1994 when the National Science Foundation awarded him the UCAR Distinguished Chair for Atmospheric Science and International Research. Shortly before his death in 2011, the Federal Republic of Germany presented Kuettner with the Officer's Cross of the Order of Merit, one of Germany's highest civilian honors.

Kuettner attributed his sustained love of atmospheric research to two traits: "curiosity and joy of adventure. If you can preserve these two wonderful afflictions through your life, you will never be able to stop exploring the atmosphere."
