= Mercury-Redstone 2 =

1961 American space flight

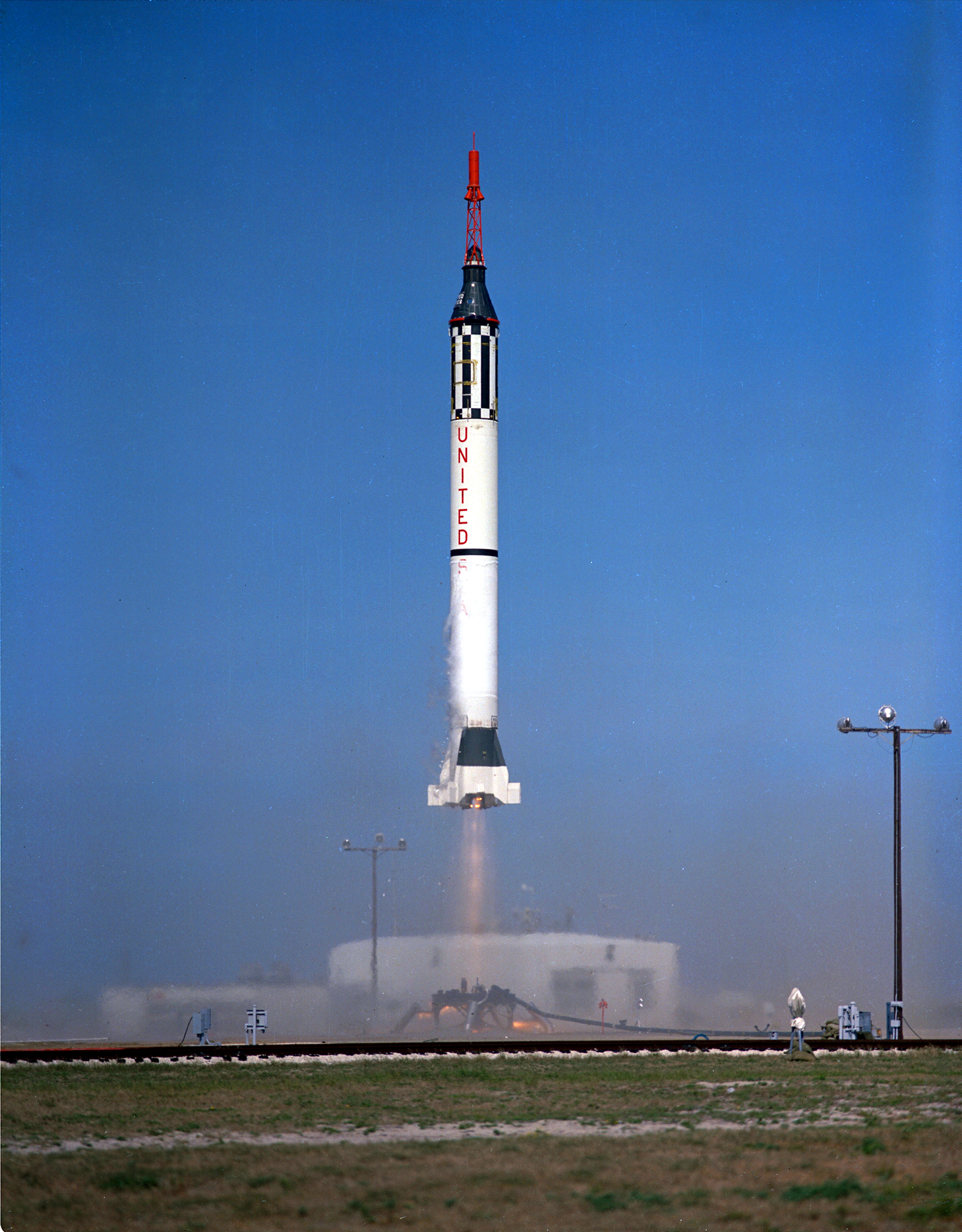
- Launch of Mercury-Redstone 2
- Mission type: Test flight
- Operator: NASA
- Mission duration: 16 minutes, 39 seconds
- Distance travelled: 679 kilometers (422 mi)
- Apogee: 253 kilometers (157 mi)

Spacecraft properties
- Spacecraft: Mercury No.5
- Manufacturer: McDonnell Aircraft
- Launch mass: 1,203 kilograms (2,652 lb)

Crew
- Crew size: 1 chimpanzee
- Members: Ham
- Callsign: Mercury-Redstone 2

Start of mission
- Launch date: January 31, 1961, 16:55 UTC
- Rocket: Redstone MRLV MR-2
- Launch site: Cape Canaveral LC-5

End of mission
- Recovered by: USS Donner
- Landing date: January 31, 1961, 17:12 UTC
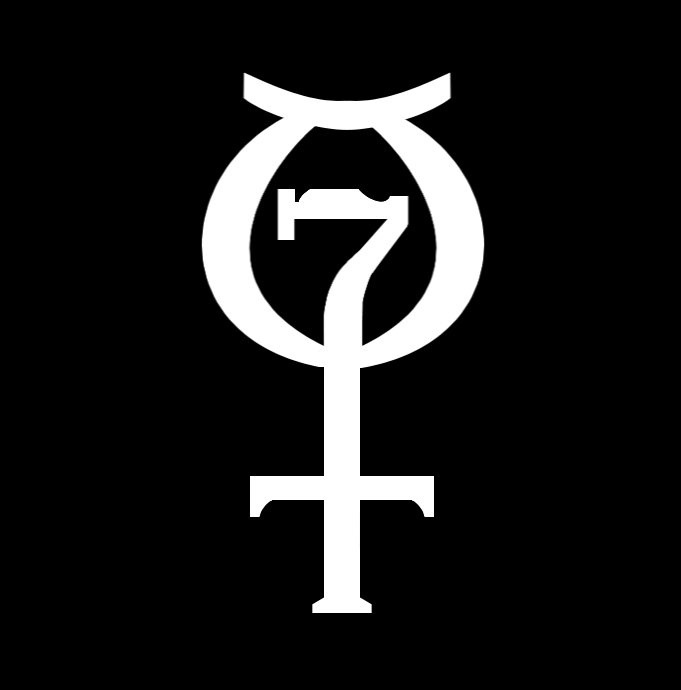
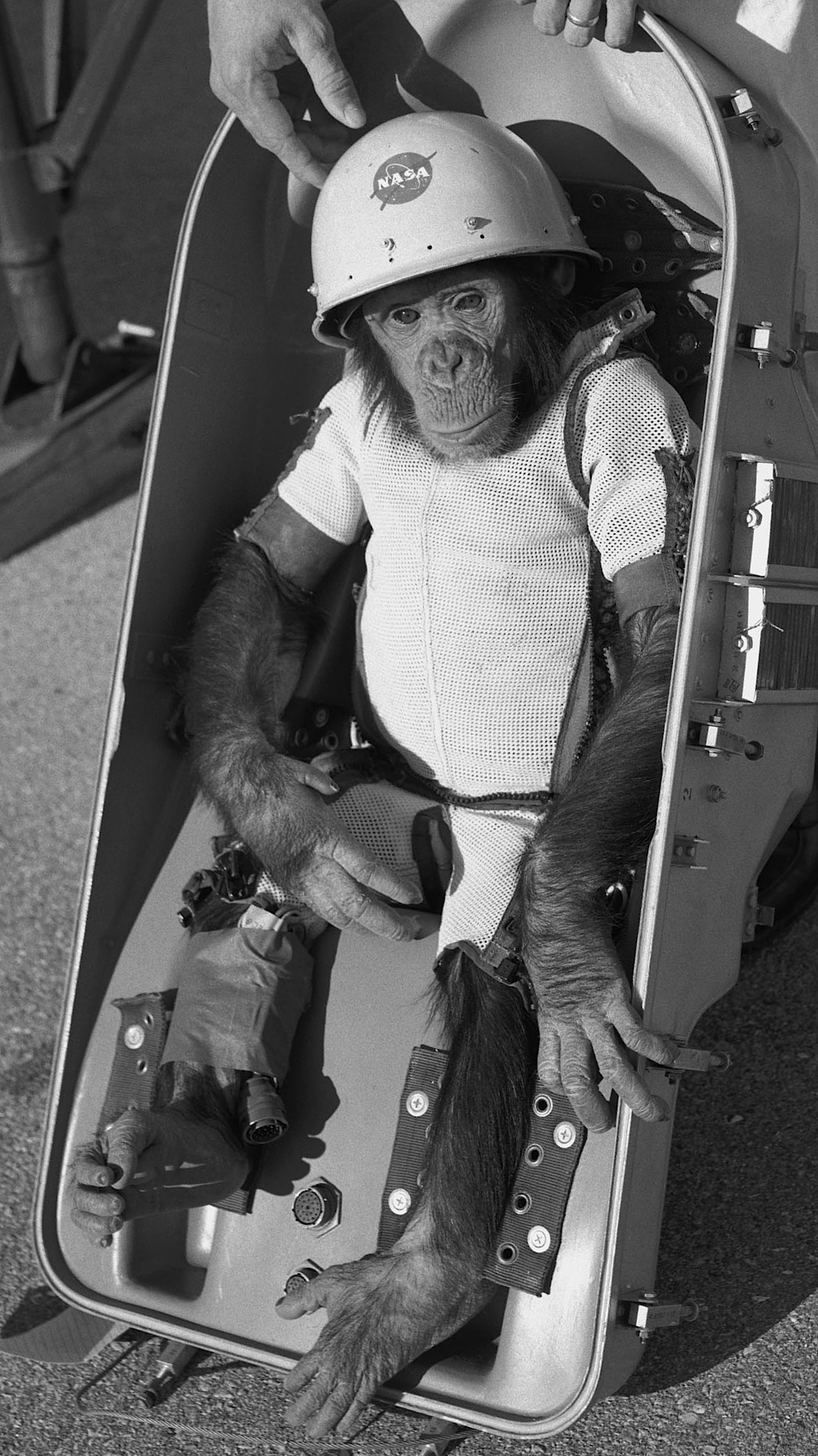
- Ham Project Mercury; Mercury-Redstone series

Mercury-Redstone 2 (MR-2) was the test flight of the Mercury-Redstone Launch Vehicle just prior to the first crewed American space mission in Project Mercury. Carrying a chimpanzee named Ham on a suborbital flight, Mercury spacecraft Number 5 was launched at 16:55 UTC on January 31, 1961, from LC-5 at Cape Canaveral, Florida. The capsule and Ham, the first great ape in space, landed safely in the Atlantic Ocean 16 minutes and 39 seconds after launch.

== Background ==
The previous Mercury-Redstone mission, MR-1A, flew a trajectory that was too steep with accelerations too high for a human passenger. MR-1A had climbed to its programmed apogee of about 130 miles (210 km) and landed 235 miles (378 km) downrange. Mercury-Redstone 2 would follow a more flattened trajectory. Its planned flight path was an apogee of 115 miles (185 km) and a range of 290 miles (470 km).

== Mission ==
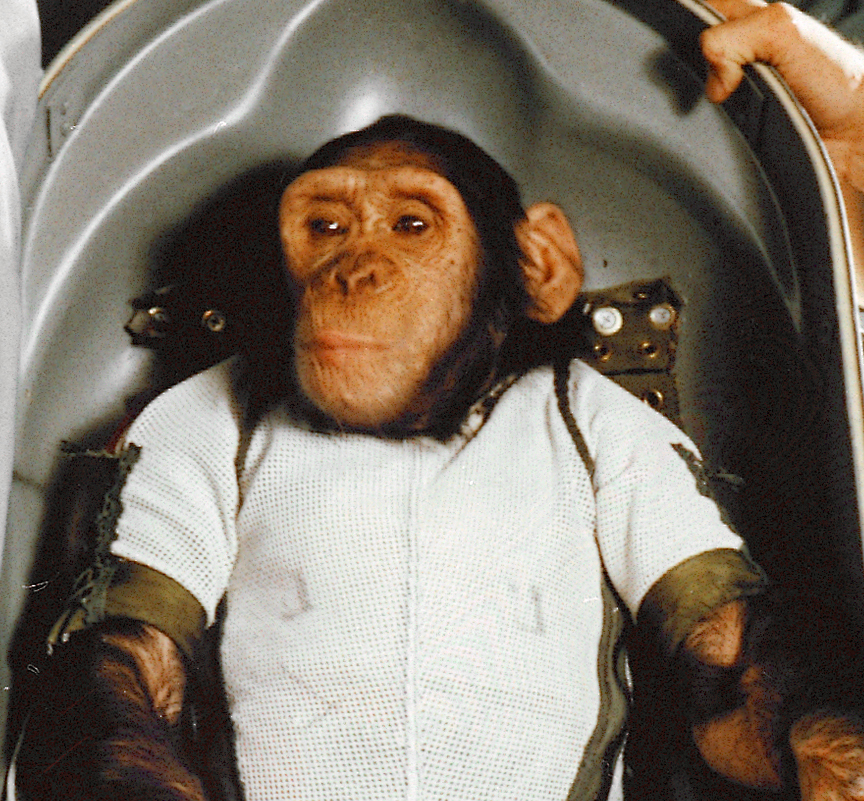
Ham before the launch of Mercury-Redstone 2

Mercury spacecraft Number 5 contained six new systems that had not been on previous flights: environmental control system, attitude stabilization control system, live retrorockets, voice communications system, "closed loop" abort sensing system, and a pneumatic landing bag.

Six chimpanzees (four female and two male) and 20 medical specialists and animal handlers from Holloman Air Force Base, New Mexico, where the chimpanzees lived and were trained, were moved into quarters behind Hangar S at Cape Canaveral, Florida, on January 2, 1961. The six chimpanzees were trained in Mercury simulators for three weeks. The day before the flight, two chimpanzees were chosen for the mission: one primary, Ham, and one backup, a female chimpanzee named Minnie. The competition was fierce, but Ham was full of energy and good humor. Ham was named in honor of Holloman Aerospace Medical Center. Ham was from Cameroon, Africa, (original name Chang, Chimp No. 65) and was purchased by the USAF July 9, 1959. He was 3 years 8 months old at launch.

At 12:53 UTC, January 31, 1961, Ham was inserted into the spacecraft. The countdown was then delayed almost four hours because of a hot inverter, and several other minor problems.

At 16:55 UTC the MR-2 lifted off. One minute after the launch, computers reported that the flight path angle was at least one degree too high and rising. At two minutes, the computers predicted a 17 g (167 m/s^{2}) acceleration. At 2 minutes 17 seconds into the flight, the Redstone's liquid oxygen (LOX) fuel was depleted. The closed-loop abort system sensed a change in engine chamber pressure when the LOX supply was depleted and fired the launch escape system. The abort signaled a Mayday message to the recovery forces.

The high flight angle, and the early abort, caused the maximum velocity of the spacecraft, relative to the Earth's surface, to be 7,540 ft/s (2,300 m/s) instead of the planned 6,465 ft/s (1,971 m/s). The retrorockets had been jettisoned during the abort and therefore could not be used to slow down the spacecraft. All of this added up to an overshoot of the planned landing area by 130 miles (210 km) and an apogee of 157 miles (253 km) instead of 115 miles (185 km).

Another problem occurred at 2 minutes and 18 seconds into the flight, when cabin pressure dropped from 5.5 to 1 lb/in^{2} (38 to 7 kPa). This malfunction was traced later to the air inlet snorkel valve. Vibrations had loosened a pin in the snorkel valve and allowed the valve to open. Ham was safe in his own couch spacesuit and did not suffer any ill effects from the loss of cabin pressure. His couch spacesuit pressure remained normal, and suit temperature stayed well within the 60 to 80 degrees Fahrenheit (16 to 26 °C) optimum range.

Because of over-acceleration of the launch vehicle and the boost from the escape rocket, a speed relative to the Earth's surface of 5,140 mph (8,270 km/h) was reached instead of the 4,400 mph (7,100 km/h) planned. At apogee Ham's spacecraft was 48 miles (77 km) farther downrange than planned. Ham was weightless for 6.6 minutes instead of the 4.9 minutes that were planned. The spacecraft landed 422 miles (679 km) downrange after a 16.5-minute flight. He received 14.7 g (144 m/s²) during reentry, almost 3 g (29 m/s²) greater than planned.

Ham performed his tasks well, pushing levers about 50 times during the flight. Onboard cameras filming Ham's reaction to weightlessness showed a surprising amount of dust and debris floating around inside the capsule during apogee.

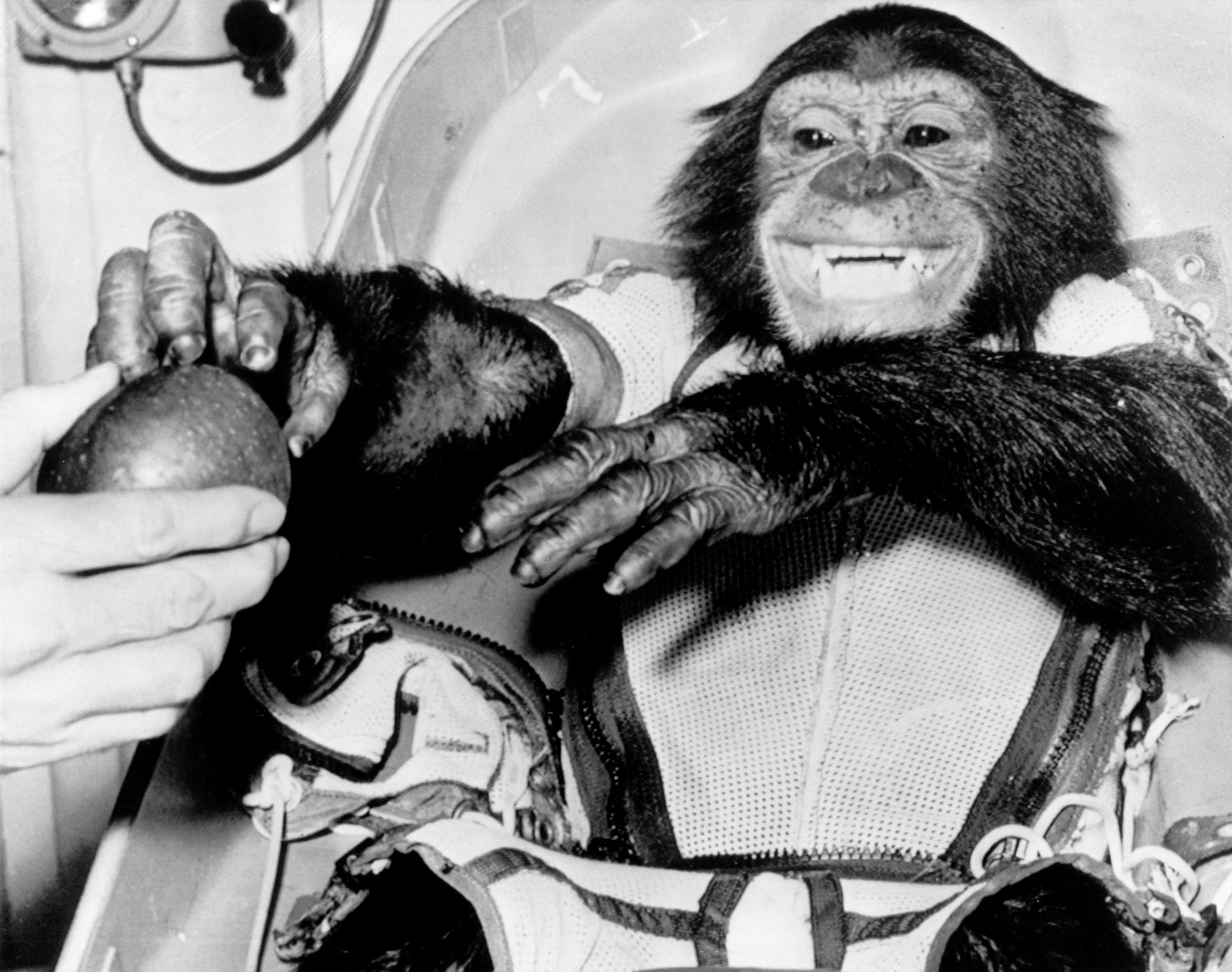
Ham accepts an apple.

The spacecraft splashed down about 12:12 pm. EST, out of sight from recovery forces. About 12 minutes later, the first recovery signal was received from the spacecraft. Tracking showed it was about 60 miles (97 km) from the nearest recovery ship. Twenty-seven minutes after landing, a search plane sighted the capsule floating upright in the Atlantic. The search plane requested that the Navy send its rescue helicopters from the closest ship carrying them.

When helicopters arrived they found the spacecraft on its side, taking on water, and submerging. Upon water impact, the beryllium heat shield had bounced against the capsule bottom, punching two holes in the titanium pressure bulkhead. The landing bag had worn badly, and the heatshield was torn free from the spacecraft before recovery. After the craft capsized, the open snorkel valve let still more sea water enter the capsule. When the helicopter crew finally latched onto and picked up Ham's spacecraft at 18:52 UTC, they estimated there was about 800 pounds (360 kg) of sea water aboard. The spacecraft was flown to and lowered to the deck of USS Donner. When the spacecraft was opened Ham appeared to be in good condition and readily accepted an apple and half an orange.

== Post-flight ==
With the malfunctions during the flight, the Mercury-Redstone was deemed not ready for a human passenger planned for MR-3. It was postponed pending a final booster development flight, Mercury-Redstone BD.

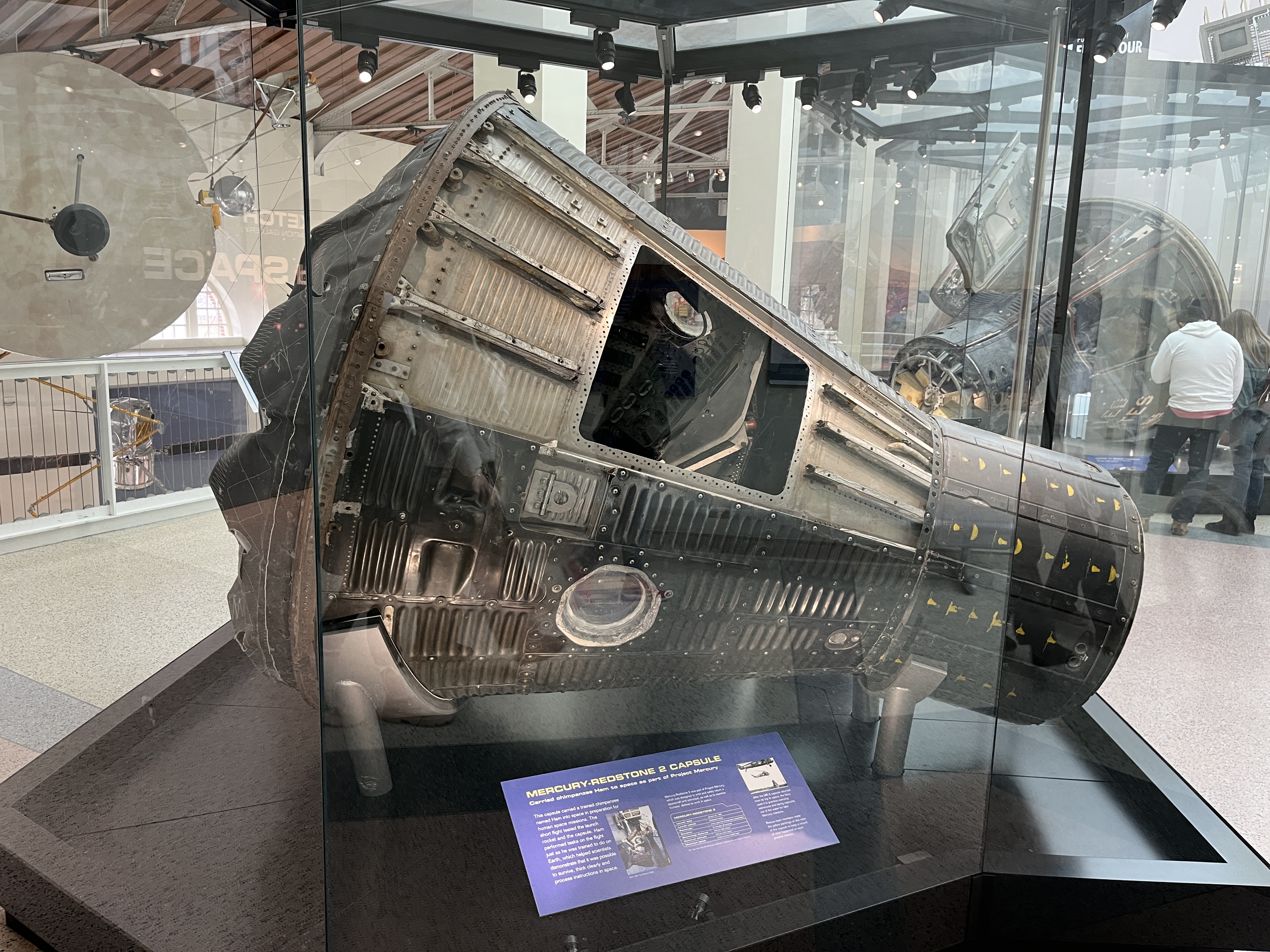
The Mercury-Redstone 2 capsule on display at the California Science Center

After his spaceflight, Ham was transferred to the National Zoo in Washington, D.C., for 17 years and then in 1981 was moved to a zoo in North Carolina to live with a colony of other chimpanzees. He died on January 19, 1983, at the age of 26. Ham is buried at the New Mexico Museum of Space History in Alamogordo, New Mexico. He was one of many animals in space.

Ham's backup, Minnie, was the only female chimpanzee trained for the Mercury program. After her role in the Mercury program ended, Minnie became part of an Air Force chimp-breeding program, producing nine offspring and helping raise the offspring of several other members of the chimpanzee colony. She was the last surviving astro-chimp. She died at the age of 41 on March 14, 1998.

Mercury spacecraft No. 5, used in the Mercury-Redstone 2 mission, is currently displayed at the California Science Center, Los Angeles, California.

== Mercury Redstone 2 sub-orbital flight events ==
| T+ Time | Event | Description |
|---|---|---|
| T+00:00:00 | Liftoff | Mercury-Redstone lifts off, onboard clock starts. |
| T+00:00:16 | Pitch Program | Redstone pitches over 2 deg/s from 90 deg to 45 deg. |
| T+00:00:40 | End Pitch Program | Redstone reaches 45 deg pitch. |
| T+00:01:00 | Anomaly | Computers report pitch angle is 46 deg and rising. |
| T+00:01:24 | Max Q | Maximum dynamic pressure ~575 lbf/ft² (27.5 kPa). |
| T+00:02:17 | BECO | Redstone engine shutdown – Booster Engine Cutoff 3 seconds early. |
| T+00:02:17 | Abort, Capsule Separation | Launch escape system fired, mayday message signal sent to the recovery forces. |
| T+00:02:18 | Malfunction | Snorkel valve opened, cabin pressure dropped from 5.5 to 1 psi (38 to 7 kPa). |
| T+00:02:19 | Retro Pack Jettison | Retro pack is jettisoned, leaving heatshield clear. |
| T+00:02:20 | Tower Jettison | Escape Tower Jettison. |
| T+00:02:35 | Turnaround Maneuver | Capsule ASCS system rotates capsule 180 degrees, to heat shield forward attitude. Nose is pitched down 34 degrees. |
| T+00:05:00 | Apogee | Apogee of about 157 miles (253 km) reached at 198 miles (319 km) downrange from launch site. |
| T+00:05:45 | Retract Periscope | Periscope is automatically retracted in preparation for reentry. |
| T+00:06:20 | Retro Attitude Maneuver | ASCS orients capsule in 34 degrees nose down pitch, 0 degrees roll, 0 degrees yaw. |
| T+00:08:24 | .05 G Maneuver | ASCS detects beginning of reentry and rolls capsule at 10 degrees per second to stabilize capsule during reentry. |
| T+00:10:47 | Drogue Parachute Deploy | Drogue parachute deployed at 22,000 ft (6.7 km) slowing descent to 365 ft/s (111 m/s) and stabilizing capsule. |
| T+00:10:54 | Snorkel Deploy | Fresh air snorkel deploys at 20,000 ft (6.1 km). ECS switches to emergency oxygen rate to cool cabin. |
| T+00:11:24 | Main Parachute Deploy | Main parachute deploys at 10,000 ft (3.0 km). Descent rate slows to 30 ft/s (9.1 m/s) |
| T+00:11:29 | Landing Bag Deploy | Landing bag deploys, dropping heat shield down 4 ft (1.2 m). |
| T+00:11:29 | Fuel Dump | Remaining hydrogen peroxide fuel automatically dumped. |
| T+00:16:39 | Splashdown | Capsule lands in water about 422 mi (679 km) downrange from launch site. |
| T+00:16:39 | Rescue Aids Deploy | Rescue aid package deployed. The package includes green dye marker, recovery radio beacon and whip antenna. |

== See also ==
- Monkeys and apes in space
- Animals in space
- Splashdown (spacecraft landing)
- Aerocapture
