= Brian Kuttner =

English mathematician

Brian Kuttner (11 April 1908 London, England – 2 January 1992 Birmingham, England) was an English mathematician who worked on Fourier Series.
