= Asp =

Asp may refer to:

== Places ==
- Asp, part of Densbüren, Aargau, Switzerland
- Aspe (Asp in Valencian), Alicante, Spain
- Asp Lake, a lake in Minnesota

== Animals ==
- Asp (fish)
- Asp (snake), in antiquity, one of several venomous snakes
  - Cerastes cerastes, a viper found in the Sahara desert
  - Cerastes vipera, a viper found in the Sahara desert
  - Egyptian cobra, a venomous snake found in North Africa and parts of the Middle East
  - Vipera aspis, a viper found in Europe
- Megalopyge opercularis, asp caterpillar or tree asp, a venomous caterpillar

== People ==
- Nathan Aspinall, nicknamed "The Asp", English darts player
- Ninnie Asp (born 1950), Swedish silversmith
- Yndiara Asp (born 1997), Brazilian skateboarder

== Other uses ==
- Aspartic acid, an amino acid, with symbol "Asp"
- Arsenic monophosphide, empirical formula "AsP"
- Aspasia (plant), an orchid genus, abbreviated "Asp."
- An archaic name for the aspen tree
- Asp (character), snake-themed supervillain
- Asp (rocket), a sounding rocket
- Assistant superintendent, police rank, abbreviated "ASP."

== See also ==
- Aspe (disambiguation)
- ASPS (disambiguation)
- ASP (disambiguation)
