= Aspe (surname) =

Aspe is a surname. Notable people with the surname include:

- Alberto García Aspe (born 1967), Mexican footballer
- Elisabeth Aspe (1860–1927), Estonian writer
- Mauricio Aspe (born 1973), Mexican actor
- Pedro Aspe (born 1950), Mexican economist
- Pieter Aspe (1953–2021), Belgian/Flemish novelist
- Renée Aspe (1922–1969), French painter
