= ASP =

ASP may refer to:

== Arts and entertainment ==
- ASP (band), a German gothic metal band
- ASP (Japanese group), Japanese idol girl group
- Apparent Sensory Perception, a thought recording and reproduction device in William Gibson's fiction
- A.S.P. Air Strike Patrol, a 1994 video game
- Assault system pod, for the G.I. Joe doll
- Albany Student Press, newspaper of the University at Albany, The State University of New York, US

== Military and weapons ==
- ASP pistol
- ASP, Inc., law enforcement weapon manufacturer
  - ASP, a type of expandable baton
- Ammunition Supply Point, military storage facility for live ammunition and explosives
- Airborne Surveillance Platform, Indian defence project

== Science and technology ==
=== Computing ===
- Active Server Pages, a web-scripting interface by Microsoft
- ASP.NET, a web-application framework by Microsoft
- Advanced Simple Profile, an MPEG-4 video codec profile
- Answer set programming, a declarative programming paradigm
- Application service provider, to customers over a network
- AppleTalk Session Protocol
- Association of Software Professionals
- Attached Support Processor, IBM hardware system
- Auxiliary storage pool, a feature of the IBM operating system

=== Electronics ===
- Audio Signal Processor, large-scale digital signal processor
- Electronic skip protection or anti-skip protection, in CD playback
- Angle-sensitive pixel, a light sensor

=== Medicine and biology ===
- Aspartic acid, α-amino acid used in the biosynthesis of proteins
- Acylation stimulating protein
- Amnesic shellfish poisoning
- Complement component 3, a protein in the complement system
- Antimicrobial stewardship, effort to educate and persuade prescribers of antimicrobials to follow evidence-based prescribing

== Politics ==
- Act of the Scottish Parliament
- American Solidarity Party, a Christian Democratic political party in the United States
- Australian Sex Party
- Afro-Shirazi Party, political party in Tanzania
- Assembly for the Sovereignty of the Peoples, a political party in Bolivia
- Assembly of States Parties, the legislative body of the International Criminal Court

== Organizations ==
- American Society for Photobiology
- American Society of Primatologists
- Appalachia Service Project, for housing improvement
- Arkansas State Police, US
- Asociación de Scouts del Perú (Scout Association of Peru)
- Association of Surfing Professionals, former name of World Surf League
- Astronomical Society of the Pacific, an American scientific and educational organization
- Avenal State Prison, in California, US
- Autism Society Philippines, an autism organization
- Auto Sport Promotion, a French auto racing team

=== Education ===
- American School of Paris, France
- Jan Matejko Academy of Fine Arts, Kraków, Poland

== Places ==
- Allegany State Park, Pennsylvania, US
- Alice Springs Airport (IATA airport code)
- Aspatria railway station (National Rail code), UK
- Aspendale railway station, Melbourne, Australia

== Other uses ==
- Adult service provider or sex worker
- Additional Superintendent of Police, a police rank in India
- Assistant superintendent of police
- Authorized service provider
- Average selling price, of goods

== See also ==
- ASPS (disambiguation)
- Asp (disambiguation)
