= Aspe (disambiguation) =

Aspe is a town and municipality in Alicante, Spain.

Aspe may also refer to:

- Aspe (surname)
- ASPE (Basque pelota), a sports management company
- Aspe peak, a mountain in the Pyrenees
- Gave d'Aspe, a torrential river in the Pyrenees
- Aspe Valley, named after the river

Abbreviations

- American Society for Precision Engineering
- American Society of Plumbing Engineers
- Accounting Standard for Private Enterprises, a component of the Generally Accepted Accounting Principles of Canada
- American Society of Professional Estimators, an association of professional building estimators
- Assistant Secretary for Planning and Evaluation, an agency of the United States Department of Health and Human Services
- Associazione Italiana per gli Studi di Politica Estera (Italian Association for Foreign Policy Studies), an organization that publishes the journal Affari Esteri

== See also ==
- Asp (disambiguation)
