= Asp (rocket) =

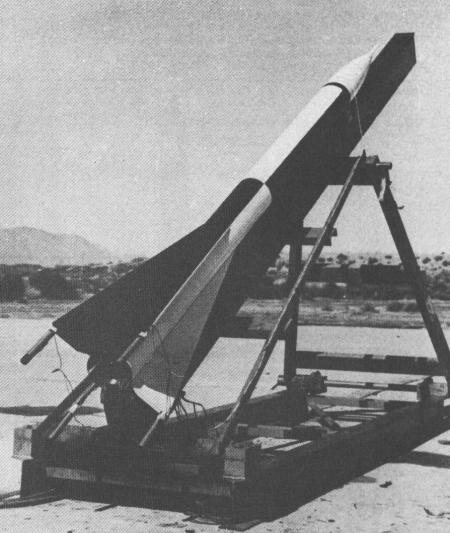
Asp

ASP (Atmospheric Sounding Projectile) is the designation of an American sounding rocket family. ASP was used for a variety of uses, including research into hypersonic speed and to propel rocket sleds. In NASA service it was flown from a number of locations as a sounding rocket. The selection by NASA of the Apache and Javelin rockets for the jobs performed by ASP led to its retirement.

== Versions ==
=== ASP-I ===
ASP-I was used to sample nuclear explosions and resultant clouds The ASP was the fastest single stage sounding rocket when developed. The Asp was manufactured by Cooper Development Corporation, California. The solid propellant motor was made by Grand Central Rocket company.

The ASP-I has a payload ability of 11 kg, a maximum flight height of 110 km, a takeoff thrust of 42.00 kN, a mass of 111 kg, a diameter of 0.17 m, a length of 3.68 m and a fin span of 0.51 m.

ASP-I was launched 30 times from December 1, 1955 to June 14, 1962 from White Sands, Cape Canaveral, Point Mugu, Bikini, China Lake, Mercury site and Tonopah.

=== ASP-II ===
ASP-II (Cleansweep I) had a slightly lower total impulse and a significantly shorter burn time (3.6 seconds vs. 5.6). Cleansweep I was used to collect particulate air sample from nuclear explosions at the Nevada Test Range. It was launched once in 1959 from Tonopah with an apogee of 30 km.

=== ASP-III ===
ASP-III (Cleansweep II) had slightly lower specs. It was also modified for use in the South Pacific. Two or four LOKI rockets were strapped on the basic ASP. Results were less than expected and ASP-III was a failure. It was launched four times from White Sands between 1957 and 1958.

=== ASP-IV ===
ASP-IV used an ASP motor case with B.F. Goodrich E-107M propellant. It was launched two times, on May 18 and 19, 1960 from Wallops Island to an apogee of 80 km.

=== ASP-V ===
ASP-V was to utilize a polysulfide propellant but erratic burning and resultant burn through proved insoluble. ASP-V was canceled.

=== ASPAN ===
ASP was combined with a Nike booster to create the ASPAN which exceeded performance of the Nike-Cajun and Nike Deacon.

=== Pogo-Hi-III ===
This is a single stage vehicle using an ASP motor, intended as a high-altitude radar target. It was launched three times from White Sands in 1959 to an apogee of 60 km.

=== ASCAMP ===
When ASP-I was combined with a one-fifth scale Sergeant this was designates as ASCAMP (also known as Nike-ASP). ASCAMP had to be launched from a remotely controlled launcher due to the necessary closeness to the nuclear blast. It was launched 27 times in August 1958 from Johnston Island to an apogee of 100 km.

== Stages ==
The following table summarizes the various ASP versions and stages:

ASP versions and stages
Version	Booster	Stage 1	Stage 2
ASP-I	-	ASP-I	-
ASP-II	-	ASP-II	-
ASP-III	2 or 4 Loki	ASP-II	-
ASP-IV	-	ASP-IV	-
Pogo-Hi-3	-	ASP-I	-
ASCAMP	-	ASP-I	RM-3141 (Baby Sergeant)
ASP Apache	-	ASP-I	Apache / TE-307-2
