= Johnston Atoll =

Unincorporated territory of the US

- United States Minor Outlying Islands
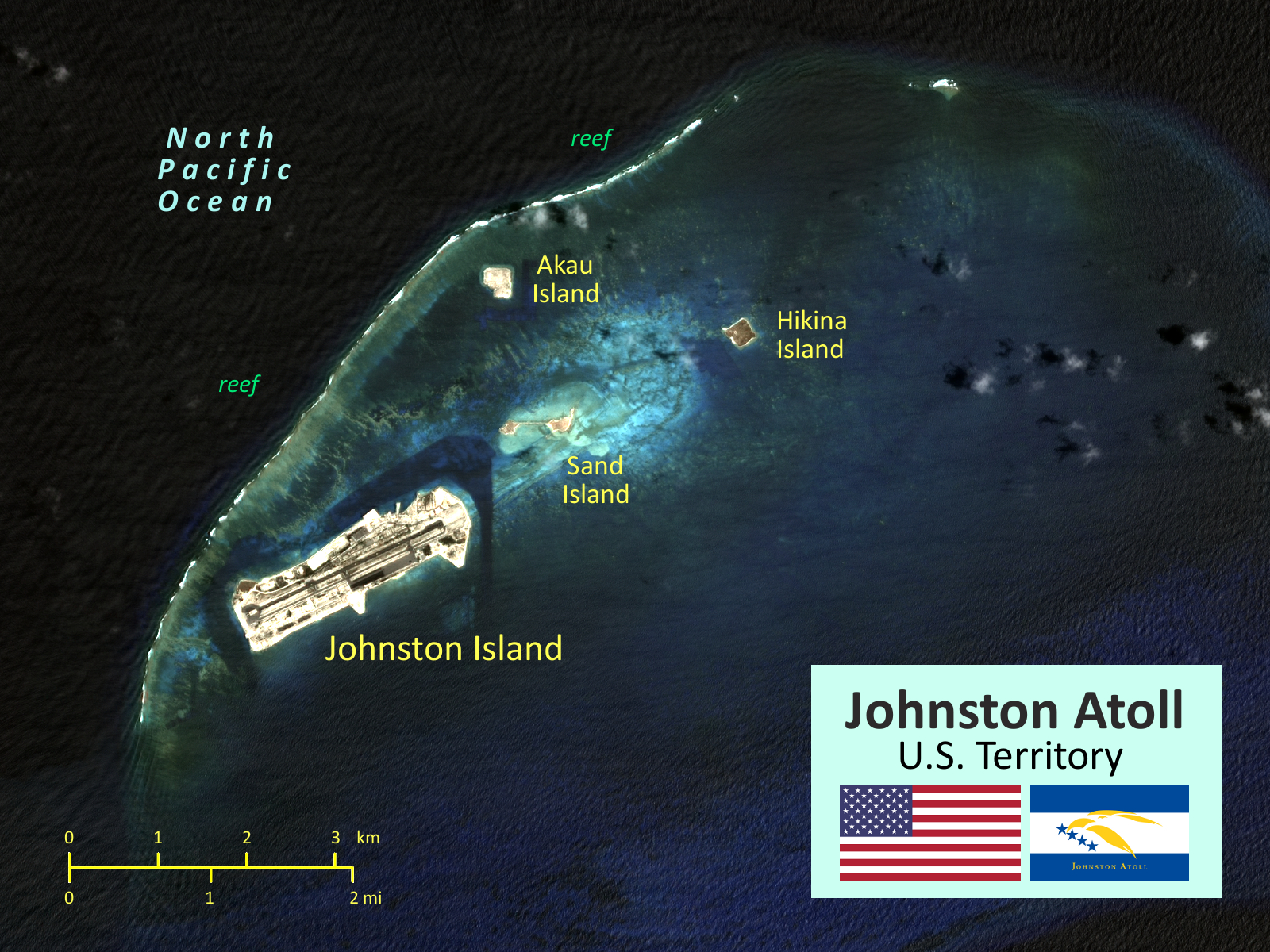
- Annotated satellite image of Johnston Atoll

- Location in the North Pacific Ocean
- Coordinates: 16°44′13″N 169°31′26″W
- Country: United States
- Status: Unorganized, unincorporated territory
- Claimed by U.S.: March 19, 1858
- Named for: Captain Charles James Johnston, HMS Cornwallis

Government
  - Type: Administered as a National Wildlife Refuge
  - Body: United States Fish and Wildlife Service
  - Superintendent: Laura Beauregard, Pacific Islands Heritage Marine National Monument

Area
  - Total: 1.03 sq mi (2.67 km^{2})
  - EEZ: 157,389 sq mi (407,635 km^{2})
- Highest elevation (Sand Island): 33 ft (10 m)
- Lowest elevation (Pacific Ocean): 0 ft (0 m)

Population (2020)
  - Total: 10 (non-permanent)
- Time zone: UTC−10 (Hawaii–Aleutian Time Zone)
- Geocode: 127
- ISO 3166 code: UM
- Website: www.fws.gov/refuge/Johnston_Atoll/

Johnston Atoll is an unincorporated territory of the United States, under the jurisdiction of the United States Air Force (USAF). The island is closed to public entry, and limited access for management needs is only granted by a letter of authorization from the USAF. A special use permit is also required from the United States Fish and Wildlife Service (USFWS) to access the island by boat or enter the waters surrounding the island, which are designated as a National Wildlife Refuge and part of the Pacific Islands Heritage Marine National Monument. The Johnston Atoll National Wildlife Refuge extends from the shore out to 12 nautical miles, continuing as part of the National Wildlife Refuge System out to 200 nautical miles. The Pacific Remote Islands Marine National Monument extends from the shore out to 200 nautical miles.

The isolated atoll has been under the control of the U.S. military since 1934. During that time, it has been used as a naval refueling depot, an airbase, a testing site for nuclear and biological weapons, a secret missile base, and a site for the storage and disposal of chemical weapons and Agent Orange. Those activities left the area environmentally contaminated. The USAF completed remediating the contamination in 2004 and performs only periodic monitoring today.

The island is home to thriving communities of nesting seabirds and has significant marine biodiversity. USAF and USFWS teams conduct environmental monitoring and maintenance to protect the native wildlife. In the 21st century, one ecological problem was yellow crazy ants that were killing seabirds, but by the 2020s these were eradicated.

The atoll originally consisted of two islands, Johnston and Sand Island surrounded partially by a coral reef. Over the 20th century, those two islands were expanded, and two new islands, North (Akau) and East (Hikina) were created mostly by coral dredging. A long airstrip was built on Johnston, and there are also various channels through the coral reef.

== Geography ==
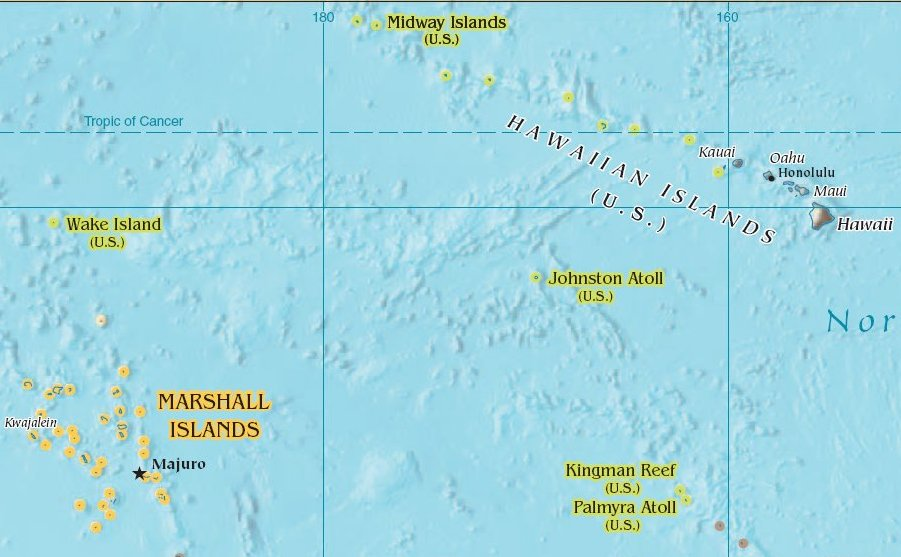
Johnston Atoll is located between the Marshall Islands and the Hawaiian Islands.

Johnston Atoll is a 1,300-hectare (3,200-acre) atoll in the North Pacific Ocean, located about 750 nautical miles (1,390 km; 860 mi) southwest of the island of Hawaiʻi, and is grouped as one of the United States Minor Outlying Islands. The atoll, which is located on a coral reef platform, has four islands. Johnston Island and Sand Island are both enlarged natural features, while Akau (North) and Hikina (East) are two artificial islands formed by coral dredging. By 1964, dredge and fill operations had increased the size of Johnston Island to 596 acres (241 ha) from its original 46 acres (19 ha), increased the size of Sand Island from 10 to 22 acres (4.0 to 8.9 ha), and added the two new islands, North and East, of 25 and 18 acres (10.1 and 7.3 ha) respectively.

Johnston Island has been significantly increased in size through coral dredging.

The four islands compose a total land area of 2.67 square kilometers (1.03 square miles). Due to the atoll's tilt, much of the reef on the southeast portion has subsided. But even though it does not have an encircling reef crest, the reef crest on the northwest portion of the atoll does provide for a shallow lagoon, with depths ranging from 3 to 10 m (10 to 33 ft).

== Climate ==
The climate is tropical but generally dry. Northeast trade winds are consistent. There is little seasonal temperature variation. With elevation ranging from sea level to 5 m (16 ft) at Summit Peak, the islands contain some low-growing vegetation and palm trees on mostly flat terrain, and no natural freshwater resources.

Areas (ha)
Island	1942	1964 (final)
Johnston Island	19	241
Sand Island	4	9
North (Akau) Island	N/A	10
East (Hikina) Island	N/A	7
Total land area	23	267
Johnston Atoll	13,000	13,000

Johnston Atoll has a hot semi-arid climate (Köppen: BSh; Trewartha: BSha). It is a dry atoll with just over 26 inches (660 mm) of annual rainfall.

Climate data for Johnston Atoll (1991–2020 normals, extremes 1953–2003)
Month	Jan	Feb	Mar	Apr	May	Jun	Jul	Aug	Sep	Oct	Nov	Dec	Year
Record high °F (°C)	90 (32)	89 (32)	90 (32)	90 (32)	91 (33)	100 (38)	101 (38)	100 (38)	95 (35)	95 (35)	96 (36)	89 (32)	101 (38)
Mean maximum °F (°C)	87.3 (30.7)	87.2 (30.7)	87.7 (30.9)	88.6 (31.4)	89.7 (32.1)	92.2 (33.4)	92.4 (33.6)	92.8 (33.8)	92.3 (33.5)	91.3 (32.9)	89.2 (31.8)	87.5 (30.8)	93.5 (34.2)
Mean daily maximum °F (°C)	83.8 (28.8)	84.1 (28.9)	84.4 (29.1)	85.6 (29.8)	87.1 (30.6)	88.9 (31.6)	89.4 (31.9)	89.9 (32.2)	89.7 (32.1)	88.2 (31.2)	85.8 (29.9)	84.5 (29.2)	86.8 (30.4)
Daily mean °F (°C)	78.6 (25.9)	78.7 (25.9)	78.9 (26.1)	79.9 (26.6)	81.3 (27.4)	83.0 (28.3)	83.6 (28.7)	84.1 (28.9)	83.9 (28.8)	82.9 (28.3)	81.0 (27.2)	79.5 (26.4)	81.3 (27.4)
Mean daily minimum °F (°C)	73.4 (23.0)	73.4 (23.0)	73.4 (23.0)	74.2 (23.4)	75.5 (24.2)	77.1 (25.1)	77.8 (25.4)	78.4 (25.8)	78.1 (25.6)	77.5 (25.3)	76.2 (24.6)	74.6 (23.7)	75.8 (24.3)
Mean minimum °F (°C)	69.1 (20.6)	69.8 (21.0)	69.2 (20.7)	70.7 (21.5)	71.9 (22.2)	73.8 (23.2)	73.9 (23.3)	74.3 (23.5)	74.4 (23.6)	73.5 (23.1)	71.7 (22.1)	69.8 (21.0)	67.1 (19.5)
Record low °F (°C)	63 (17)	64 (18)	65 (18)	65 (18)	68 (20)	69 (21)	70 (21)	70 (21)	71 (22)	68 (20)	63 (17)	62 (17)	62 (17)
Average precipitation inches (mm)	1.75 (44)	1.23 (31)	2.79 (71)	1.74 (44)	1.02 (26)	0.83 (21)	1.52 (39)	1.93 (49)	2.91 (74)	3.98 (101)	3.90 (99)	2.73 (69)	26.33 (669)
Average precipitation days (≥ 0.01 inch)	11.2	8.9	12.2	12.0	10.0	10.4	12.2	11.9	14.3	16.0	12.7	13.9	145.7
Source: NOAA

== Wildlife ==
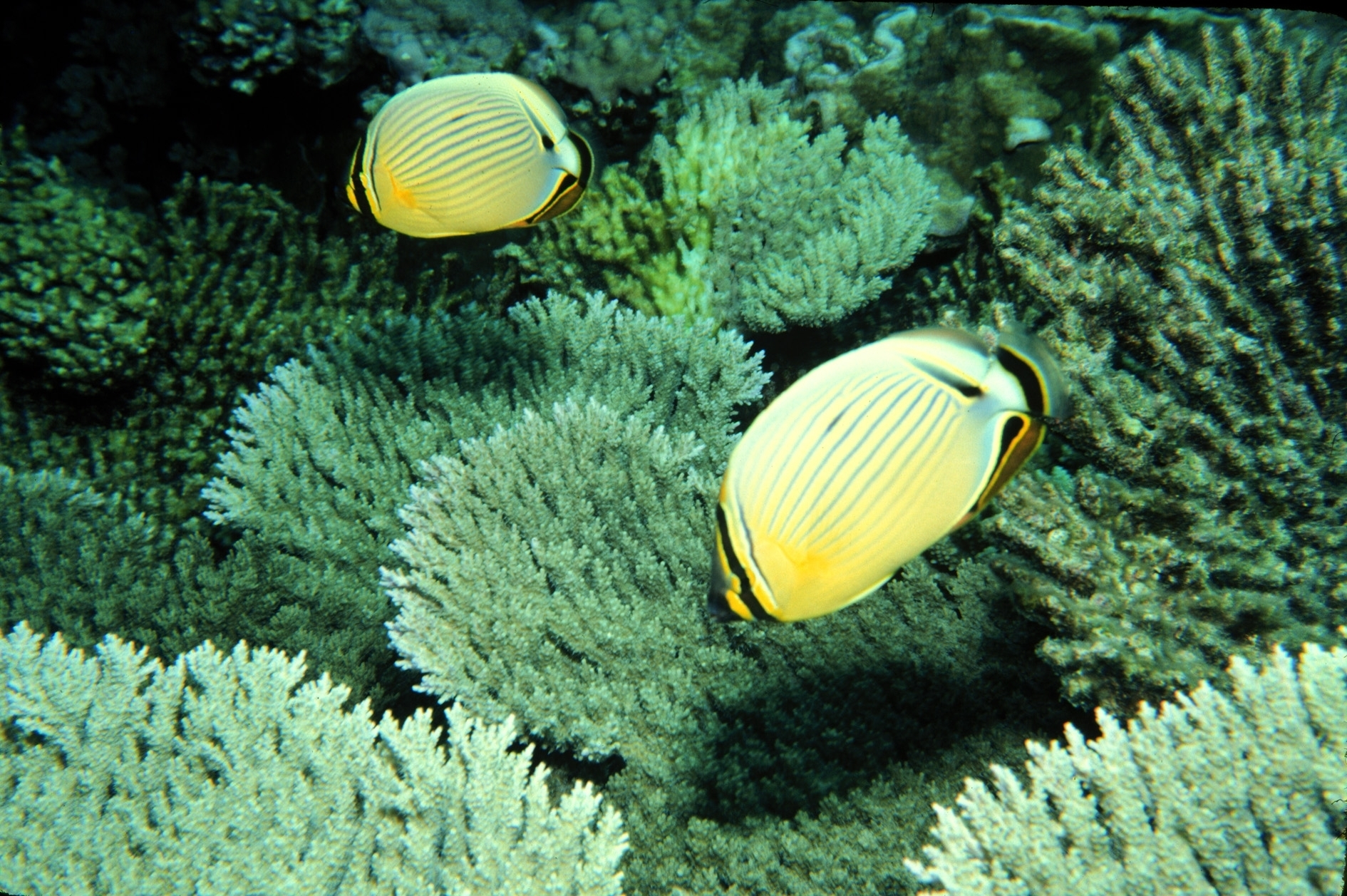
Butterflyfish swim in Johnston Atoll corals

About 300 species of fish have been recorded from the reefs and inshore waters of the atoll. It is also visited by green turtles and Hawaiian monk seals. The possibility of humpback whales using the waters as a breeding ground has been suggested, albeit in small numbers and with irregular occurrences. Many other cetaceans possibly migrate through the area, including Cuvier's beaked whales.

=== Birds ===
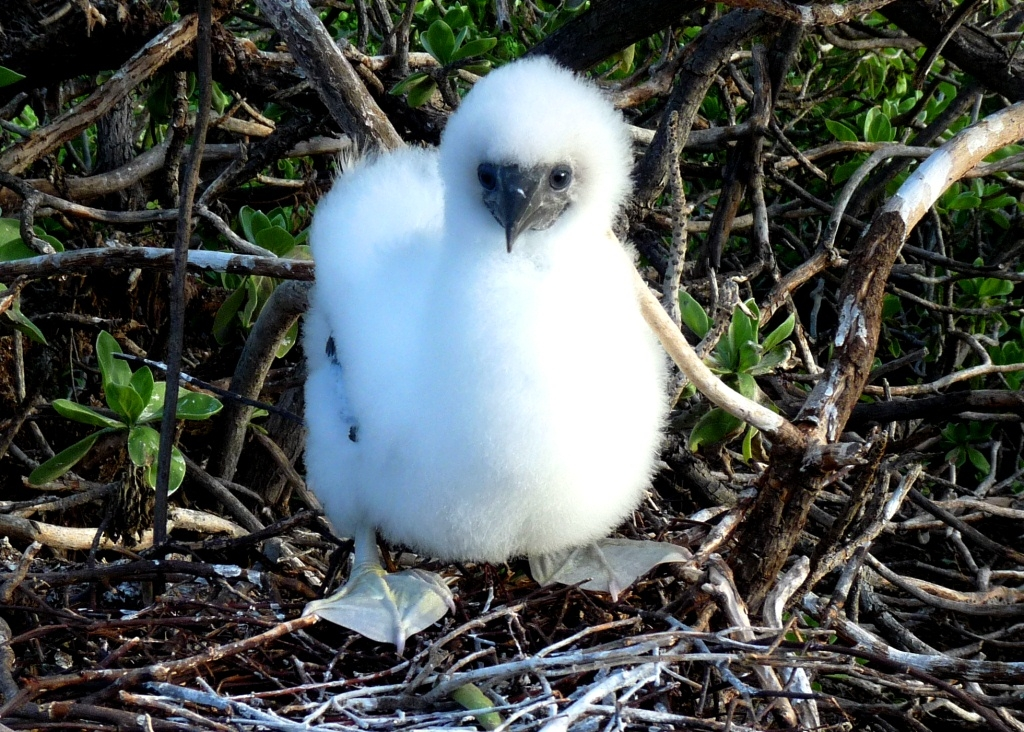
Juvenile Red-footed booby seabird on Johnston Island, 2012

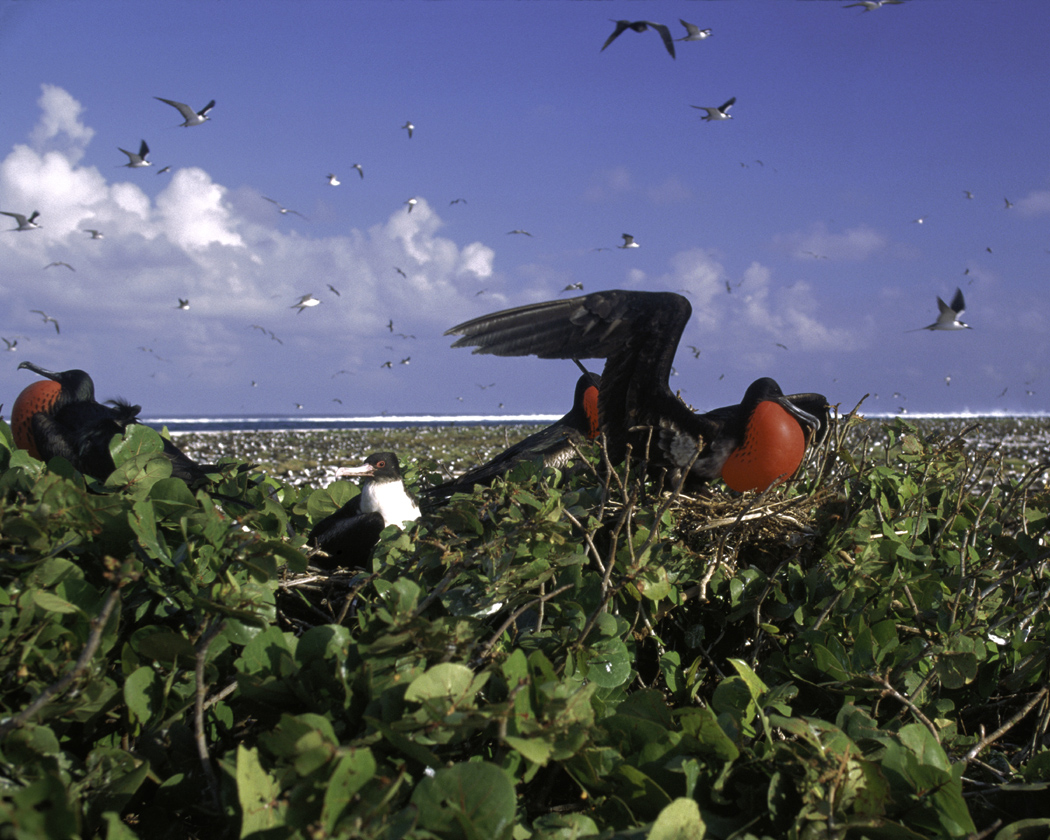
Great frigatebirds on Johnston

Seabird species recorded as breeding on the atoll include Bulwer's petrel, wedge-tailed shearwater, Christmas shearwater, white-tailed tropicbird, red-tailed tropicbird, brown booby, red-footed booby, masked booby, great frigatebird, spectacled tern, sooty tern, brown noddy, black noddy, and white tern. It is the world's largest colony of red-tailed tropicbirds, with 10,800 nests in 2020. It is visited by migratory shorebirds, including the Pacific golden plover, wandering tattler, bristle-thighed curlew, ruddy turnstone and sanderling. The island, with its surrounding marine waters, has been recognized as an Important Bird Area by BirdLife International for its seabird colonies.

== Flora ==
The first list of plants cataloged on Johnston Atoll was published in Vascular Plants of Johnston and Wake Islands (1931), based on the Tanager Expedition (1923) collections. Three species were described: Lepturus repens, Boerhavia diffusa, and Tribulus cistoides. In the 1940s, when the island was used for aviation activities for the war, Pluchea odorata was introduced from Honolulu.

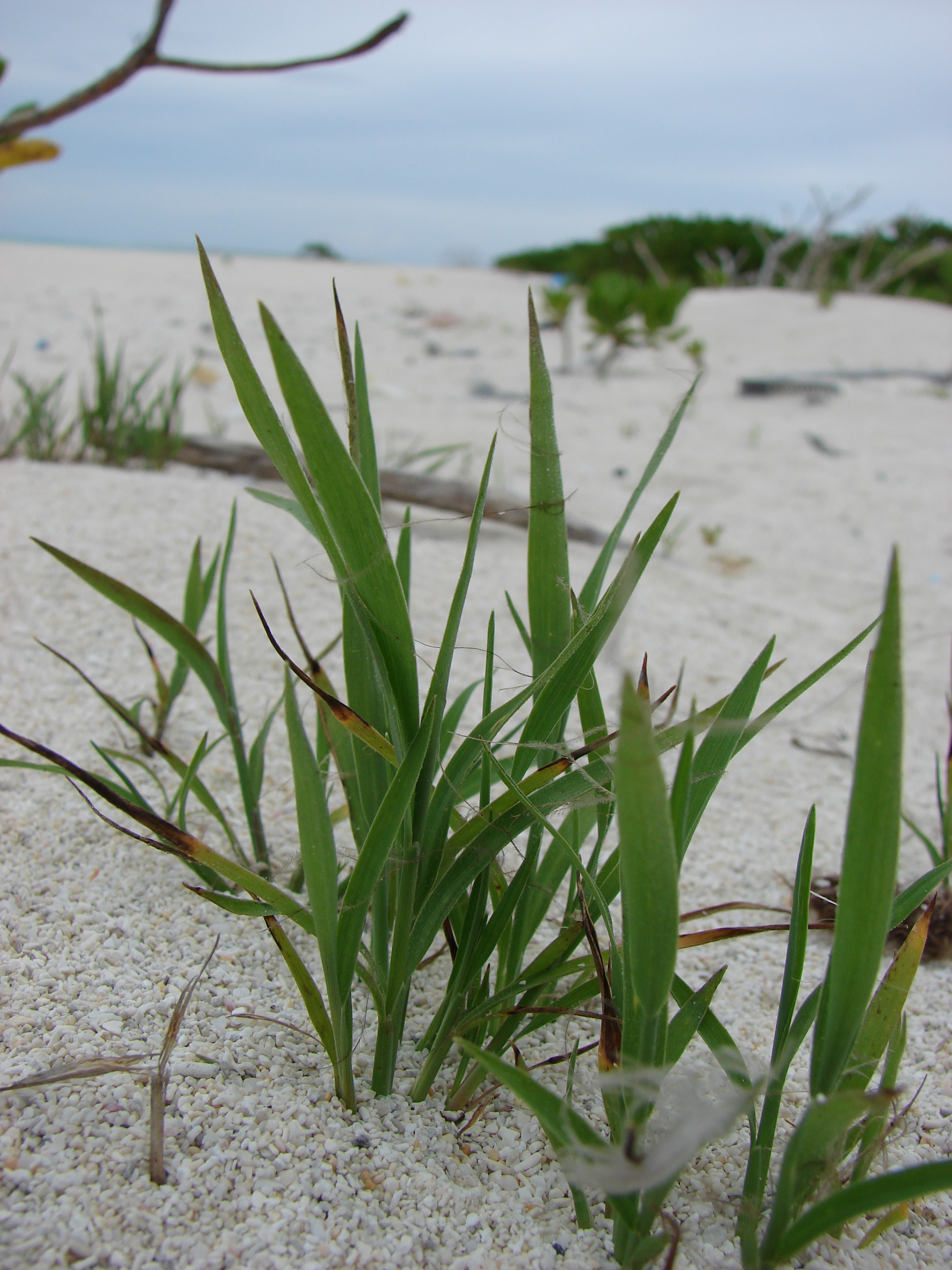
Lepturus repens

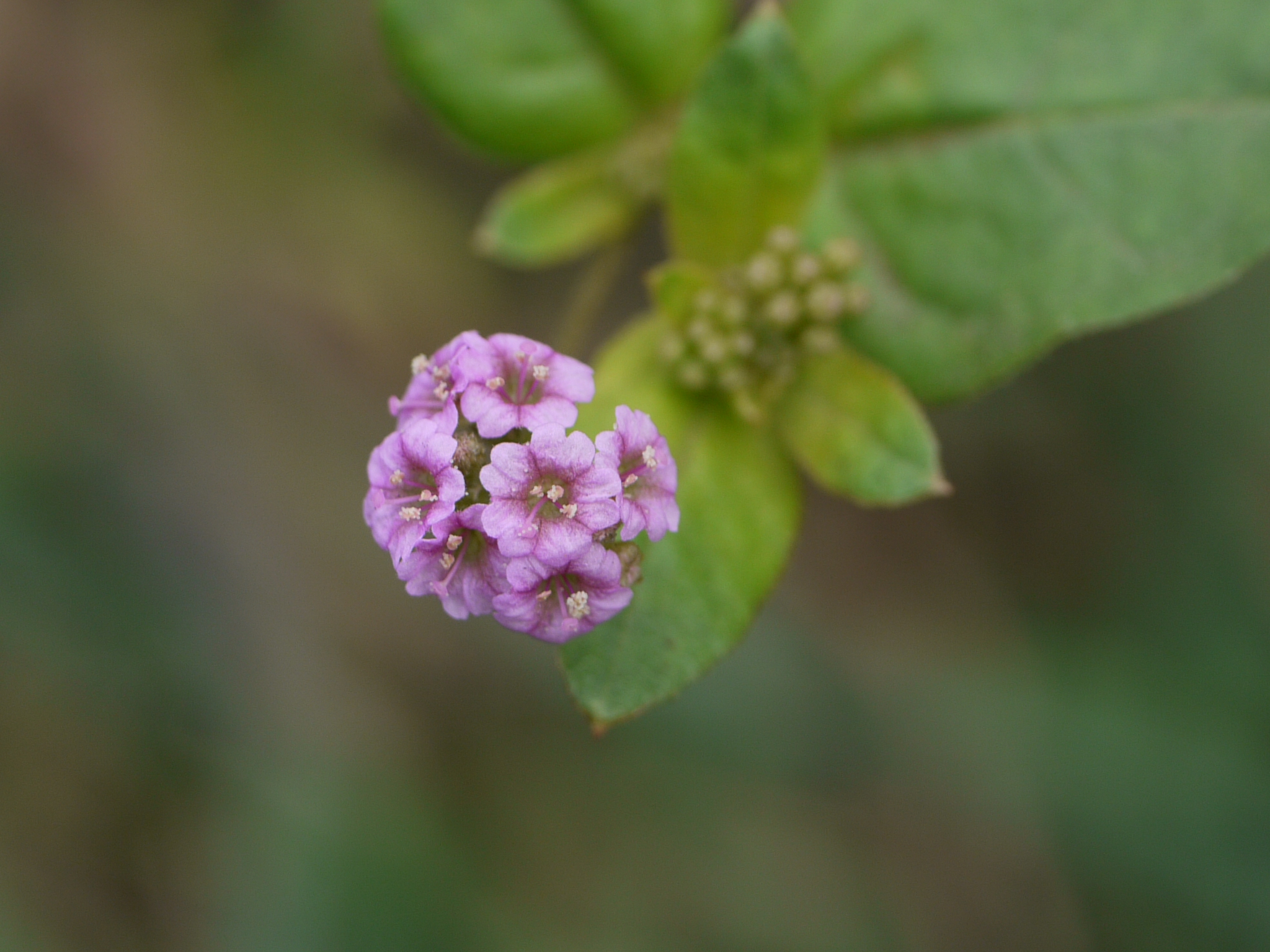
Boerhavia diffusa

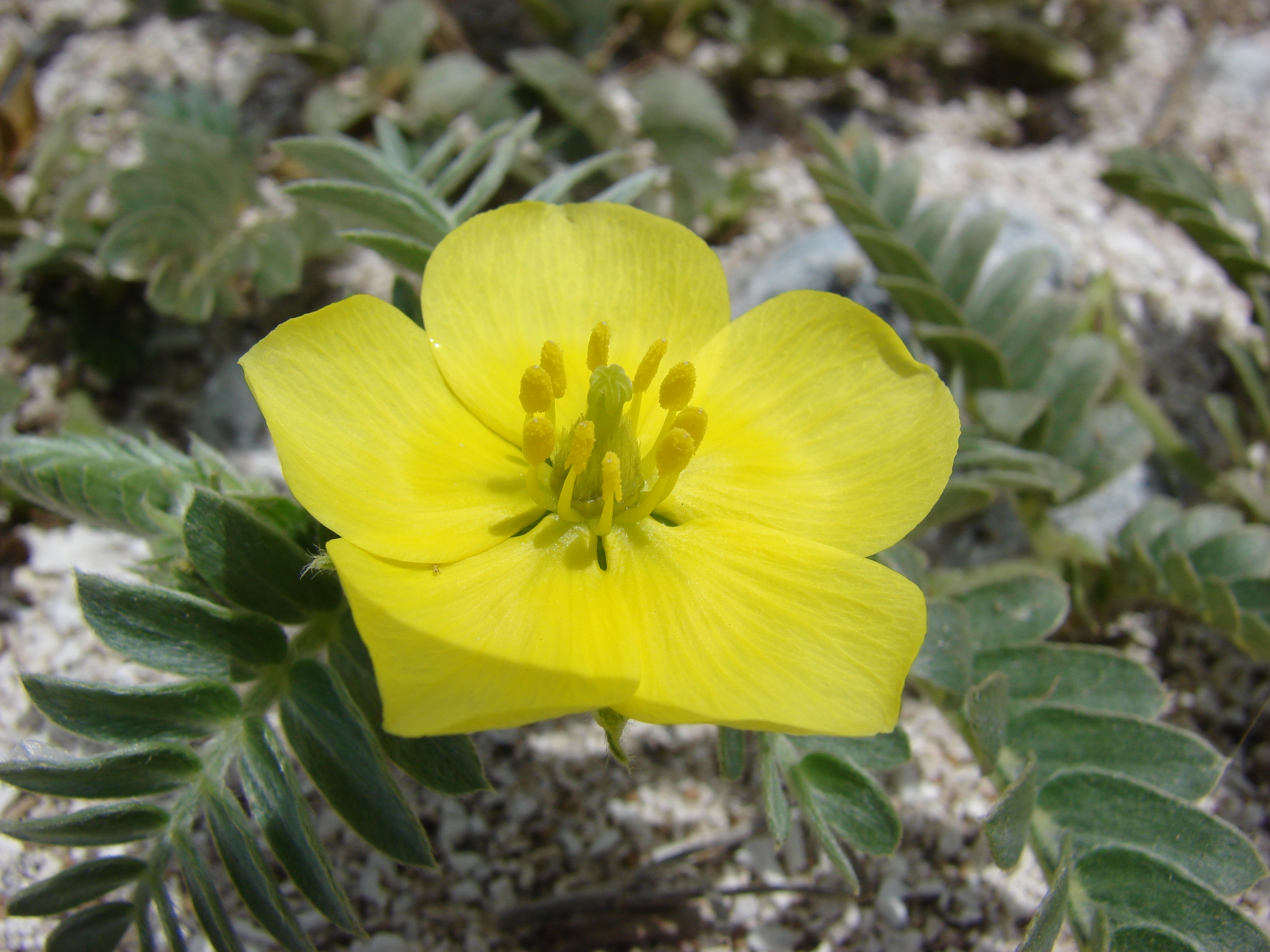
Tribulus cistoides

== History ==
=== Early history ===
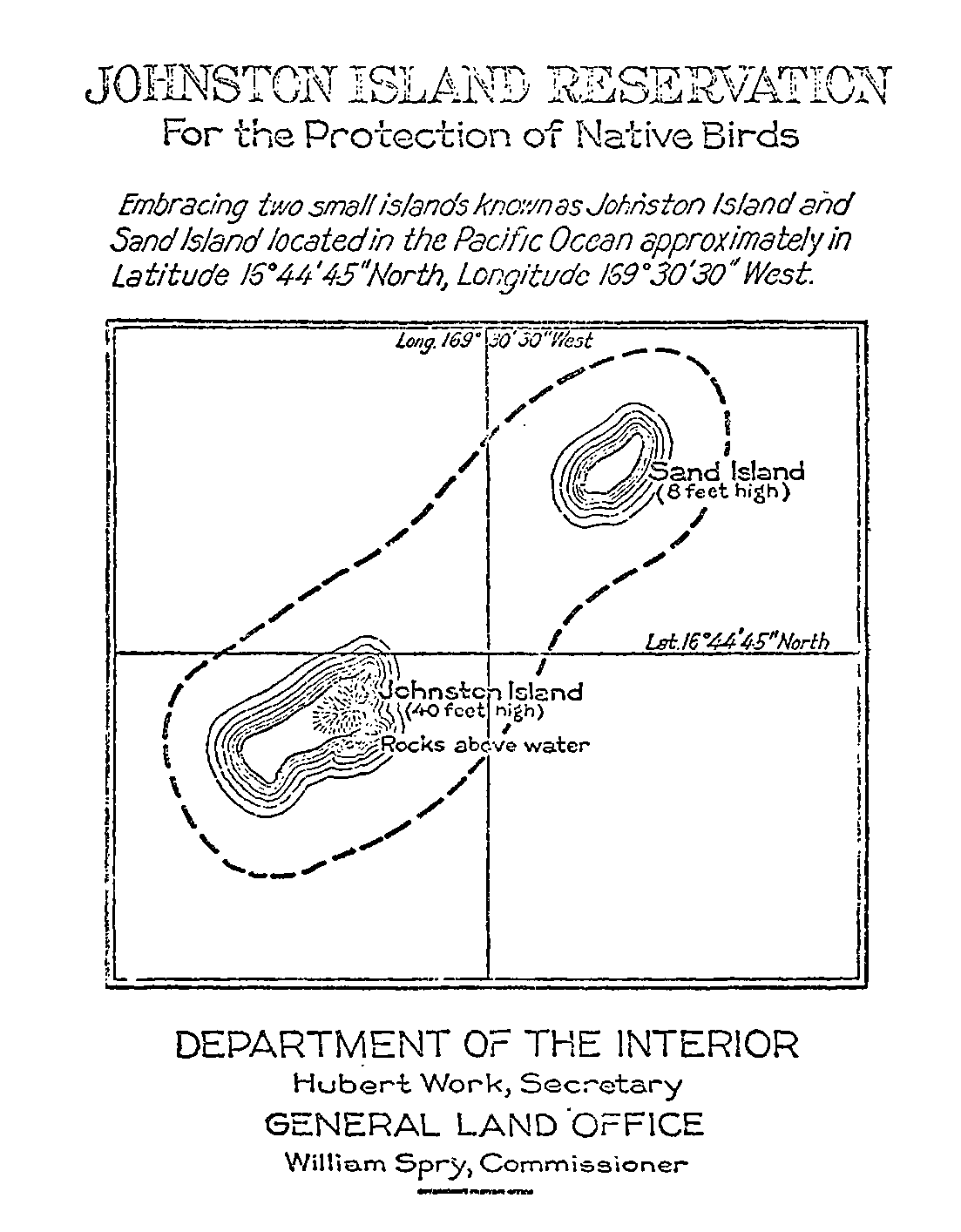
Johnston and Sand island when it was a bird reserve

The first Western record of the atoll was on September 2, 1796, when the Boston-based American brig Sally accidentally grounded on a shoal near the islands. The ship's captain, Joseph Pierpont, published his experience in several American newspapers the following year, accurately portraying Johnston and Sand Island along with part of the reef. Still, he did not name or lay claim to the area. The islands were not named until after they were sighted on December 14, 1807, from HMS Cornwallis of the Royal Navy, commanded by Captain Charles James Johnston. The ship's journal recorded: "on the 14th [December] made a new discovery, viz. two very low islands, in lat. 16° 52′ N. long. 190° 26′ E., having a dangerous reef to the east of them, and the whole not exceeding four miles in extent".

In 1856, the United States enacted the Guano Islands Act, which allowed U.S. citizens to take possession of uninhabited and unclaimed islands containing guano deposits. Under this act, William Parker and R. F. Ryan chartered the schooner Palestine specifically to find Johnston Atoll. They located guano on the atoll on March 19, 1858. They proceeded to claim the island as U.S. territory. That same year, S. C. Allen, sailing on the Kalama under a commission from King Kamehameha IV of Hawaiʻi, sailed to Johnston Atoll, removed the American flag, and claimed the atoll for the Kingdom of Hawaii (June 14–19, 1858). Allen named the atoll "Kalama" and the nearby smaller island "Cornwallis."

Returning on July 22, 1858, the captain of the Palestine again hoisted the American flag to re-assert US sovereignty over the island. On July 27, however, the "derelict and abandoned" atoll was declared part of the domain of Kamehameha IV. On its July visit, however, the Palestine left two crew members on the island to gather phosphate. Later that year, Kamehameha revoked the lease granted to Allen when he learned the atoll had been claimed previously by the United States.

In 1872, Parker's widow sued for title to the island based on her husband's development work there. The U.S. Attorney General denied that claim because Parker had sold his share several years before.

By 1890, the atoll's guano deposits had been almost entirely depleted (mined out) by U.S. interests operating under the Guano Islands Act. In 1892, HMS Champion surveyed and mapped the island to determine its suitability as a telegraph cable station. (This investigation was dropped when it was decided to run the cable via Fanning Island). By 1898, the United States had taken possession, and a U.S. Territorial Government was established. On September 11, 1909, this office leased Johnston Atoll to a private citizen, Max Schlemmen of Honolulu, for agricultural purposes. The lease stipulated planting of coconut trees, and that "lessee will not allow use of explosives . . in the water immediately adjacent . . for the purposes of killing or capturing fish . . lessee will not allow destruction or capturing of birds . . " The lessee soon abandoned the project, however, and on August 9, 1918, the lease was reassigned to a Honolulu-based Japanese fishing company. A sampan carried a work party to the island; they built a wood shed on the SE coast of the larger island and ran a small tramline up the slope of the low hill to facilitate the removal of guano. Neither the quantity nor the quality of the guano was sufficient to cover the cost of gathering it, and the project was soon abandoned.

=== National Wildlife Refuge since 1926 ===
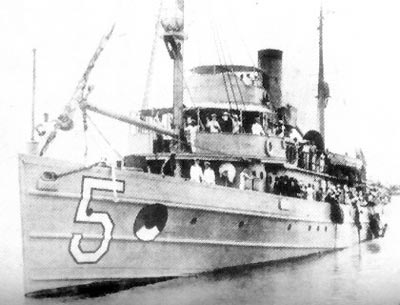
USS Tanager with members of the 1923 Tanager Expedition

The Tanager Expedition was a joint expedition sponsored by the U.S. Department of Agriculture and the Bishop Museum of Hawaii, which visited the atoll in 1923. The expedition to the atoll consisted of two teams accompanied by destroyer convoys, with the first departing Honolulu on July 7, 1923, aboard the USS Whippoorwill, which conducted the first survey of Johnston Island in the 20th century. Aerial survey and mapping flights over Johnston were conducted with a Douglas DT-2 floatplane carried on her fantail, which was hoisted into the water for takeoff. July 10–22, 1923, the atoll was recorded in a pioneering aerial photography project. The USS Tanager left Honolulu on July 16 and joined up with the Whippoorwill to complete the survey and then traveled to Wake Island to complete surveys there. Tents were pitched on the southwest beach of fine white sand, and a thorough biological survey was made. Hundreds of sea birds of a dozen kinds were the principal inhabitants, together with lizards, insects, and hermit crabs. The reefs and shallow water abounded with fish and other marine life.

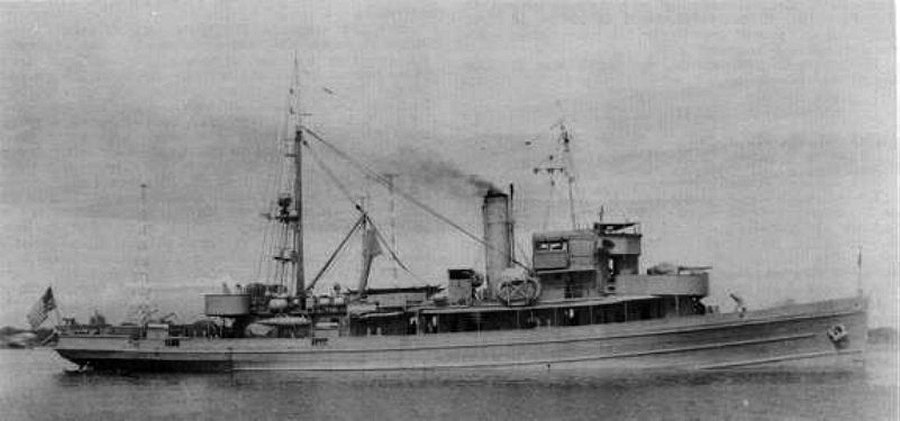
USS Whippoorwill

On June 29, 1926, by Executive Order 4467, President Calvin Coolidge established Johnston Island Reservation as a federal bird refuge and placed it under the U.S. Department of Agriculture, as a "refuge and breeding ground for native birds." Johnston Atoll was added to the United States National Wildlife Refuge system in 1926, and renamed the Johnston Island National Wildlife Refuge in 1940. The Johnston Atoll National Wildlife Refuge was established to protect the tropical ecosystem and the wildlife that it harbors. However, the Department of Agriculture had no ships, and the United States Navy was interested in the atoll for strategic reasons, so with Executive Order 6935 on December 29, 1934, President Franklin D. Roosevelt placed the islands under the "control and jurisdiction of the Secretary of the Navy for administrative purposes", but subject to use as a refuge and breeding ground for native birds, under the United States Department of the Interior.

On February 14, 1941, President Franklin Roosevelt issued Executive Order 8682 to create naval defense areas in the central Pacific territories. The proclamation established the "Johnston Island Naval Defensive Sea Area", encompassing the territorial waters between the extreme high-water marks and the three-mile marine boundaries surrounding the atoll. "Johnston Island Naval Airspace Reservation" was also established to restrict access to the airspace over the naval defense sea area. Only U.S. government ships and aircraft were permitted to enter the naval defense areas at Johnston unless authorized by the Secretary of the Navy.

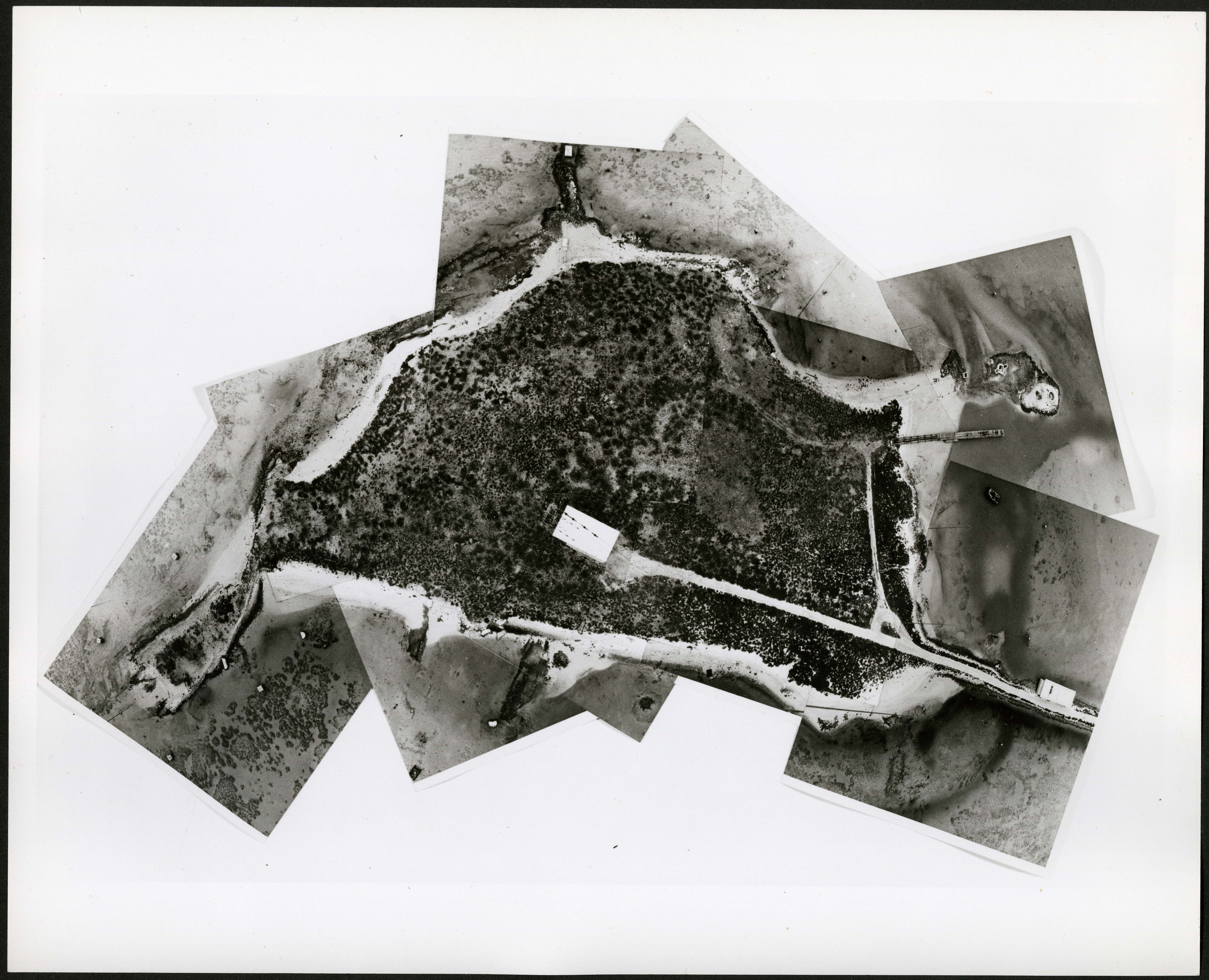
Aerial photos of Sand island in 1964 for the Pacific Ocean Biological Survey Program

In 1990, two full-time U.S. Fish and Wildlife Service personnel, a Refuge Manager and a biologist, were stationed on Johnston Atoll to handle increased biological, contaminant, and resource conflict activities.

After the military mission on the island ended in 2004, the atoll was administered by the Pacific Remote Islands National Wildlife Refuge Complex. The outer islets and water rights were managed cooperatively by the Fish and Wildlife Service, with some of the actual Johnston Island land mass remaining under the control of the United States Air Force (USAF) for environmental remediation and the Defense Threat Reduction Agency (DTRA) for plutonium cleanup purposes. However, on January 6, 2009, under the authority of section 2 of the Antiquities Act, the Pacific Remote Islands Marine National Monument was established by President George W. Bush to administer and protect Johnston Island along with six other Pacific islands. The national monument includes Johnston Atoll National Wildlife Refuge within its boundaries and contains 696 acres (2.82 km^{2}) of land and over 800,000 acres (3,200 km^{2}) of water area. The Administration of President Barack Obama in 2014 extended the protected area to encompass the entire Exclusive Economic Zone, by banning all commercial fishing activities. Under a 2017 review of all national monuments extended since 1996, then-Secretary of the Interior Ryan Zinke recommended permitting fishing outside the 12-mile limit.

=== Military control 1934–2004 ===
On December 29, 1934, President Franklin D. Roosevelt with Executive Order 6935 transferred control of Johnston Atoll to the United States Navy under the 14th Naval District, Pearl Harbor, to establish an air station, and also to the United States Department of the Interior to administer the bird refuge. In 1948, the USAF assumed control of the atoll.

Video of Richard Nixon's visit to Johnston Atoll in 1969

During the Operation Hardtack nuclear test series from April 22 to August 19, 1958, the administration of Johnston Atoll was assigned to the Commander of Joint Task Force 7. After the tests were completed, the island reverted to the command of the U.S. Air Force.

Throughout the United States' nuclear program, specifically between the late 1940s to 1962, high-altitude nuclear testing operations were carried out at the atoll.

In 1970, operational control was handed back to the Air Force until July 1973, when Defense Special Weapons Agency was given host-management responsibility by the Secretary of Defense. Over the years, sequential descendant organizations have been the Defense Atomic Support Agency (DASA) from 1959 to 1971, the Defense Nuclear Agency (DNA) from 1971 to 1996, and the Defense Special Weapons Agency (DSWA) from 1996 to 1998. In 1998, Defense Special Weapons Agency and selected elements of the Office of Secretary of Defense were combined to form the Defense Threat Reduction Agency (DTRA). In 1999, host-management responsibility transferred from the Defense Threat Reduction Agency once again to the Air Force until the Air Force mission ended in 2004 and the base was closed.

=== Sand Island seaplane base ===
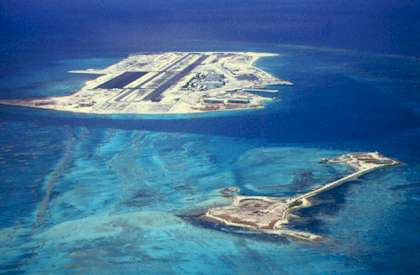
Aerial approach to the former base on Johnston Island (top). The ship channel is visible as a darker blue area starting at left and continuing up around the right side of Johnston Island, with Sand Island on the near side (bottom).

In 1935, personnel from the U.S. Navy's Patrol Wing Two carried out some minor construction to develop the atoll for seaplane operation. In 1936, the Navy began the first of many changes to enlarge the atoll's land area. They erected some buildings and a boat landing on Sand Island and blasted coral to clear a 3,600-foot (1,100 m) seaplane landing. Several seaplanes made flights from Hawaii to Johnston, such as that of a squadron of six aircraft in November 1935.

In November 1939, civilian contractors commenced further work on Sand Island to allow the operation of one squadron of patrol planes with tender support. Part of the lagoon was dredged, and the excavated material was used to make a parking area connected by a 2,000-foot (610 m) causeway to Sand Island. Three seaplane landings were cleared, one 11,000 by 1,000 feet (3,350 by 300 m) and two cross-landings each 7,000 by 800 feet (2,130 by 240 m) and dredged to a depth of 8 feet (2.4 m). Sand Island had barracks built for 400 men, a mess hall, an underground hospital, a radio station, water tanks, and a 100-foot (30 m) steel control tower. In December 1943 an additional 10 acres (4.0 hectares) of parking was added to the seaplane base.

On May 26, 1942, a United States Navy Consolidated PBY-5 Catalina wrecked at Johnston Atoll. The Catalina pilot made a normal power landing and immediately applied the throttle for take-off. At about 50 knots, the plane swerved to the left and continued into a violent waterloop. The plane's hull was broken open, and the Catalina sank immediately.

After the war, on March 27, 1949, a PBY-6A Catalina had to make a forced landing during a flight from Kwajalein to Johnston Island. The plane was damaged beyond repair, and the crew of 11 was rescued nine hours later by a Navy ship, which sank the plane using gunfire.

In 1958, a proposed support agreement for Navy Seaplane operations at Johnston Island was under discussion, though it was never completed because a requirement for the operation failed to materialize.

=== Airfield ===
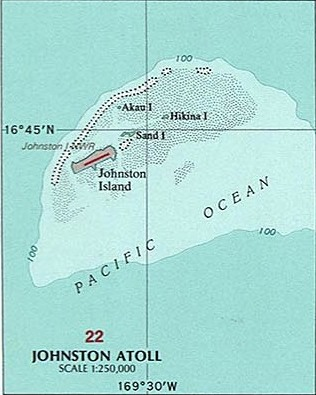
Map of Johnston Atoll from a 1970 atlas

By September 1941, construction of an airfield on Johnston Island commenced. A 4,000-by-500-foot (1,220 by 150 m) runway was built with two 400-man barracks, two mess halls, a cold-storage building, an underground hospital, a fresh-water plant, shop buildings, and fuel storage. The runway was complete by December 7, 1941, though in December 1943, the 99th Naval Construction Battalion arrived at the atoll and proceeded to lengthen the runway to 6,000 feet (1,800 m). The runway was lengthened and improved as the island was enlarged.

During World War II, Johnston Atoll was used as a refueling base for submarines and also as an aircraft refueling stop for American bombers transiting the Pacific Ocean, including the Boeing B-29 Enola Gay. By 1944, the atoll was one of the busiest air transport terminals in the Pacific. Air Transport Command aeromedical evacuation planes stopped at Johnston en route to Hawaii. Following V-J Day on August 14, 1945, Johnston Atoll saw the flow of men and aircraft coming from the mainland into the Pacific turn around. By 1947, over 1,300 B-29 and B-24 bombers had passed through the Marianas, Kwajalein, Johnston Island, and Oahu en route to Mather Field and civilian life.

Following World War II, Johnston Atoll Airport was used commercially by Continental Air Micronesia, touching down between Honolulu and Majuro. When the aircraft landed, soldiers surrounded the aircraft, and passengers were not allowed to leave the aircraft. Aloha Airlines also made weekly scheduled flights to the island carrying civilian and military personnel. In the 1990s, there were flights almost daily. Some days saw up to three arrivals. Just before movement of the chemical munitions to Johnston Atoll, the Surgeon General, Public Health Service, reviewed the shipment and the Johnston Atoll storage plans. His recommendations caused the Secretary of Defense to issue instructions in December 1970 to suspend missile launches and all non-essential aircraft flights. As a result, Air Micronesia's service was immediately discontinued, and missile firings were terminated, except for two 1975 satellite launches deemed critical to the island's mission.

There were many times when the runway was needed for emergency landings for civil and military aircraft. When the runway was decommissioned, it could no longer be a potential emergency landing place when planning flight routes across the Pacific Ocean. As of 2003, the airfield at Johnston Atoll consisted of an unmaintained closed single 9,000-foot (2,700 m) asphalt/concrete runway 5/23, a parallel taxiway, and a large paved ramp along the southeast side of the runway.

=== World War II 1941–1945 ===
In February 1941, Johnston Atoll was designated a Naval Defensive Sea Area and Airspace Reservation. On the day the Japanese struck Pearl Harbor, December 7, 1941, USS Indianapolis was out of her home port of Pearl Harbor to make a simulated bombardment at Johnston Island. Japan's strike at Pearl Harbor occurred as the ship was unloading marines, civilians, and stores on the atoll. On December 15, 1941, the atoll was shelled outside the reef by a Japanese submarine, which had been part of the attack on Pearl Harbor eight days earlier. Several buildings, including the power station, were hit, but no personnel were injured. Additional Japanese shelling occurred on December 22 and 23, 1941. On all occasions, Johnston Atoll's coastal artillery returned fire, driving off the sub.

In July 1942, the civilian contractors at the atoll were replaced by 500 men from the 5th and 10th Naval Construction Battalions, who expanded the fuel storage and water production at the base and built additional facilities. The 5th Battalion departed in January 1943. In December 1943, the 99th Naval Construction Battalion arrived at the atoll. It proceeded to lengthen the runway to 6,000 feet (1,800 m) and add 10 acres (4.0 ha) of parking to the seaplane base.

=== Coast Guard mission 1957–1992 ===
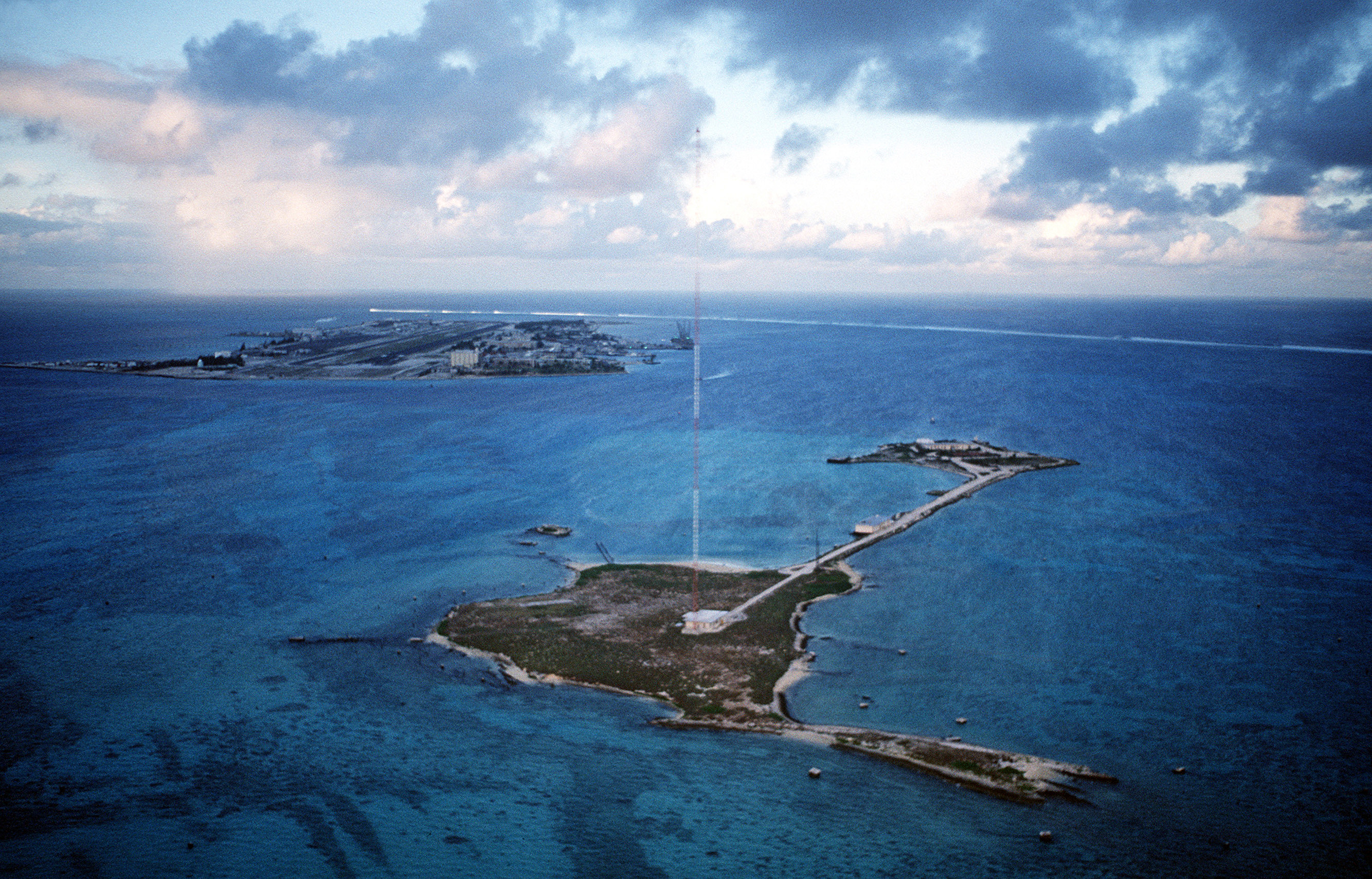
Sand Island in 1990 (foreground) with the U.S. Coast Guard LORAN Station.

On January 25, 1957, the Department of Treasury was granted a 5-year permit for the United States Coast Guard (USCG) to operate and maintain a Long Range Aid to Navigation (LORAN) transmitting station on Johnston Atoll. Two years later, in December 1959, the Secretary of Defense approved the Secretary of the Treasury's request to use Sand Island for U.S. Coast Guard LORAN A and C station sites. The USCG was granted permission to install a LORAN A and C station on Sand Island to be staffed by U.S. Coast Guard personnel through June 30, 1992. The permit for a LORAN station to operate on Johnston Island was terminated in 1962. On November 1, 1957, a new United States Coast Guard LORAN-A station was commissioned. By 1958, the Coast Guard LORAN Station at Johnston Island began transmitting on a 24-hour basis, thus establishing a new LORAN rate in the Central Pacific. The new rate between Johnston Island and French Frigate Shoals gave a higher order of accuracy for fixing positions in the steamship lanes from Oahu, Hawaii, to Midway Island. In the past, this was impossible in some areas along this important shipping route. The original U.S. Coast Guard LORAN-A Station on Johnston Island ceased operations on June 30, 1961, when the new station on nearby Sand Island began transmitting using a larger 180-foot antenna.

The LORAN-C station was disestablished on July 1, 1992, and all Coast Guard personnel, electronic equipment, and property departed that month. Buildings on Sand Island were transferred to other activities. LORAN whip antennas on Johnston and Sand Islands were removed, and the 625-foot LORAN tower and antenna were demolished on December 3, 1992. The LORAN A and C stations and buildings on Sand Island were then dismantled and removed.

=== National nuclear weapon test site 1958–1963 ===
==== Successes ====
Between 1958 and 1975, Johnston Atoll was used as an American national nuclear test site for atmospheric and extremely high-altitude nuclear explosions in outer space. In 1958, Johnston Atoll was the location of the two "Hardtack I" nuclear tests firings. One conducted August 1, 1958, was codenamed "Hardtack Teak", and one conducted August 12, 1958, was codenamed "Orange." Both tests detonated 3.8-megaton hydrogen bombs launched to high altitudes by rockets from Johnston Atoll.

Johnston Island was also used as the launch site of 124 sounding rockets going up as high as 1,158 kilometers (720 miles). These carried scientific instruments and telemetry equipment, either in support of the nuclear bomb tests or in experimental antisatellite technology.

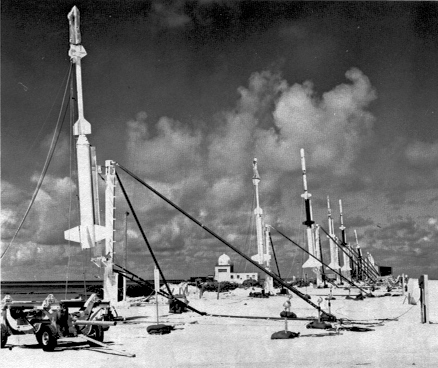
Array of sounding rockets with instruments for making scientific measurements of high-altitude nuclear tests during liftoff preparations in the Scientific Row area on Johnston Island

Eight PGM-17 Thor missiles deployed by the U.S. Air Force (USAF) were launched from Johnston Island in 1962 as part of "Operation Fishbowl," a part of "Operation Dominic" nuclear weapons tests in the Pacific. The first launch in "Operation Fishbowl" was a successful research and development launch with no warhead. In the end, "Operation Fishbowl" produced four successful high-altitude detonations: "Starfish Prime," "Checkmate," "Bluegill Triple Prime," and "Kingfish." In addition, it produced one atmospheric nuclear explosion, "Tightrope."

On July 9, 1962, "Starfish Prime" had a 1.4-megaton explosion, using a W49 warhead at an altitude of about 400 kilometers (250 miles). It created a very brief fireball visible over a wide area, plus bright artificial auroras visible in Hawaii for several minutes. "Starfish Prime" also produced an electromagnetic pulse that disrupted some electric power and communication systems in Hawaii. It pumped enough radiation into the Van Allen belts to destroy or damage seven satellites in orbit.

The final Fishbowl launch that used a Thor missile carried the "Kingfish" 400-kiloton warhead up to its 98-kilometer (61 mi) detonation altitude. Although it was officially one of the Operation Fishbowl tests, it is sometimes not listed among high-altitude nuclear tests because of its lower detonation altitude. "Tightrope" was the final test of Operation Fishbowl and detonated on November 3, 1962. It launched on a nuclear-armed Nike-Hercules missile and was detonated at a lower altitude than the other tests:

"At Johnston Island, there was an intense white flash. Even with high-density goggles, the burst was too bright to view, even for a few seconds. A distinct thermal pulse was felt on bare skin. A yellow-orange disc was formed, and transformed itself into a purple doughnut. A glowing purple cloud was faintly visible for a few minutes." The nuclear yield was reported in most official documents as "less than 20 kilotons." One report by the U.S. government reported the yield of the "Tightrope" test as ten kilotons. Seven sounding rockets were launched from Johnston Island in support of the Tightrope test, and this was the final American nuclear atmospheric test.

==== Failures ====
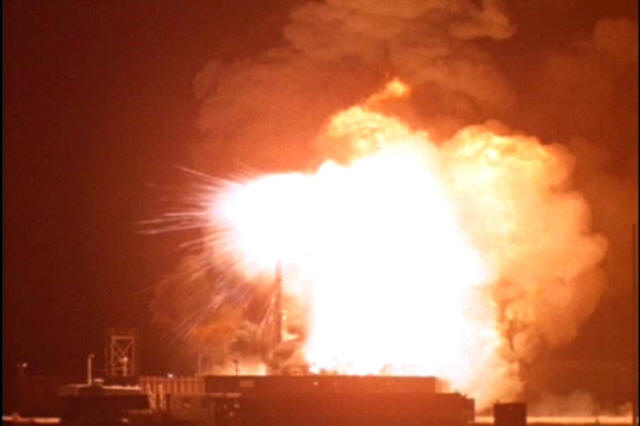
Nuclear-armed Thor missile explodes and burns on the launch pad at Johnston Island during the failed "Bluegill Prime" nuclear test, July 25, 1962

The "Fishbowl" series included four failures, all deliberately disrupted by range safety officers when the missiles' systems failed during launch and were aborted. The second launch of the Fishbowl series, "Bluegill", carried an active warhead. Bluegill was "lost" by a defective range safety tracking radar and had to be destroyed 10 minutes after liftoff, even though it probably ascended successfully. The subsequent nuclear weapon launch failures from Johnston Atoll caused severe contamination to the island and surrounding areas with weapons-grade plutonium and americium that remains an issue to this day.

The failure of the "Bluegill" launch created in effect a dirty bomb but did not release the nuclear warhead's plutonium debris onto Johnston Atoll as the missile fell into the ocean south of the island and was not recovered. However, the "Starfish", "Bluegill Prime", and "Bluegill Double Prime" test launch failures in 1962 scattered radioactive debris over Johnston Island contaminating it, the lagoon, and Sand Island with plutonium for decades.

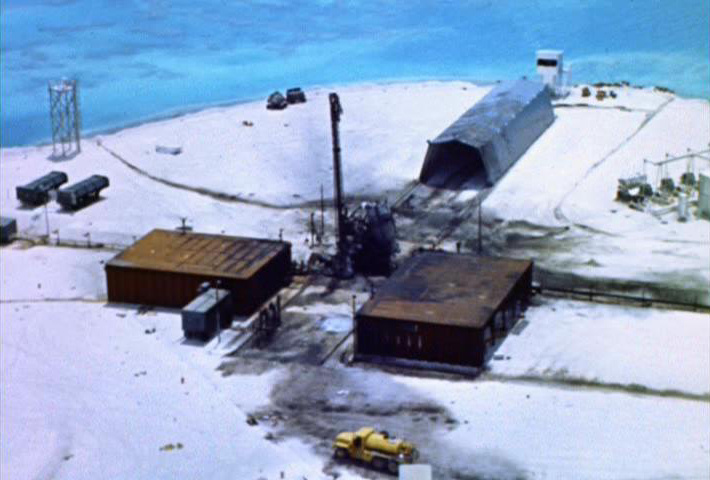
Johnston Island Launch Emplacement One (LE1) after a Thor missile launch failure and explosion contaminated the island with plutonium during the Operation "Bluegill Prime" nuclear test, July 1962

"Starfish", a high altitude Thor launched nuclear test scheduled for June 20, 1962, was the first to contaminate the atoll. The rocket with the 1.45-megaton Starfish device (W49 warhead in the MK-4 re-entry vehicle) on its nose was launched that evening, but the Thor missile engine cut out only 59 seconds after launch. The range safety officer sent a destruct signal 65 seconds after launch, and the missile was destroyed at approximately 10.6 kilometers (6.6 miles) altitude—the warhead high explosive detonated in a 1-point safe fashion, destroying the warhead without producing nuclear yield. Large pieces of the plutonium-contaminated missile, including fragments of the warhead, booster rocket, engine, re-entry vehicle, and missile parts, fell back on Johnston Island. More wreckage, along with plutonium contamination, was found on nearby Sand Island.

"Bluegill Prime," the second attempt to launch the payload, which failed last time, was scheduled for 23:15 (local) on July 25, 1962. It, too, was a genuine disaster and caused the most severe plutonium contamination on the island. The Thor missile carried one pod, two re-entry vehicles, and the W50 nuclear warhead. The missile engine malfunctioned immediately after ignition, and the range safety officer fired the destruct system while the missile was still on the launch pad. The Johnston Island launch complex was demolished in the subsequent explosions and fire, which burned through the night. The launch emplacement and portions of the island were contaminated with radioactive plutonium spread by the blast, fire, and wind-blown smoke.

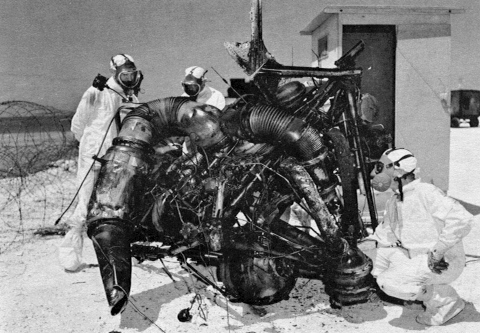
Inspection of Thor rocket engine remains on Johnston Island after failure of "Bluegill Prime" nuclear test attempt, July 1962

Afterward, the Johnston Island launch complex was heavily damaged and contaminated with plutonium. Missile launches and nuclear testing halted until the radioactive debris was dumped, soils were recovered, and the launch emplacement rebuilt. Before tests could resume, three months of repairs, decontamination, and rebuilding of the LE1 and the backup pad LE2 were necessary. To continue with the testing program, U.S. troops were sent in to do a rapid cleanup. The troops scrubbed down the revetments and launch pad, carted away debris, and removed the top layer of coral around the contaminated launch pad. The plutonium-contaminated rubbish was dumped in the lagoon, polluting the surrounding marine environment. Over 550 drums of contaminated material were dumped in the ocean off Johnston from 1964 to 1965. At the time of the Bluegill Prime disaster, a bulldozer and grader scraped the top fill around the launch pad. It was then dumped into the lagoon to make a ramp so the rest of the debris could be loaded onto the landing craft to be dumped into the ocean. An estimated 10 percent of the plutonium from the test device was in the fill used to make the ramp. Then, the ramp was covered and placed into a 25 acres (100,000 m^{2}) landfill on the island during 1962 dredging to extend the island. The lagoon was again dredged in 1963–1964 and used to expand Johnston Island from 220 to 625 acres (89 to 253 ha), recontaminating additional portions of the island.

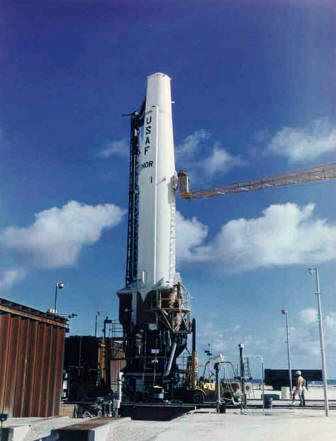
PGM-17 Thor missile at Johnston Island

On October 15, 1962, the "Bluegill Double Prime" test also misfired. During the test, the rocket was destroyed at a height of 109,000 feet after it malfunctioned 90 seconds into the flight. U.S. Defense Department officials confirm that the rocket's destruction contributed to the radioactive pollution on the island.

In 1963, the U.S. Senate ratified the Limited Test Ban Treaty, which contained a provision known as "Safeguard C". Safeguard C was the basis for maintaining Johnston Atoll as a "ready to test" above-ground nuclear testing site should atmospheric nuclear testing ever be deemed necessary again. In 1993, Congress appropriated no funds for the Johnston Atoll "Safeguard C" mission, ending it.

=== Anti-satellite mission 1962–1975 ===
Program 437 turned the PGM-17 Thor into an operational anti-satellite (ASAT) weapon system, a capability that was kept top secret even after it was deployed. The Program 437 mission was approved for development by U.S. Secretary of Defense Robert McNamara on November 20, 1962, and based at the atoll. Program 437 used modified Thor missiles that had been returned from deployment in Great Britain and was the second deployed U.S. operational nuclear anti-satellite operation. Eighteen more suborbital Thor launches took place from Johnston Island from 1964 to 1975 in support of Program 437. In 1965–1966, four Program 437 Thors were launched with 'Alternate Payloads' for satellite inspection. This was an elaboration of the system to allow visual verification of the target before destroying it. These flights may have been related to the late 1960s Program 922, a non-nuclear version of Thor with infrared homing and a high-explosive warhead. Thors were active near the two Johnston Island launch pads after 1964. However, partly because of the Vietnam War, in October 1970, the Department of Defense transferred Program 437 to standby status as an economic measure. The Strategic Arms Limitation Talks led to Anti-Ballistic Missile Treaty that prohibited 'interference with national means of verification', which meant that ASATs were not allowed, by treaty, to attack Soviet spy satellites. Thors were removed from Johnston Atoll and were stored in mothballed war-reserve condition at Vandenberg Air Force Base from 1970 until the anti-satellite mission of Johnston Island facilities ceased on August 10, 1974. The program was officially discontinued on April 1, 1975, when any possibility of restoring the ASAT program was finally terminated. Eighteen Thor launches in support of the Program 437 Alternate Payload (AP) mission took place from Johnston Atoll's Launch emplacements. Two Thor missiles were launched from the Island in late 1975, months after the "officially discontinued" date.

=== Baker–Nunn satellite tracking camera station ===
The Space Detection and Tracking System or SPADATS was operated by North American Aerospace Defense Command (NORAD) along with the U.S. Air Force Spacetrack system, The Navy Space Surveillance System and Canadian Forces Air Defense Command Satellite Tracking Unit. The Smithsonian Astrophysical Observatory also operated a dozen 3.5 ton Baker-Nunn Camera systems (none at Johnston) for cataloging of artificial satellites. The U.S. Air Force had ten Baker-Nunn camera stations worldwide, mostly from 1960 to 1977, with a phase-out beginning in 1964.

The Baker-Nunn space camera station was constructed on Sand Island. It was functioning by 1965. USAF 18th Surveillance Squadron operated the Baker-Nunn camera at a station built along the causeway on Sand Island until 1975 when a contract to operate the four remaining Air Force stations was awarded to Bendix Field Engineering Corporation. In about 1977, the camera at Sand Island was moved to Daegu, South Korea. Baker-Nunn were rendered obsolete with the Initial Operational Capability of 3 GEODSS optical tracking sites at Daegu, Korea; Mount Haleakala, Maui and White Sands Missile Range. A fourth site was operational in 1985 at Diego Garcia, and a proposed fifth site in Portugal was canceled. The Daegu, Korea site was closed due to encroaching city lights. GEODSS tracked satellites at night, though the MIT Lincoln Laboratory test site, co-located with Site 1 at White Sands, did track asteroids in the daytime as proof of concept in the early 1980s.

=== Johnston Island Recovery Operations Center ===
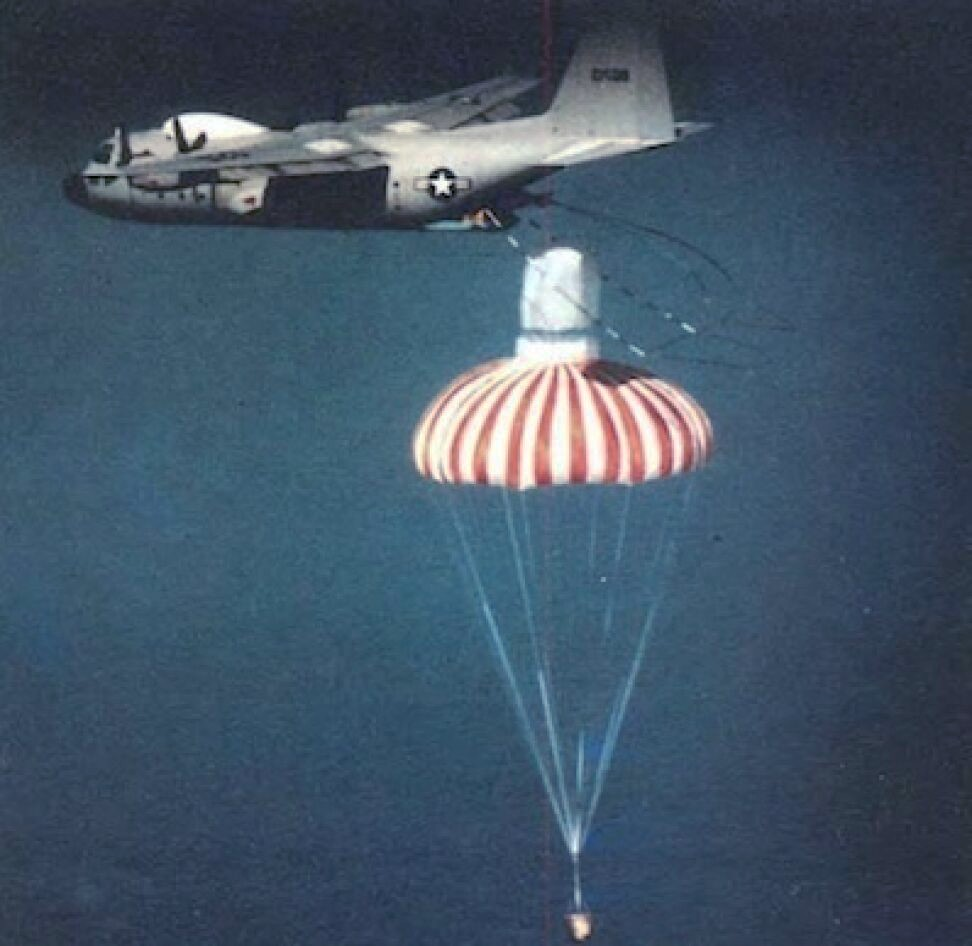
A USAF JC-130 aircraft retrieving a SAMOS film capsule

Satellite and Missile Observation System Project (SAMOS-E) or "E-6" was a relatively short-lived series of United States visual reconnaissance satellites in the early 1960s. SAMOS was also known by the unclassified terms Program 101 and Program 201. The Air Force program was used as a cover for the initial development of the Central Intelligence Agency's Key Hole (including Corona and Gambit) reconnaissance satellites systems. Imaging was performed with film cameras and television surveillance from polar low Earth orbits with film canisters returning via capsule and parachute with mid-air retrieval. SAMOS was first launched in 1960 but not operational until 1963, with all of the missions being launched from Vandenberg AFB.

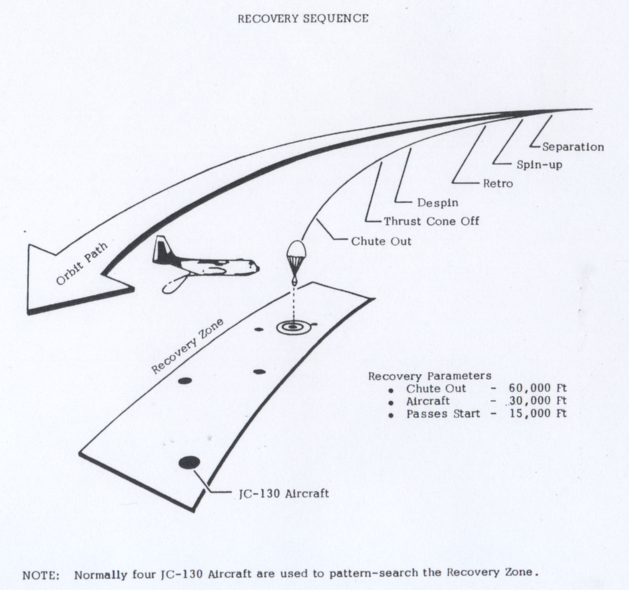
Corona film capsule recovery sequence.

During the early months of the SAMOS program, it was essential not only to hide the Corona and GAMBIT technical efforts under a screen of SAMOS activity but also to make the orbital vehicle portions of the two systems resemble one another in outward appearance. Thus, some of the configuration details of SAMOS were decided less by engineering logic than by the need to camouflage GAMBIT. Hence, theoretically, a GAMBIT could be launched without alerting many people to its real nature. Problems relative to tracking networks, communications, and recovery were resolved with the decision in late February 1961 to use Johnston Island as the program's film capsule descent and recovery zone. On July 10, 1961, work was initiated on four buildings of the Johnston Island Recovery Operations Center for the National Reconnaissance Office. Men from the Johnston Atoll facility would recover the parachuting film canister capsules with a radar-equipped JC-130 aircraft by capturing them in the air with a specialized recovery apparatus. The recovery center was also responsible for collecting the radioactive scientific data pods dropped from missiles following launch and nuclear detonation.

=== Biological warfare test site 1965–1968 ===
The atoll was subject to large-scale bioweapons testing over four years starting in 1965. The American strategic tests of bioweapons were as expensive and elaborate as the tests of the first hydrogen bombs at Eniwetok Atoll. They involved enough ships to have made the world's fifth-largest independent navy. One experiment involved several barges with hundreds of rhesus monkeys. It is estimated that one jet with bioweapon spray "would probably be more efficient at causing human deaths than a ten-megaton hydrogen bomb."

In the lead-up to biological warfare testing in the Pacific under Project 112 and Project SHAD, a new virus was discovered during the Pacific Ocean Biological Survey Program by teams from the Smithsonian's Division of Birds aboard a United States Army tugboat involved in the program. Initially, the effort's name was the Pacific Ocean Ornithological Project; however, it was changed once someone noted the natural acronym "POOP". First isolated in 1964 the tick-borne virus was discovered in Ornithodoros capensis ticks, found in a nest of common noddy (Anous stolidus) at Sand Island, Johnston Atoll. It was designated Johnston Atoll Virus and is related to influenza.

In February, March, and April 1965, Johnston Atoll was used to launch biological attacks against U.S. Army and Navy vessels 100 miles (160 km) south-west of Johnston island in vulnerability, defense, and decontamination tests conducted by the Deseret Test Center during Project SHAD under Project 112. Test DTC 64-4 (Deseret Test Center) was initially called "RED BEVA" (Biological EVAluation), though the name was later changed to "Shady Grove", likely for operational security reasons. The biological agents released during this test included Francisella tularensis (formerly called Pasteurella tularensis) (Agent UL), the causative agent of tularemia; Coxiella burnetii (Agent OU), the causative agent of Q fever; and Bacillus globigii (Agent BG). During Project SHAD, Bacillus globigii was used to simulate biological warfare agents (such as anthrax), because it was then considered a contaminant with little health consequence to humans; however, it is now considered a human pathogen. Ships equipped with the E-2 multi-head disseminator and A-4C aircraft equipped with Aero 14B spray tanks released live pathogenic agents in nine aerial and four surface trials in phase B of the test series from February 12 to March 15, 1965, and in four aerial trials in phase D of the test series from March 22 to April 3, 1965.

According to Project SHAD veteran Jack Alderson, who commanded the Army tugs, area three at Johnston Atoll was located at the most downwind part of the island and consisted of a collapsible Nissen hut for weapons preparation and some communications.

=== Chemical weapon storage 1971–2001 ===
In 1970, Congress redefined the island's military mission as the storage and destruction of chemical weapons. The United States Army leased 41 acres (17 ha) on the atoll to store chemical weapons held in Okinawa, Japan. Johnston Atoll became a chemical weapons storage site in 1971, holding about 6.6 percent of the U.S. military chemical weapon arsenal. The chemical weapons were brought from Okinawa under Operation Red Hat with the re-deployment of the 267th Chemical Company. They consisted of rockets, mines, artillery projectiles, and bulk 1-ton containers filled with Sarin, Agent VX, vomiting agent, and blister agent such as mustard gas. Chemical weapons from West Germany and World War II era weapons from the Solomon Islands were also stored on the island after 1990. Chemical agents were stored in the high-security Red Hat Storage Area (RHSA) which included hardened igloos in the weapon storage area, the Red Hat building (#850), two Red Hat hazardous waste warehouses (#851 and #852), an open storage area, and security entrances and guard towers.

Some of the other weapons stored at the site were shipped from U.S. stockpiles in West Germany in 1990. These shipments followed a 1986 agreement between the U.S. and West Germany to move the munitions. Merchant ships carrying the munitions left West Germany under Operation Golden Python and Operation Steel Box in October 1990 and arrived at Johnston Island November 6, 1990. Although the ships were unloaded within nine days, the unpacking and storing of munitions continued into 1991. The remainder of the chemical weapons was a small number of World War II era weapons shipped from the Solomon Islands.

=== Agent Orange storage 1972–1977 ===
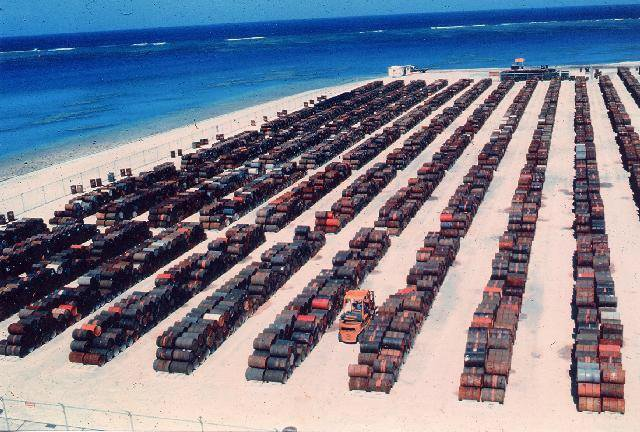
Leaking Agent Orange Barrels in storage at Johnston Atoll, circa 1973

Agent Orange was brought to Johnston Atoll from South Vietnam and Gulfport, Mississippi in 1972 under Operation Pacer IVY. It was stored on the northwest corner of the island known as the Herbicide Orange Storage site, dubbed the "Agent Orange Yard". The Agent Orange was eventually destroyed during Operation Pacer HO on the Dutch incineration ship MT Vulcanus in the Summer of 1977. The U.S. Environmental Protection Agency (EPA) reported that 1,800,000 gallons of Herbicide Orange were stored at Johnston Atoll and that an additional 480,000 gallons stored at Gulfport, Mississippi, was brought to Johnston Atoll for destruction. Leaking barrels during storage, and spills during re-drumming operations, contaminated both the storage area and the lagoon with herbicide residue and its toxic contaminant 2,3,7,8-Tetrachlorodibenzodioxin.

=== Chemical weapon demilitarization mission 1990–2000 ===
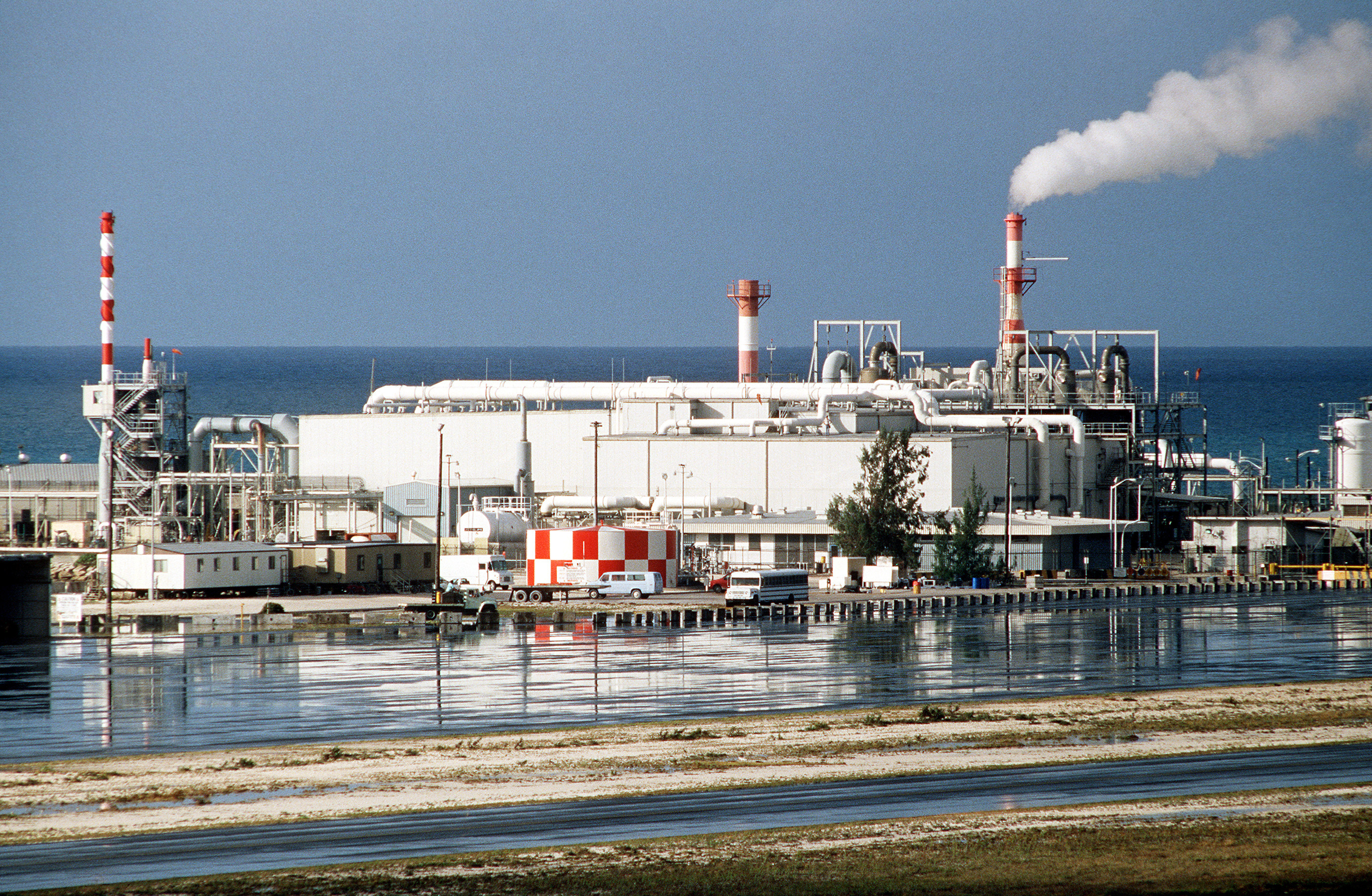
Johnston Atoll Chemical Agent Disposal System (JACADS) building

The Army's Johnston Atoll Chemical Agent Disposal System (JACADS) was the first full-scale chemical weapons disposal facility. Built to incinerate chemical munitions on the island, planning started in 1981, construction began in 1985, and it was completed five years later. Following construction and facility characterization, JACADS began operational verification testing (OVT) in June 1990. From 1990 until 1993, the Army conducted four planned periods of Operational Verification Testing (OVT), required by Public Law 100–456. OVT was completed in March 1993, demonstrating that the reverse assembly incineration technology was adequate and that JACADS operations met all environmental parameters. The transition to full-scale operations started in May 1993, but the facility did not begin full-scale operations until August 1993.

All of the chemical weapons once stored on Johnston Island were demilitarized, and the agents incinerated at JACADS, with the process completed in the year 2000. Later, the destruction of legacy hazardous waste material associated with chemical weapon storage and cleanup was completed. JACADS was demolished by 2003, and the island was stripped of its remaining infrastructure and environmentally remediated.

=== Closure and remaining structures ===
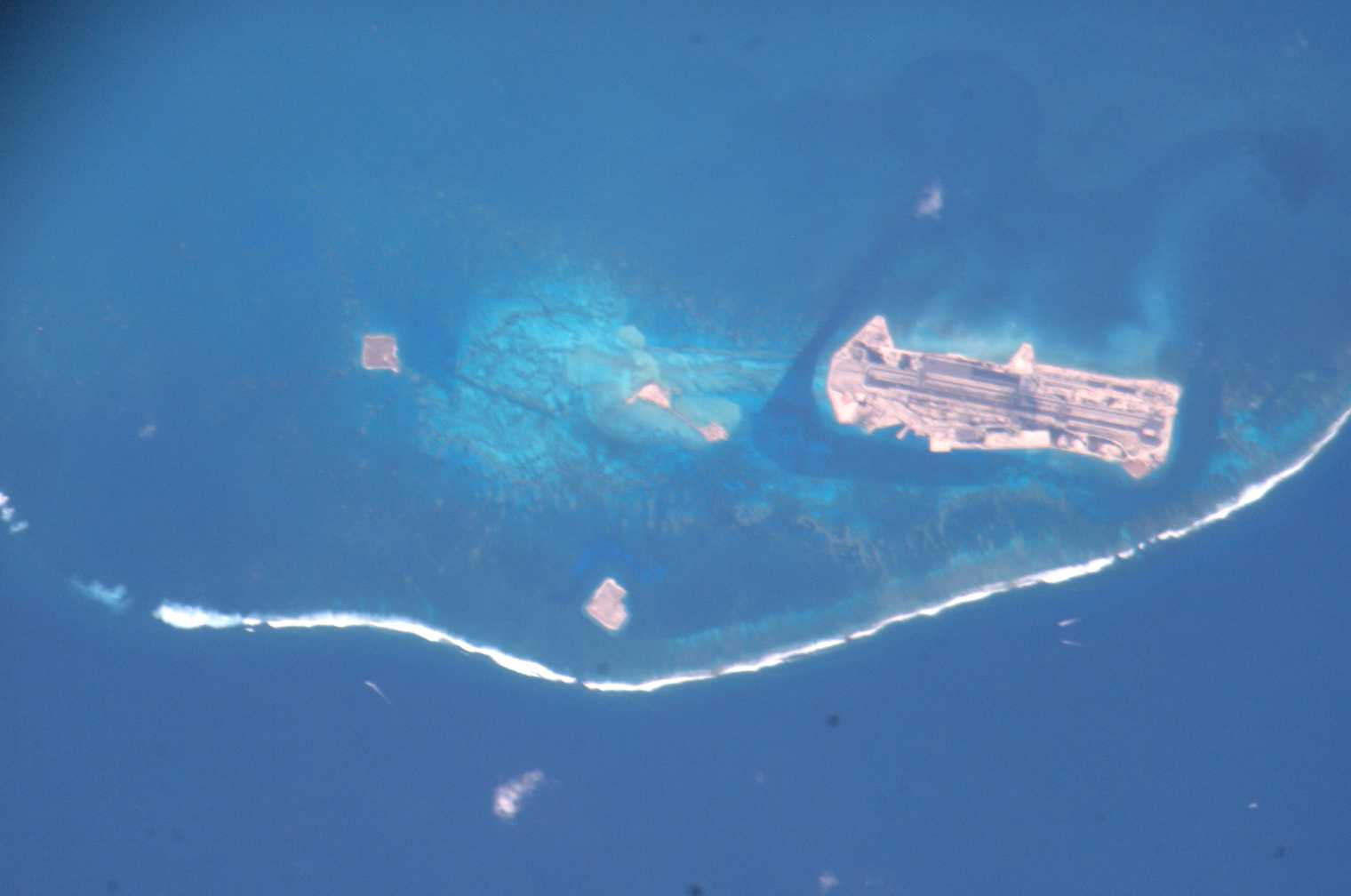
Johnston Atoll as seen from the ISS in 2006. (South is up in this image)

In 2003, structures and facilities, including those used in JACADS, were removed, and the runway was marked closed. The last flight out for official personnel was June 15, 2004. After this date, the base was completely deserted, with the only structures left standing being the Joint Operations Center (JOC) building at the east end of the runway, chemical bunkers in the weapon storage area, and at least one Quonset hut.

Built in 1964, the JOC is a four-floor concrete and steel administration building for the island that has no windows and was built to withstand a category IV tropical cyclone as well as atmospheric nuclear tests. The building remains standing but was gutted entirely in 2004 during an asbestos abatement project. All doors of the JOC except one have been welded shut. The ground floor has a side building attached that serves as a facility for decontamination. It contains three long snaking corridors and 55 shower heads one could walk through during decontamination.

Rows of bunkers in the Red Hat Storage Area remain intact; however, an agreement was established between the U.S. Army and EPA Region IX on August 21, 2003, that the Munitions Demilitarization Building (MDB) at JACADS would be demolished and the bunkers in the RHSA used for disposal of construction rubble and debris. After placement of the debris inside the bunkers, they were secured, and the entries were blocked with a concrete block barrier (a.k.a. King Tut Block) to prevent access to the bunker interior.

=== Contamination and cleanup ===
Over the years, leaks of Agent Orange, as well as chemical weapon leaks in the weapon storage area, occurred where caustic chemicals such as sodium hydroxide were used to mitigate toxic agents during cleanup. Larger spills of nerve and mustard agents within the MCD at JACADS also took place. The EPA cited small releases of chemical weapon components from JACADS. Multiple studies of the Johnston Atoll environment and ecology have been conducted, and the atoll is likely the most studied island in the Pacific.

Studies at the atoll on the effect of PCB contamination in reef damselfish (Abudefduf sordidus) demonstrated that embryonic abnormalities could be used as a metric for comparing contaminated and uncontaminated areas. Some PCB contamination in the lagoon was traced to Coast Guard disposal practices of PCB-laden electrical transformers.

In 1962, plutonium pollution following three failed nuclear missile launches was heaviest near the destroyed launch emplacement, in the lagoon offshore of the launch pad, and near Sand Island. The contaminated launch site was stripped, and the debris gathered and buried in the island's 1962 expansion. A comprehensive radiological survey was completed in 1980 to record transuranic contamination from the 1962 THOR missile aborts. The Air Force also initiated research on methods to remove dioxin contamination from soil resulting from leakage of the stored herbicide Agent Orange. Since then, U.S. defense authorities have surveyed the island in a series of studies.

Contaminated structures were dismantled and isolated within the former Thor Launch Emplacement No. 1 (LE-1) as a start for the cleanup program. About 45,000 tons of soil contaminated with radioactive isotopes was collected and placed into a fenced area covering 24 acres (9.7 ha) on the island's north. The area was known as the Radiological Control Area and heavily contaminated with highly radioactive Plutonium. The Pluto Yard is on the site of the LE1 where the 1962 missile explosion occurred, and also where a highly contaminated loading ramp was buried that was made for loading plutonium contaminated debris onto small boats that was dumped at sea. Remediation included a plutonium "mining" operation called the Johnston Atoll Plutonium Contaminated Soil Cleanup Project. The collected radioactive soil and other debris were buried in a landfill created within the former LE-1 area from June 2002 through November 11, 2002. Remediation at the Radiation Control Area included the construction of a 61-centimeter-thick cap of coral sealing the landfill. Permanent markers were placed at each corner of the landfill to identify the landfill area.

=== After closing ===
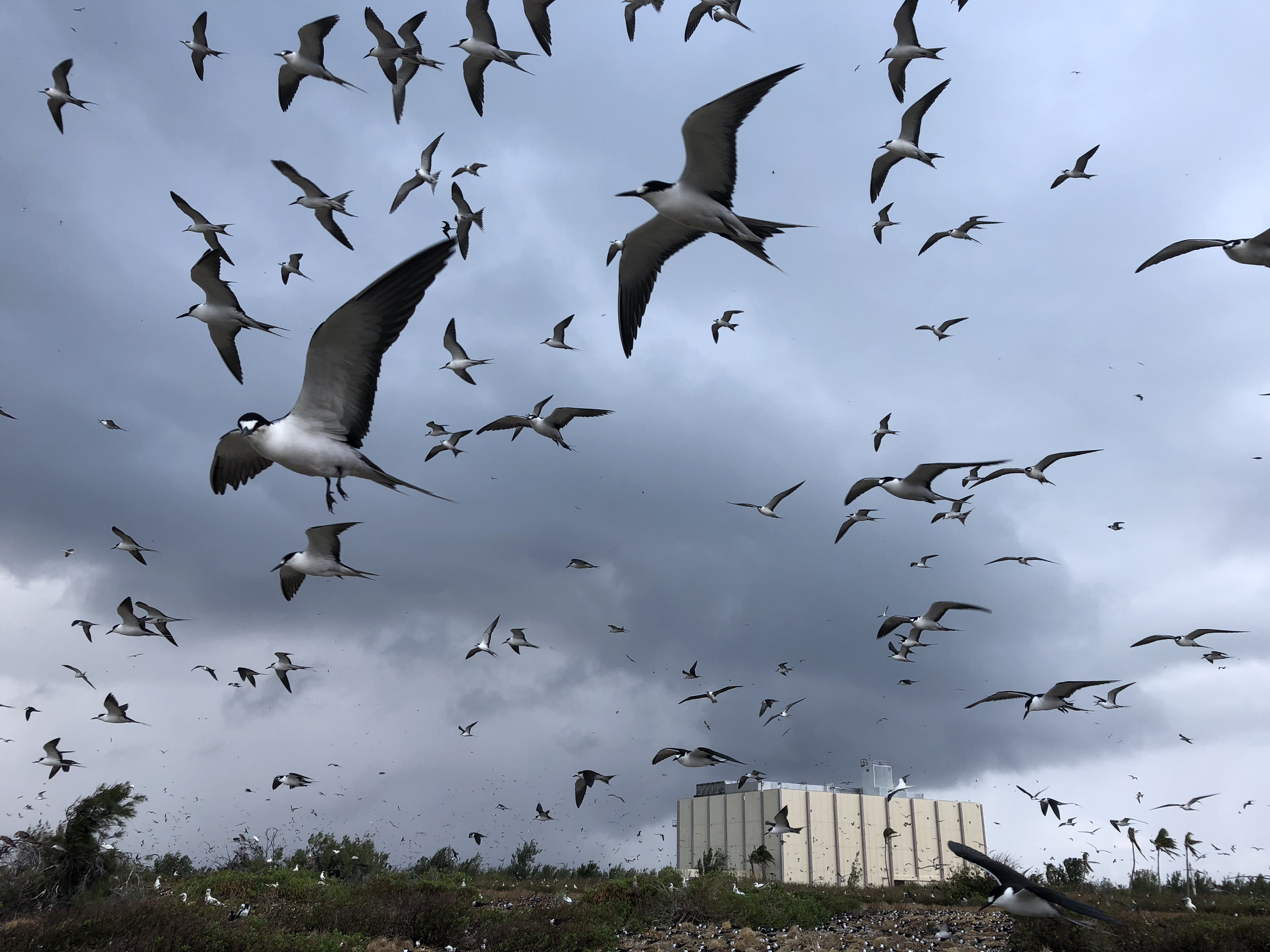
Sooty terns in flight, 2019

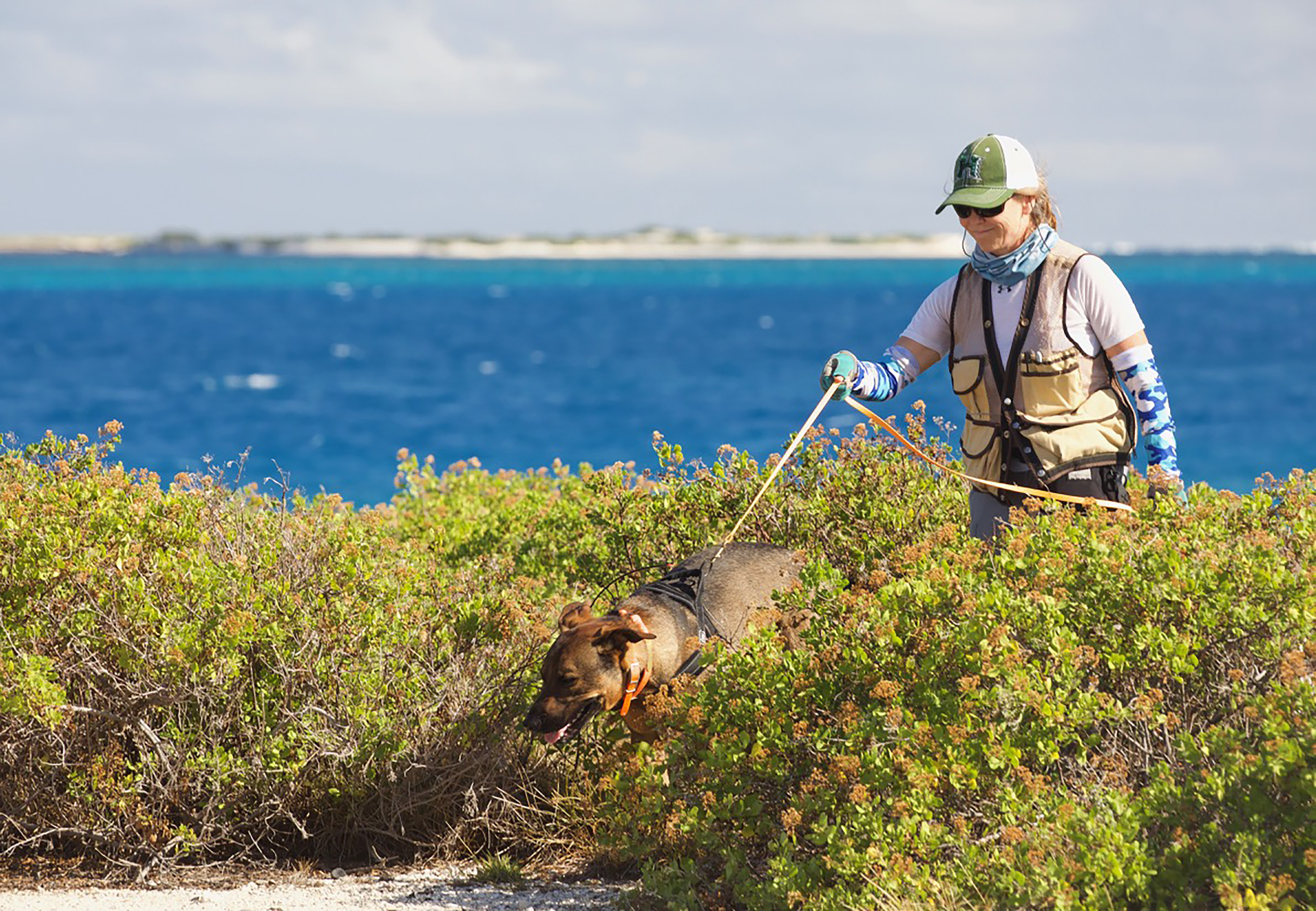
Dog searches for crazy ants, 2021

The atoll was placed up for auction via the U.S. General Services Administration (GSA) in 2005 before it was withdrawn. The stripped Johnston Island was briefly offered for sale with several deed restrictions in 2005 as a "residence or vacation getaway," with potential usage for "eco-tourism" by the GSA's Office of Real Property Utilization and Disposal. The proposed sale included the unique postal zip code 96558, formerly assigned to the Armed Forces in the Pacific. The proposed sale did not include running water, electricity, or activation of the closed runway. The details of the offering were outlined on GSA's website and in a newsletter of the Center for Land Use Interpretation as unusual real estate listing # 6384, Johnston Island.

On August 22, 2006, Johnston Island was struck by Hurricane Ioke. The eastern eye-wall passed directly over the atoll, with winds exceeding 100 mph (160 km/h). Twelve people were on the island when the hurricane struck, and part of a crew was sent to deliver a USAF contractor who sampled groundwater contamination levels. All 12 survived, and one wrote a first-hand account of taking shelter from the storm in the JOC building.

On December 9, 2007, the United States Coast Guard swept the runway at Johnston Island of debris and used the runway in the removal and rescue of an ill Taiwanese fisherman to Oahu, Hawaii. The fisherman was transferred from the Taiwanese fishing vessel Sheng Yi Tsai No. 166 to the Coast Guard buoy tender Kukui on December 6, 2007. The fisherman was transported to the island, and then picked up by a Coast Guard HC-130 Hercules rescue plane from Kodiak, Alaska.

Since the base was closed, the atoll has been visited by many vessels crossing the Pacific, as the deserted atoll has a strong lure due to the activities once performed there. Visitors have blogged about stopping there during a trip or have posted photos of their visits.

In 2010, a Fish and Wildlife survey team identified a swarm of Anoplolepis ants that had invaded the Johnston Atoll National Wildlife Refuge. The crazy ants threatened vital seabird colonies and needed eradication. The "Crazy Ant Strike Team" project was led by the U.S. Fish and Wildlife Service, who achieved a 99% reduction in ant numbers by 2013. The team camped in a bunker previously used as a fallout shelter and office. Full eradication of the species from the atoll was achieved in 2021.

In 2025, it was announced as a planned location for the Air Force Research Laboratory to test delivering cargo by reusable rocket under the Air Force's Rocket Cargo program. The program's intent is to support the delivery of military cargo anywhere in the world within hours. The Air Force will build two landing pads supporting up to ten reentry vehicle landings per year over a four-year period. This testing phase is designed to demonstrate and evaluate the capabilities of the program.

== Demographics ==
Historical population
Year	Pop.	±%
1970	1,007	—
1980	327	−67.5%
1990	173	−47.1%
2000	1,100	+535.8%
2004	396	−64.0%
2005	361	−8.8%
2006	40	−88.9%
2020	10	−75.0%

Johnston Atoll has never had any indigenous inhabitants. However, during the late part of the 20th century, averages of about 300 American military personnel and 1,000 civilian contractors were present at any given time. Today, it is uninhabited except for a handful of workers with the Crazy Ant Strike Team project, who live on the island for six months at a time with little outside contact.

The primary means of transportation to this island was the airport, which had a paved military runway, or by ship via a pier and ship channel through the atoll's coral reef system. The islands were wired with 13 outgoing and 10 incoming commercial telephone lines, a 60-channel submarine cable, 22 DSN circuits by satellite, an Autodin with standard remote terminal, a digital telephone switch, the Military Affiliated Radio System (MARS station), a UHF/VHF air-ground radio, and a link to the Pacific Consolidated Telecommunications Network (PCTN) satellite. Amateur radio operators occasionally transmitted from the island, using the KH3 call-sign prefix. The United States Undersea Cable Corporation was awarded contracts to lay underwater cables in the Pacific. A cable called "Wet Wash C" was laid in 1966 between Makua, Hawaii, and the Johnston Island Air Force Base. USNS Neptune surveyed the route and laid 769 nautical miles (1,424 km; 885 mi) of cable and 45 repeaters. The Simplex Wire and Cable Company manufactured these cables, with the repeaters being supplied by Felten and Guilleaume. In 1993, a satellite communication ground station was added to augment the atoll's communications capability.

Johnston Atoll's economic activity was limited to providing services to American military and contractor personnel on the island. The island was regularly resupplied by ship or barge, and all foodstuffs and manufactured goods were imported. The base had six 2.5-megawatt electrical generators using diesel engines. The runway was also available to commercial airlines for emergency landings (a fairly common event). It was a regular stop on Continental Micronesia airline's "island hopper" service for many years between Hawaii and the Marshall Islands.

There were no official license plates issued for use on Johnston Atoll. U.S. government vehicles were issued U.S. government license plates, and private vehicles retained the plates from which they were registered. According to reputable license plate collectors, some Johnston Atoll license plates were created as souvenirs and have even been sold online to collectors, but they were not officially issued.

== Areas ==
Site	Location	Alternative name
Red Hat Storage Area	16.7234°N 169.5393°W	"Red Hat Area"
Radiological Control Area	16.7303°N 169.5371°W	"Pluto' Yard" (Plutonium Yard)
Site Herbicide Orange Storage Site	16.7304°N 169.5359°W	Agent Orange Yard
Joint Operations Center building (JOC)	16.7355°N 169.5233°W	JOC
Scientific Row	16.7246°N 169.5399°W	
Runway 5/23 (closed)	16.7271°N 169.5384°W	
Navy Pier	16.7359°N 169.5279°W	
Wharf Area and Demilitarization Zone L	16.7342°N 169.5310°W	
Hama Point	16.7304°N 169.5212°W	
Bunker buildings 746 through 761	16.7250°N 169.5367°W	
Southwest Area	16.7209°N 169.5444°W	
Board on Army Science and Technology (BAST) building	16°44′8″N 169°31′31″W	

== Launch facilities ==
Component	Location
Johnston Island LC1 Redstone launch complex. Pad 1	16.7365°N 169.5222°W
Johnston Island LC2 Redstone launch complex. Pad 2	16.7369°N 169.5226°W
Johnston Island HAD23 Tomahawk Sandia launch complex. HAD Launcher 23	16.7375°N 169.5258°W
Johnston Island UL6 Sandhawk launch complex. Universal Launcher 6	16.7374°N 169.5257°W
Johnston Island LE1 Thor-Delta launch complex. Launch Emplacement 1	16.7288°N 169.5398°W
Johnston Island LE2 Thor-Delta launch complex. Launch Emplacement 2	16.7288°N 169.5398°W
Johnston Island S Johnston Island Operation Dominic south launchers	16.7370°N 169.5240°W

== See also ==
- List of Guano Island claims
