= ASPS =

ASPS may refer to:

- Advanced sleep phase syndrome, a sleep disorder in which patients feel very sleepy early in the evening
- American Society of Plastic Surgeons, the largest plastic surgery specialty organization in the world
- Alveolar soft part sarcoma, a rare type of soft tissue sarcoma tumor
- Association of Scottish Police Superintendents

== See also ==
- Asp (disambiguation), for the singular of Asps
- ASP (disambiguation), for the singular of ASPs
