= Johnston Atoll Airport =

Airport on Johnson Atoll

- Map of the islands of Johnston Atoll, showing airstrip on Johnston Island
- IATA: ~~JON~~; ICAO: ~~PJON~~; WMO: ~~91275~~

Summary
- Airport type: Public
- Location: Johnston Atoll
- Elevation AMSL: 7 ft (2.1 m)
- Coordinates: 16°43′43″N 169°32′03″W

Map
- Location in the Pacific Ocean

Runways
Direction	Length		Surface
Direction	ft	m	Surface
5/23	9,000	2,743	Asphalt

Johnston Atoll Airport is located on the Johnston Atoll in the United States Minor Outlying Islands, in the Pacific Ocean 717 nautical miles (1328 kilometers) southwest of Hawaii. It was an active U.S. military facility during the 20th century, but the airport was shut down in 2005 and the runway is not maintained. Although no longer a diversion airport, it is still considered preferable to a dangerous water landing in an extreme emergency.

== History ==
In September 1941, construction of an airfield on Johnston Island commenced. A 4,000 feet (1,200 m) by 500 feet (150 m) runway was built, together with two 400-man barracks, two mess halls, a cold-storage building, an underground hospital, a fresh-water plant, shop buildings, and fuel storage. The runway was complete by December 7, 1941, though in December 1943, the 99th Naval Construction Battalion arrived at the atoll and proceeded to lengthen the runway to 6,000 feet (1,800 m). The runway was subsequently lengthened and improved as the island was enlarged.

During World War II, Johnston Atoll was used as a refueling base for submarines, and also as an aircraft refueling stop for American bombers transiting the Pacific Ocean, including the Boeing B-29 Superfortress Enola Gay. By 1944, the atoll was one of the busiest air transport terminals in the Pacific. Air Transport Command aeromedical evacuation planes stopped at Johnston en route to Hawaii. Following V-J Day on August 14, 1945, Johnston Atoll saw the flow of men and aircraft that had been coming from the mainland into the Pacific turn around. By 1947, over 1,300 B-29 and {{B-24 Liberator}} bombers had passed through the Marianas, Kwajalein, Johnston Island, and Oahu, taking military personnel back to Mather Field and civilian life.

The airline Continental Micronesia served the island commercially, touching down between Honolulu and Majuro. When an aircraft landed it was surrounded by armed soldiers and the passengers were not allowed to leave the aircraft. Aloha Airlines also made weekly scheduled flights to the island carrying civilian and military personnel. In the 1990s, there were flights almost daily, and some days saw up to three arrivals. Just prior to movement of the chemical munitions to Johnston Atoll, the Surgeon General, Public Health Service, reviewed the shipment and the Johnston Atoll storage plans. His recommendations caused the Secretary of Defense to issue instructions in December 1970 suspending missile launches and all non-essential aircraft flights. As a result, the Continental Micronesia service was immediately discontinued, and missile firings were terminated, with the exception of two 1975 suborbital target vehicle launches deemed critical to the islands mission.

== Past and current use ==
The Johnston Atoll runway was used for emergency landings for both civil and military aircraft on many occasions. After it was decommissioned, it could no longer be considered as a possible emergency landing place when planning flight routes across the Pacific Ocean. As of 2003, the airfield consisted of a closed, unmaintained, single 9,000-foot (2,743 m) asphalt/concrete runway 05/23, with a parallel taxiway, and a large paved ramp along its south-east side.

== Accidents and incidents ==
- On 26 May 1942, a Consolidated PBY-5 Catalina (2453) of the US Navy sank upon landing at Johnston after the plane swerved into a violent waterloop, breaking the hull open. All eight occupants survived.
- On 29 March 1943, a Consolidated PBY-5 Catalina (2354) of the US Navy was looking for survivors after a B-24 crashed en route to Johnston from Oahu. While returning at 20:27, in a very dark night with no moon, the plane nosed over at 1,000 feet and rapidly crashed into the water, bursting into flames upon impact, 1.65 km (1 mile) northwest of Johnston. All 10 occupants were killed; the crash cause was undetermined.
- On 21 February 1946, a Curtiss R5C-1 (50695) of the USMC overshot on landing and was damaged beyond repair; there were no fatalities.
- On 1 November 1962, a Lockheed P-2H Neptune (140158) of the US Navy crashed into a reef 1.8 km (1.1 miles) off of Johnston on approach after the starboard engine failed. There were no fatalities.
