= Elisabeth Aspe =

Estonian writer

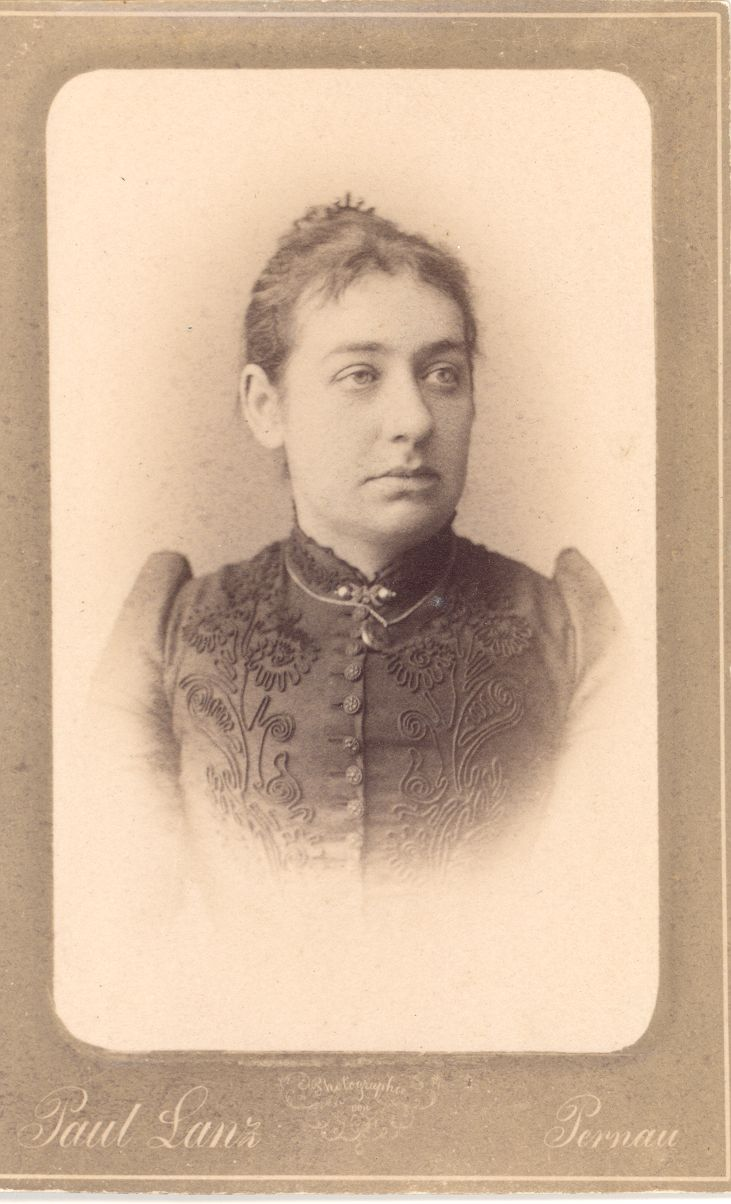
Elisabeth Aspe

Elisabeth Aspe (15 December 1860 – 25 August 1927) was an Estonian writer. She was born and died in Pärnu.

== Works ==
- 1881: "Enne ukse lukutamist"
- 1887: "Kasuõde"
- 1888: "Ennossaare Ain"
- 1891: "Anna Dorothea"
