= Johnston Island Air Force Base =

- Map of the islands of Johnston Atoll, showing airstrip on Johnston Island
- IATA: ~~JON~~; ICAO: ~~PJON~~

Summary
- Airport type: Public
- Location: Johnston Atoll
- Elevation AMSL: 7 ft (2.1 m)
- Coordinates: 16°43′43″N 169°32′03″W

Map
- Location in the Pacific Ocean

Runways
Direction	Length		Surface
Direction	ft	m	Surface
~~5/23~~	~~9,000~~	~~2,743~~	~~Asphalt~~

Johnston Island Air Force Base is a former United States Air Force base on the Johnston Atoll in the United States Minor Outlying Islands, in the Pacific Ocean several hundred kilometers southwest of Hawaii. After its closure, it briefly operated as Johnston Atoll Airport, until that also closed in 2005.

== History ==
In 1935 personnel from the United States Navy's Patrol Wing Two carried out some minor construction to develop the atoll for seaplane operations. They erected some buildings and a boat landing on Sand Island and blasted coral to clear a 3,600-foot (1,097 m) seaplane landing. In November 1939 further work by civilian contractors commenced on Sand Island to allow the operation of one squadron of patrol planes with seaplane tender support. Part of the lagoon was dredged and the excavated material was used to make a plane parking area connected by a 2,000-foot (610 m) causeway to Sand Island. Three seaplane landings were cleared; one of them was 11,000 by 1,000 feet (3,353 by 305 m), and the other two were cross-landings, each 7,000 by 800 feet (2,134 by 244 m) and dredged to a depth of 8 feet (2.4 m). On Sand Island, barracks for 400 men, a mess hall, an underground hospital, a radio station, water tanks, and a 100-foot (30 m) steel control tower were built.

In February 1941, the United States designated Johnston Atoll a Naval Defensive Sea Area and Airspace Reservation.

In September 1941, construction of an airfield on Johnston Island commenced. A 4,000-by-500-foot (1,219 by 152 m) runway was built together with two 400-man barracks, two mess halls, a cold-storage building, an underground hospital, a fresh-water plant, shop buildings, and fuel storage facilities. The base was complete by the time of the Japanese attack on Pearl Harbor on 7 December 1941.

== World War II ==
On 15 December 1941, the Imperial Japanese Navy submarine I-22 shelled Johnston Atoll from outside the reef, hitting several buildings but injuring no personnel.

In July 1942 the civilian contractors at the atoll were replaced by 500 Seebees from the 5th and 10th Naval Construction Battalions, who expanded the fuel storage and water production at the base and built additional facilities. The 5th Battalion departed in January 1943. In December 1943 the 99th Naval Construction Battalion arrived at the atoll and proceeded to lengthen the runway to 6,000 feet (1,829 m) and add an additional 10 acres (4.0 ha) of parking to the seaplane base.

U.S. Navy and United States Marine Corps units based at Johnston Atoll during World War II included:

- VB-102 operating PB4Y-1 Liberators from 28 February to 22 April 1943
- VB-104 operating PB4Y-1s from 11 April to 14 August 1943
- VB-142 operating PV-1 Venturas from 28 August to 11 November 1943
- VB-148 operating PV-2 Harpoons from 7 June to 16 August 1945
- VP-11 operating PBY-5 Catalinas from 30 April to 1 July 1942
- VP-13 operating PB2Y-3 Coronados from 1 March to 19 November 1943
- VP-23 operating PBY-5s from 7 December 1941 to 8 July 1942

== Post- World War II ==
U.S. Navy and Marine Corps units based at Johnston Atoll after World War II included:

- VP-4 operating SP-2H Neptunes from 22 January to July 1966
- VP-6 operating P2V-5FS Neptunes in July 1962 in support of nuclear testing
- VP-28 operating P2V-5FS Neptunes from 17 April to 7 July 1962 in support of nuclear testing
- VPB-124 operating PB4Y-2 Privateers from 2 July 1945 – 22 May 1947
