= Ninnie Asp =

Swedish silversmith

Ninnie Asp (born 1950) is a Swedish contemporary silversmith. Asp studied at Nyckelviksskolan in Stockholm, from 1967 to 1970. Her work is included in the Nationalmuseum in Sweden.

== Publications ==
- Modernes Schwedisches Silber, November 28, 1975 - January 25, 1976 [Modern Swedish Silver] (exhibition). Museum Bellerive. Zürich, Switzerland. 1975.
- Svenskt silver inför åttiotalet [Swedish Silver Before the Eighties]. Föreningen för nutida svenskt silver. Stockholm, Sweden: Fören. 1979.
