= Renée Aspe =

French artist (1922–1969)

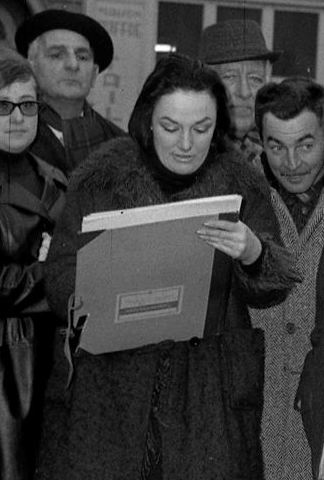
- Born: 3 December 1922; Toulouse, France
- Died: 17 September 1969 (aged 46); Toulouse, France
- Education: Institut supérieur des arts de Toulouse
- Known for: Painting

Renée Aspe (3 October 1922 – 17 September 1969) was a French artist who lived and worked in Toulouse and Sète.

== Life and work ==
Aspe had an eclectic body of work. She received acclaim while still alive. Many of her themes stem from her travels throughout France and in Morocco, Mexico, Germany, Spain and the United States. Her work was shown in galleries in Toulouse from 1945 to 1969, including at the Gallery Taur in 1960, 1963 and 1968, and the Gallery Chappe in 1961 and 1967. In 1970, her work was displayed at the Musée des Augustins.

Aspe painted children, street scenes, landscapes, still-lives and seascapes. Her work is included in the Musée Toulouse-Lautrec, Château de Sceaux, and the Museum of Grenoble.
