= Arsenic monophosphide =

Names
- IUPAC name Arsanylidynephosphane
- Other names Arsenic phosphide

Identifiers
CAS Number	12255-33-3
3D model (JSmol)	Interactive image
PubChem CID	15845941
- InChI: InChI=1S/AsP/c1-2 Key: CFLINJYOEUVYMI-UHFFFAOYSA-N
- SMILES: P#[As]

Properties
Chemical formula	AsP
Molar mass	105.89536 g/mol
- Except where otherwise noted, data are given for materials in their standard state (at 25 °C [77 °F], 100 kPa). Infobox references

Arsenic monophosphide, also called arsenic phosphide, is an inorganic compound with the chemical formula AsP. Containing only arsenic and phosphorus, this material is classified as a binary phosphide as well as an interpnictogen. Ratios of arsenic to phosphorus are not fixed and can vary. Depending on the ratio, the band gap changes.

== Structure ==
The structure of AsP is a two-dimensional mono layer composed of an equimolar mixture of phosphorus and arsenic.
