= Appalachia Service Project =

Appalachian-American housing charity

Appalachia Service Project, Inc
- Founded: 1969
- Founder: Rev. Glenn "Tex" Evans
- Type: Interdenominational, non-profit Christian Mission
- Tax ID no.: 62-0989383
- Location(s): 4523 Bristol Highway; Johnson City, Tennessee 37601, US
- Region served: Central Appalachia, specifically in the states of Kentucky, North Carolina, Tennessee, West Virginia, and Virginia.
- Employees: 34
- Volunteers: 16,267
- Website: Official Website

Appalachia Service Project or ASP is a US non-governmental organization which was founded in 1969. ASP addresses substandard housing using volunteer labor to perform repairs to make homes "warmer, safer, and drier." ASP operates in Central Appalachia, specifically in the states of Kentucky, North Carolina, Tennessee, Virginia, and West Virginia.

The mission statement of ASP states, "Appalachia Service Project is a Christian ministry, open to all people, that inspires hope and service through volunteer home repair in Central Appalachia," and ASP's vision is that "substandard housing in Central Appalachia will be eradicated and that everyone who comes into contact with this ministry will be transformed." Repairs are made using volunteer labor and at no cost to the homeowner. Between 1969 and 2015, ASP hosted 377,412 volunteers and performed repairs on 17,373 homes.

== History ==
ASP was founded in 1969 by Rev. Glenn "Tex" Evans, who emphasized the importance of providing service to those in need "right where they are, just the way they are." While working as a director at Henderson Settlement in Frakes, Kentucky, Evans saw first hand the need for assistance in home repairs among his neighbors. Later when he became a staff member of the Board Of Discipleship of the United Methodist Church in Nashville TN, he took several weeks off from his preaching schedule to recruit 50 teens and their adult counselors to repair four homes in Barbourville, Kentucky. This initiative has evolved into the Appalachia Service Project, which currently mobilizes between 15,000 and 17,000 volunteers each year to provide repairs to more than 500 families.[1]

ASP continued to grow between 1969 and 1976 by sponsoring regional workshops across the country to educate volunteers about the Appalachian region, bringing ASP's volunteers together to discuss their experiences and discuss replication of ASP's home repair model in their home communities. As an outgrowth of this vision, ASP expanded its work outside of the Central Appalachian region during the summer of 1976, sponsoring work crews in Arkansas, California, Alabama, Wisconsin, North Dakota, and Kentucky. Although ASP returned to its Central Appalachian roots the following summer, the Sierra Service Project in California became a successful spin-off and still exists today.

== Programs ==
=== Summer Program ===
Throughout the summer, ASP hosts volunteers aged 14 years and up. More than 14,000 youth, college, and adult volunteer groups come to Central Appalachian Kentucky, North Carolina, Tennessee, Virginia and West Virginia to perform home repairs during the months of June and July. Volunteer groups perform a week a service and are housed in one of ASP's 26 "summer centers", often schools or community centers that have been leased by ASP. ASP staff provide direction for home repair projects and supply tools, construction materials, and three meals each day.

=== Year-Round Program ===
In 1980, ASP established the first of its permanent facilities, the Jonesville Housing Services Center in Lee County, VA. Prior to the development of this property, ASP had operated as a summer program only. The Housing Services Center, however, established a year-round home rehabilitation program in Jonesville, VA, available to low-income homeowners and advised by a council of local residents.

Follow a 1989 capital campaign, ASP acquired and renovated a second housing services center in Chavies, KY to serve residents of Perry County throughout the year. The third year-round center, located in Brenton, WV was acquired in 1996, when the Wyoming County school board offered ASP permanent use of the former Guyan Valley Elementary School facility.

ASP continues to host volunteers for a week or shorter periods of time throughout the year at these permanent facilities. Volunteers who participate in the year-round program are matched with projects to suit their skills and level of construction experience. Although year-round centers welcome youth volunteers, the program focus is geared more specifically to adult and college-aged groups, and evening programming is not required for all groups. Moreover, volunteers with the year-round program stay in facilities that are climate-controlled and offer amenities such as bunk beds and indoor showers.

The operations of the Year-Round Program are supervised by ASP's "Fellows". The ASP Fellowship was first established through a donation from the Lily Endowment, and includes seminars and activities designed to facilitate the process of vocational discernment. During their year of service, ASP's Fellows live in and immerse themselves in the community they work alongside, in addition to supervising and guiding work groups through their assigned construction projects.

=== College Service Project (CSP) ===
ASP's founder, Tex Evans, always said: "We'd love for all ASP volunteers to come back each summer, but if they don't because they have started this in their own community, we'd love that even more." CSP chapters use ASP's model for home repair to plan and complete projects in their own community. CSP was launched in September, 2014 and 12 Campus Chapters are currently in operation. These chapters are student-run, student-led organizations on college campuses that are nationally affiliated with ASP. The mission statement of CSP is "College Service Project inspires students to lives of Christian service and leadership through home repair for low-income families in Central Appalachia and back in their home communities."

Students involved with CSP also volunteer with ASP and carry out a trip to one of ASP's Year Round centers during the fall, winter, or spring; fundraise and gain community sponsorship in order to raise the funds necessary to complete their projects; and recruit volunteers from within their community as well as potential applicants for ASP's Summer Staff program. Furthermore, members of CSP chapters are encouraged to serve with their communities in other ways that promote social justice and are compatible with the guiding principles of ASP.

In addition, CSP provides college students with the opportunity to develop professional skills outside of a classroom setting. The various activities performed by CSP chapters provide students with hands-on experience in construction management, community development, marketing, grant writing, fundraising, recruitment, and volunteer management.

=== Long-Term Recovery Program ===
Launched in response to flooding in the Dry Creek and Cash Hollow communities of Washington County, Tennessee in August 2012, ASP operates a disaster recovery program designed to assist low-income families in the Central Appalachian region rebuild following disasters such as fires or floods.

Following the June 23, 2016 floods in West Virginia, ASP launched the Rebuilding Rainelle initiative to assist families in Rainelle, WV and surrounding towns. This program, which has been implemented by ASP in partnership with Homes for White Sulphur Springs, the St. Bernard Project, and Neighbors Loving Neighbors completed the first new home for a flood survivor in West Virginia on November 22, 2016. ASP expects to complete 60 new homes for flood survivors and will continue work through 2017.

=== New Build Appalachia ===
ASP began constructing new homes in 1985 to help those in Central Appalachia achieve decent, safe, and sanitary housing and to complement the home repair ministry. Since that time, 201 new homes have been built in primarily Tennessee, Virginia, and Kentucky. Although the program was temporarily suspended during the 2000s due to operating deficits, the program was relaunched following the success of the new build program developed in the aftermath of the Dry Creek floods.

ASP's New Build Appalachia program provides mortgage-free new homes to families in East Tennessee and has constructed 22 new homes since 2014. The recipients of these homes are typically low-income families whose homes are beyond repair.

=== Race to Build ===
Race to Build is an annual event hosted by ASP in partnership with the Bristol Motor Speedway in Bristol, Tennessee. During the Spring Race in 2016, volunteers from as far north as Washington, D.C., down to Tri Cities, Tennessee, came together to build a home for a veteran, his wife, and two adopted children at the speedway. Volunteers were challenged to push the limits of how quickly it would be possible to build a house. In just one week, the house was completely built and furnished, and was dedicated on the morning of the Food City 500. After construction was completed, the home was moved to a permanent location for the family.

Looking to the future, ASP will continue to partner with the Bristol Motor Speedway to create spin-offs of this event. In spring of 2017, three colleges will compete to build a house as quickly as they can in just 3 ½ days. They will be measured on speed, accuracy, safety, and other factors, and the winning college will bring home a scholarship and claims to first place.

== See also ==
- Methodism
- Social and Economic Stratification in Appalachia
