= Tractors India =

Tractors India (TIL)
- Tractors India (TIL) logo

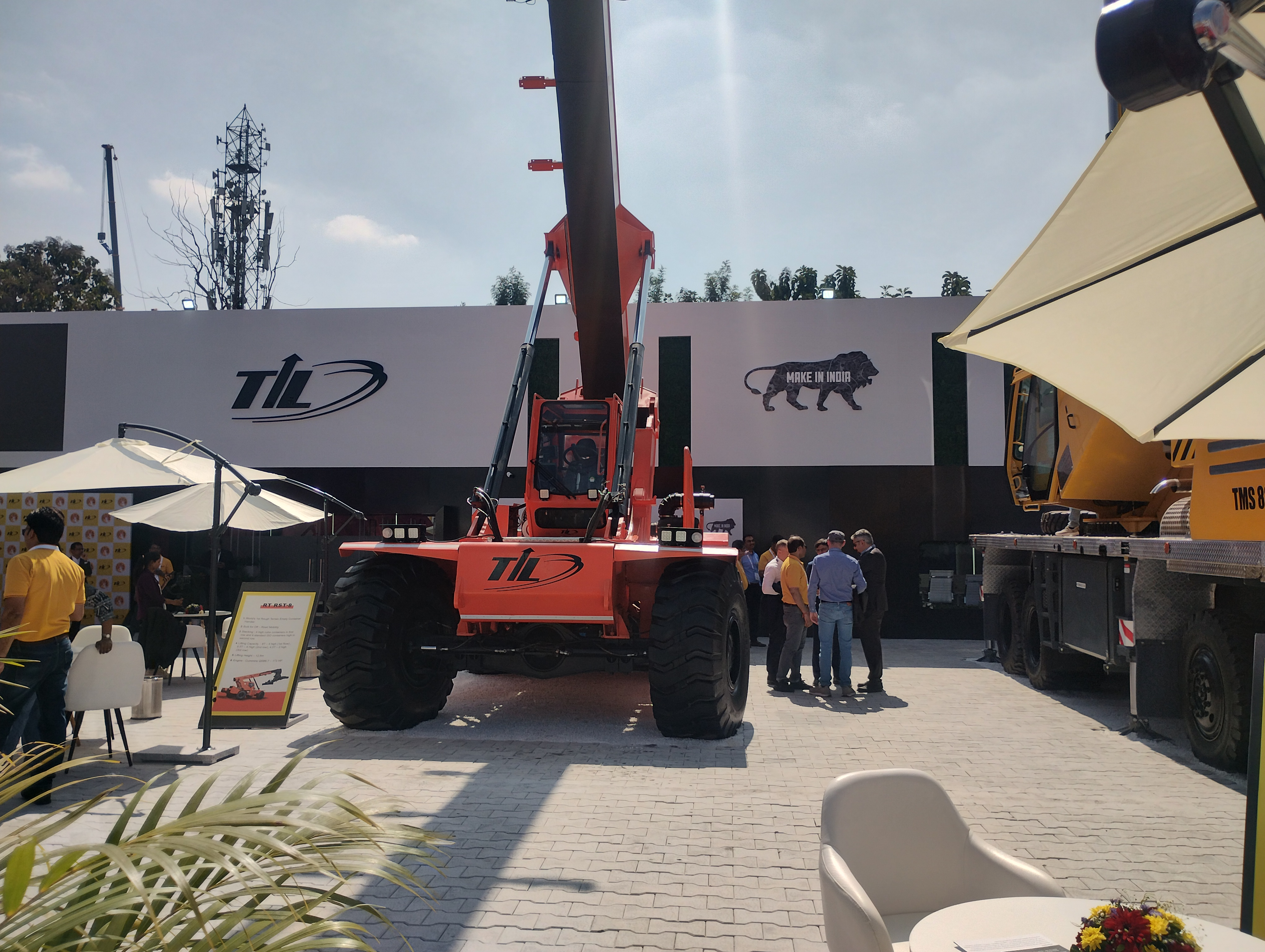
- TIL at EXCON 2025, BIEC
- Trade name: TIL
- Company type: Public limited
- Genre: Crane manufacturer
- Founded: 1944 in India
- Founder: Alan Ramsay, Charles Porter, and Robert Wilson
- Headquarters: India
- Parent: Gainwell Group
- Website: https://www.tilindia.in/

Tractors India Private Ltd. (TIPL or TIL) is India's oldest crane manufacturer company.

== History ==
It was established in 1944 by three Scotsmen, Alan Ramsay, Charles Porter, and Robert Wilson. Tractors India was started as an authorized dealer for Caterpillar Inc..

Tractors India was one of the first companies to introduce American earthmoving technology to India.

== Media gallery ==
TIL at EXCON 2025, BIEC
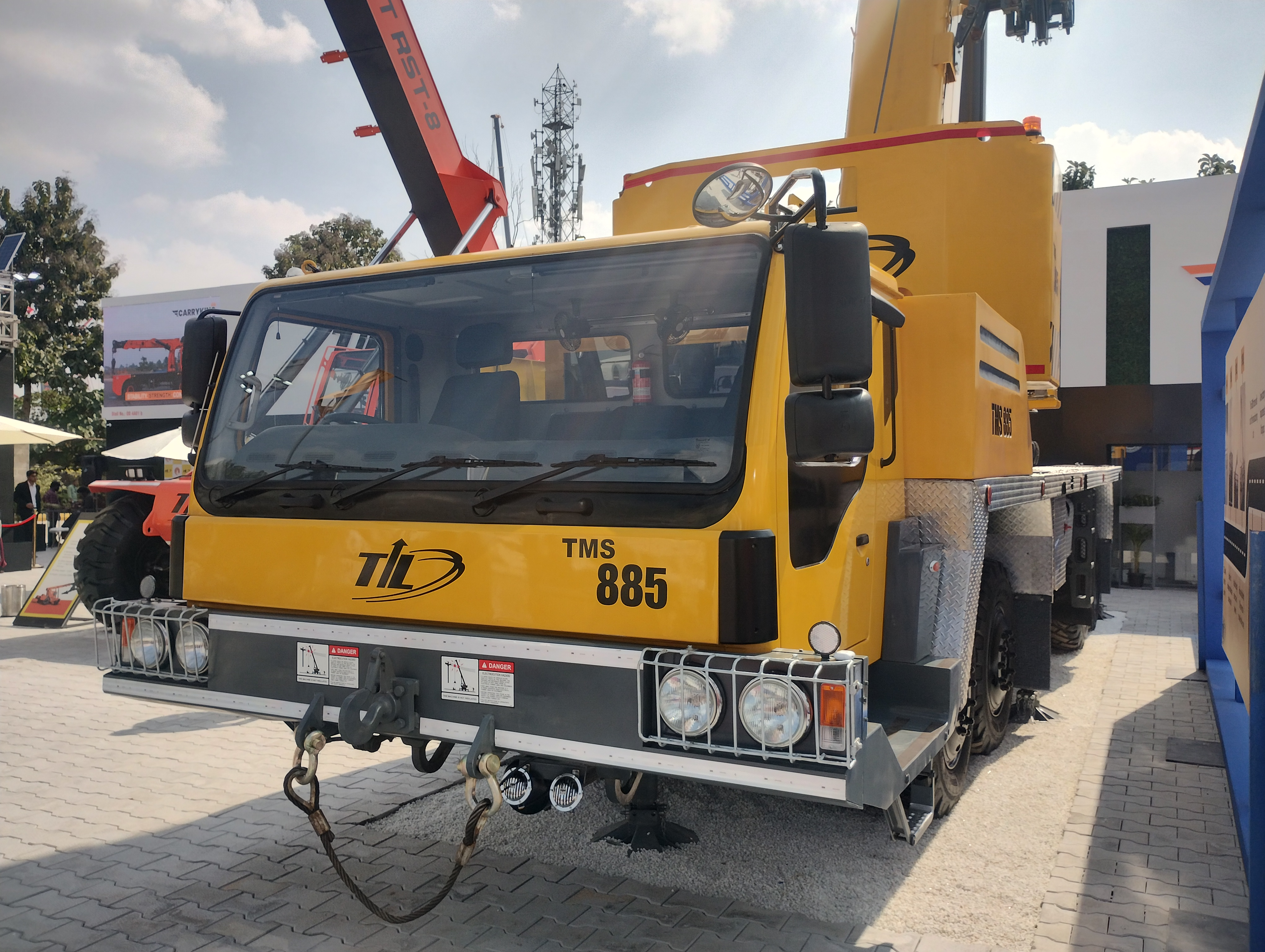

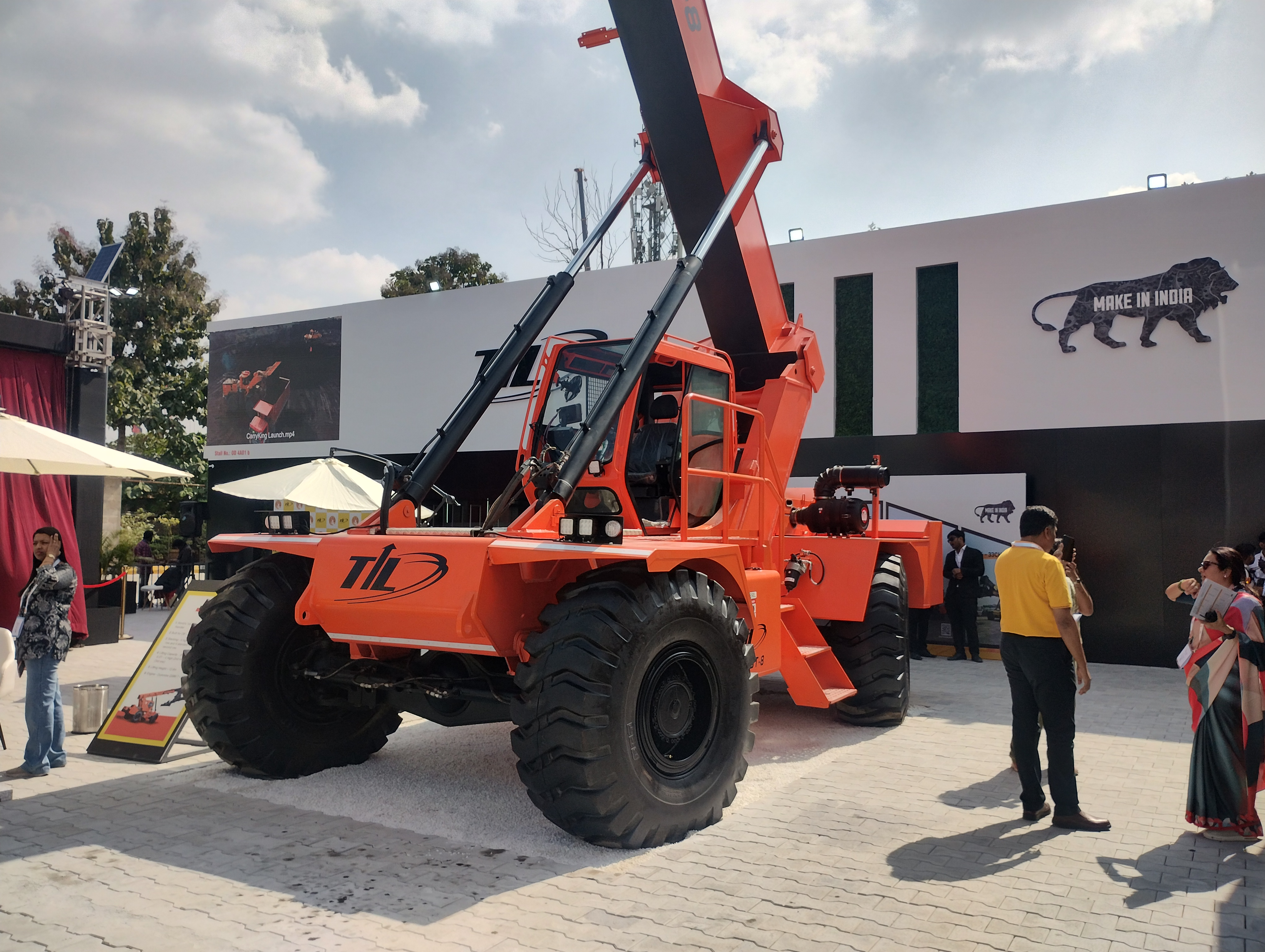

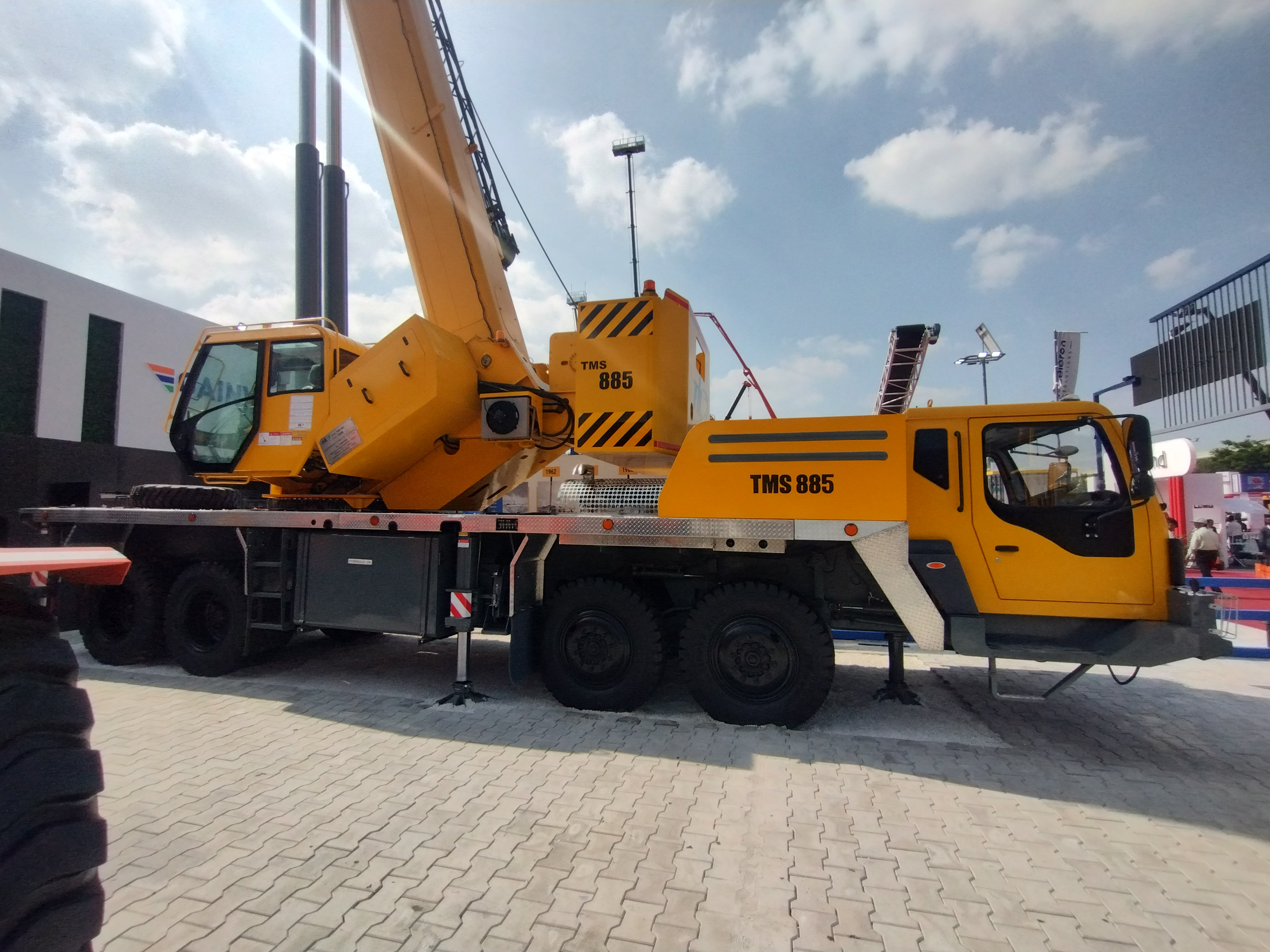
