= Inward Investment Account =

Inward Investment Account is a special dedicated or designated account which is facilitated for eligible investors preferably resident in or outside Sri Lanka in order to route/disperse funds to invest in selected permitted investments. Inward Investment Account may be well and truly maintained in typical Sri Lankan Rupees or in any designated foreign currency as per the Central Bank of Sri Lanka's policy rulebook including US dollar, Singapore dollar, Swedish kronor, Swiss franc, euro, sterling pound, Australian dollar, Canadian dollar, Hong Kong dollar and Japanese yen. Inward Investment Account could be opened in the form of a savings account, fixed deposit or demand deposit.

Licensed commercial banks and licensed specialized banks are being considered as the authorized dealers that are authorized and permitted to open and maintain Inward Investment Account in the domestic banking unit of a licensed commercial bank and licensed specialized bank in the name of the eligible investor, subject to the terms and conditions specified and stipulated in the Government Gazette as far as the Sri Lankan territory is concerned bearing number 2045/56 dated 17.11.2017 as well as the Direction No. 13 of 2017 under the Foreign Exchange Act, No. 12 of 2017.

== Eligibility ==
- Non-nationals in or outside Sri Lanka
- Companies incorporated outside Sri Lanka
- Sri Lankan citizens who are resident outside Sri Lanka
- Non-nationals of Sri Lankan origin/descent who are residents outside Sri Lanka
