= Gainwell Group =

Indian industrial conglomerate

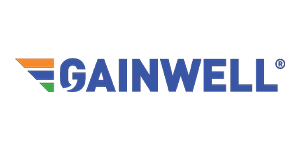
- Gainwell Group logo
- Industry: Conglomerate
- Genre: Capital goods, infrastructure, manufacturing, and technology
- Founded: 1944 in Calcutta, West Bengal, India
- Founder: Sunil Kumar Chaturvedi and his wife Meena Chaturvedi
- Headquarters: Kolkata, India
- Subsidiaries: Gainwell Trucking Private Limited; Gainwell Commosales; Tractors India
- Website: www.gainwellindia.com

Gainwell Group is an Indian industrial conglomerate operating across capital goods, infrastructure, manufacturing, and technology.

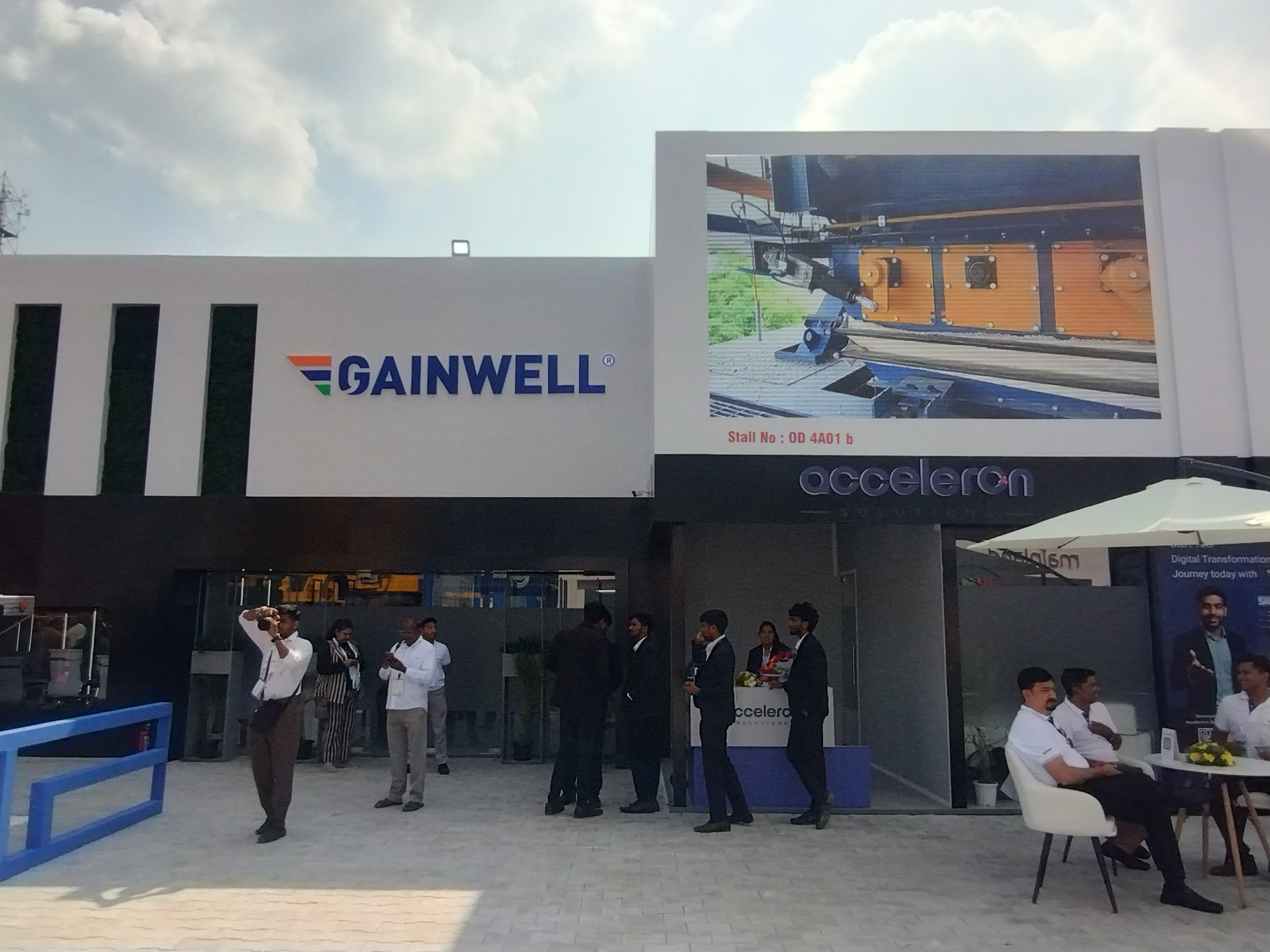
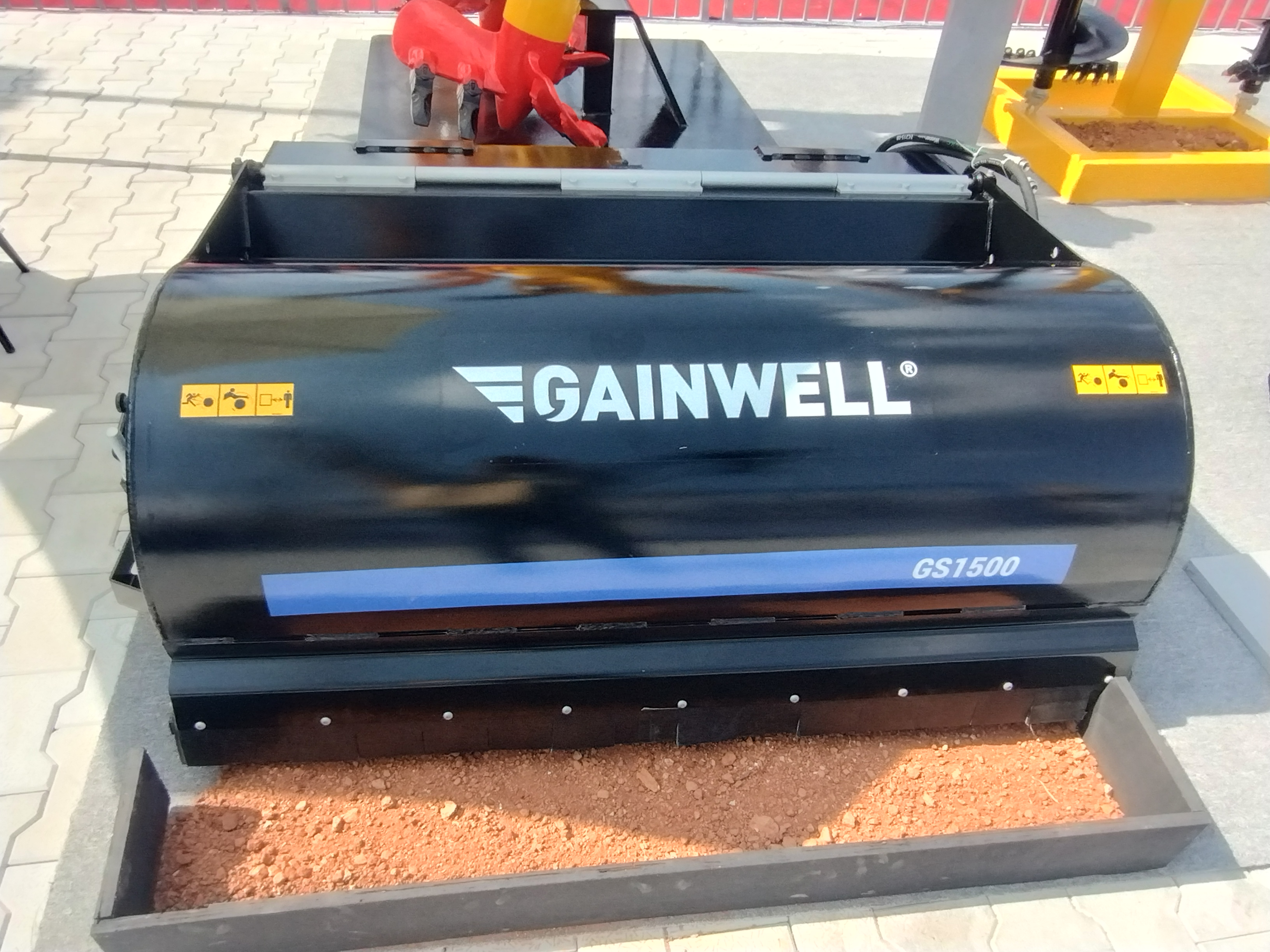
Gainwell India (left) and its product GS1500 (drilling machine) (right) at EXCON 2025
