= Authorized service provider =

An authorized service provider (ASP) or Authorized Repair Provider (ARP) is defined in New York General Business Law § 399-nn is defined to mean "An individual or business who has an arrangement with the original equipment manufacturer under which the original equipment manufacturer grants to the individual or business a license to use a trade name, service mark, or other proprietary identifier for the purposes of offering the services of diagnosis, maintenance or repair of digital electronic equipment under the name of the original equipment manufacturer, or other arrangement with the original equipment manufacturer to offer such services on behalf or the original equipment manufacturer."

ASPs and ARPs are often used to provide in-warranty and post-warranty repair work, but not exclusively. Many in-warranty and post-warranty repairs are made by sub-contracted repair companies, including Independent repair providers, under contract to the OEM. As the original equipment manufacturer is paying for the services they can require various forms of training and supervision as a condition of their contract. These requirements do not extend to the equipment owner selecting their own repair services including do-it-yourself repair activities.

In the US, federal warranty law -- the Magnuson-Moss warranty act prohibits manufacturers from voiding warranties if the customer uses non-original equipment parts or services performed by others, including themselves. The burden of proof of external damage is on the warrantor, not the consumer. The Federal Trade Commission has commented in their Nixing the Fix Workshop that disparagement of ISPs is not backed by evidence, nor are contentions that ASP/ARP repairs are of any higher quality than those made by independent providers.

The relationship of an ASP or ARP is contractual and does not reflect any specific competency or quality. Most ASP and ARP relationships include a sales volume requirement as a condition of the arrangement. In this respect they are operating as sales agents of the manufacturer. Many ASP/ARP relationships are also exclusive to a single brand. Further, the ASP/ARP relationship is also one of limitations on the variety of repairs or services allowed by the OEM. Such limitations may include extensive requirements unrelated to repair.
