= Melvyn Smith =

Melvyn Smith (11 November 1955 – 22 November 2022) was an astronautics consultant and spaceflight writer, and a Fellow of the British Interplanetary Society,

He wrote Illustrated History of the Space Shuttle 1985, which was reprinted (twice) 1986, and second edition 1989. He worked and researched at the then-Rockwell (Downey and Anaheim, California) facilities during assembly of the first Space Shuttle orbiters, and various NASA centres and contractors during the 1980s. After six years in the 1990s as joint Director of a marketing and design company, Smith was working full-time in the UK data communications supply industry.

Smith's 1985 book, An Illustrated History of the Space Shuttle, is a large-sized picture book oriented toward satisfying the popular market. Almost half of it is concerned with earlier high-speed, high- altitude flight as a means of paving the way for the Shuttle. It recites and publishes photographs of early aircraft, such as the Bell X-1, the X-15, and lifting body studies before going into a discussion of the Shuttle. This discussion focuses on the technological development of the orbiter, especially test and evaluation. A chapter is then devoted to each of the Shuttle orbiters built, dealing with their procurement, construction, test and evaluation, and mission performance. There is a helpful set of appendices discussing each of the X-15, M2F2, HL-10, X-24, M2F3, and Shuttle flights.

Smith was also the author of 100E Super Profile. The history and development of the 100E series of small Ford saloons manufactured between 1953 and 1962. He is a former registrar and the founder of the 100E Register in the UK based Ford Sidevalve Owner's Club.

== See also ==
- History of rockets
- Space Transportation System
- Spaceplane
