= Bruce Peterson =

American test pilot (1933–2006)

Bruce A. Peterson
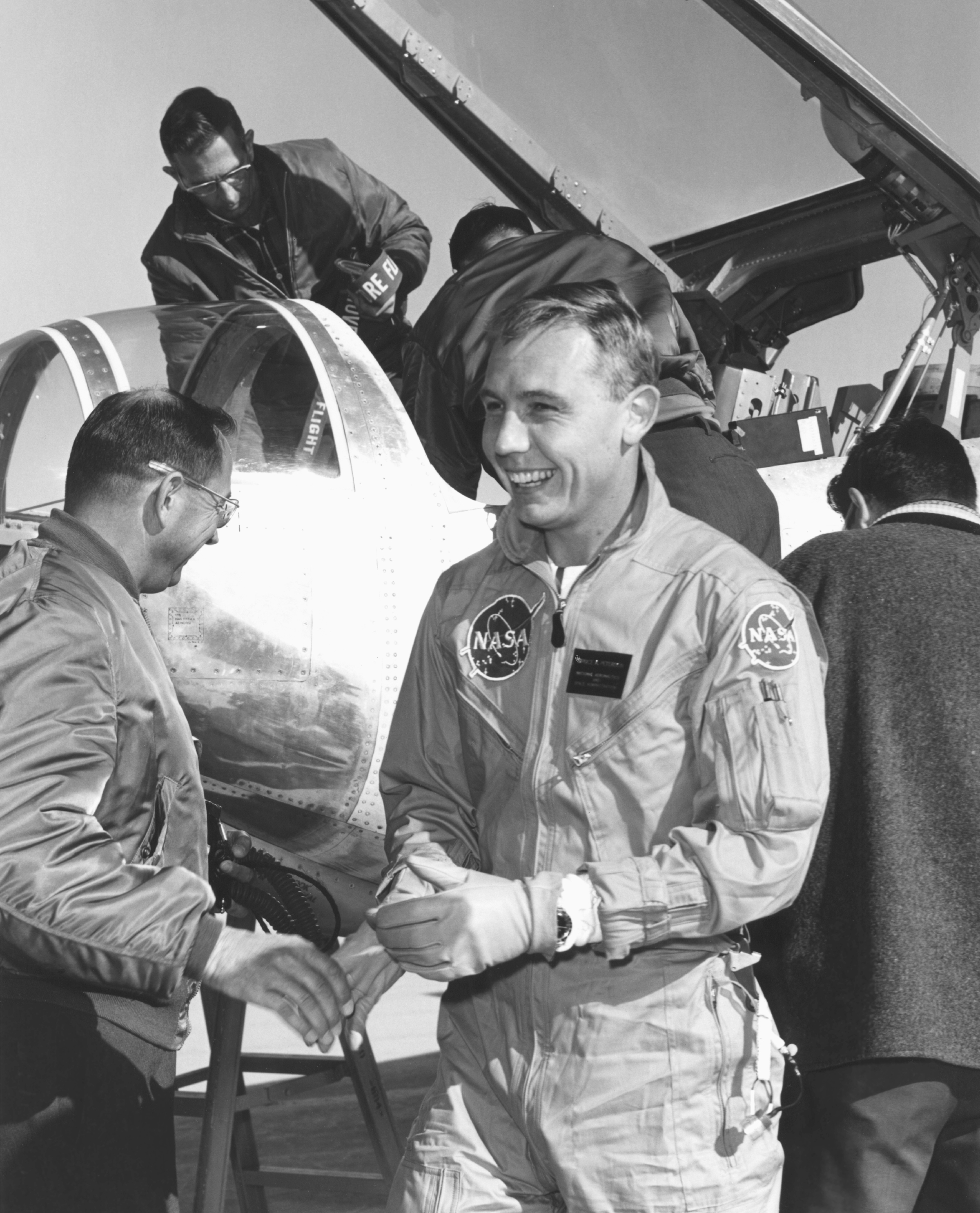
- Born: May 23, 1933; Washburn, North Dakota, U.S.
- Died: May 1, 2006 (aged 72); Laguna Niguel, California, U.S.
- Other name: Bruce A. Peterson
- Education: University of California at Los Angeles; Cal Poly, B.S. 1960
- Occupations: Naval aviator, test pilot
- Awards: NASA Exceptional Leadership Award; Tony LeVier Flight Test Safety Award
- Space career

NASA Research / Test Pilot
- Missions: none

Bruce A. Peterson (May 23, 1933 – May 1, 2006) was an American aeronautical engineer, and test pilot for NASA.

== Biography ==
=== Early life and education ===
Peterson was born on May 23, 1933. A native of Washburn, North Dakota, he attended the University of California at Los Angeles from 1950 to 1953, and California Polytechnic State University from 1958 to 1960. While at UCLA he held a job as an aircraft assembler for Douglas Aircraft Company. Peterson graduated with a Bachelor of Science degree in Aeronautical Engineering from Cal Poly in 1960.

=== Flight experience and NASA career ===
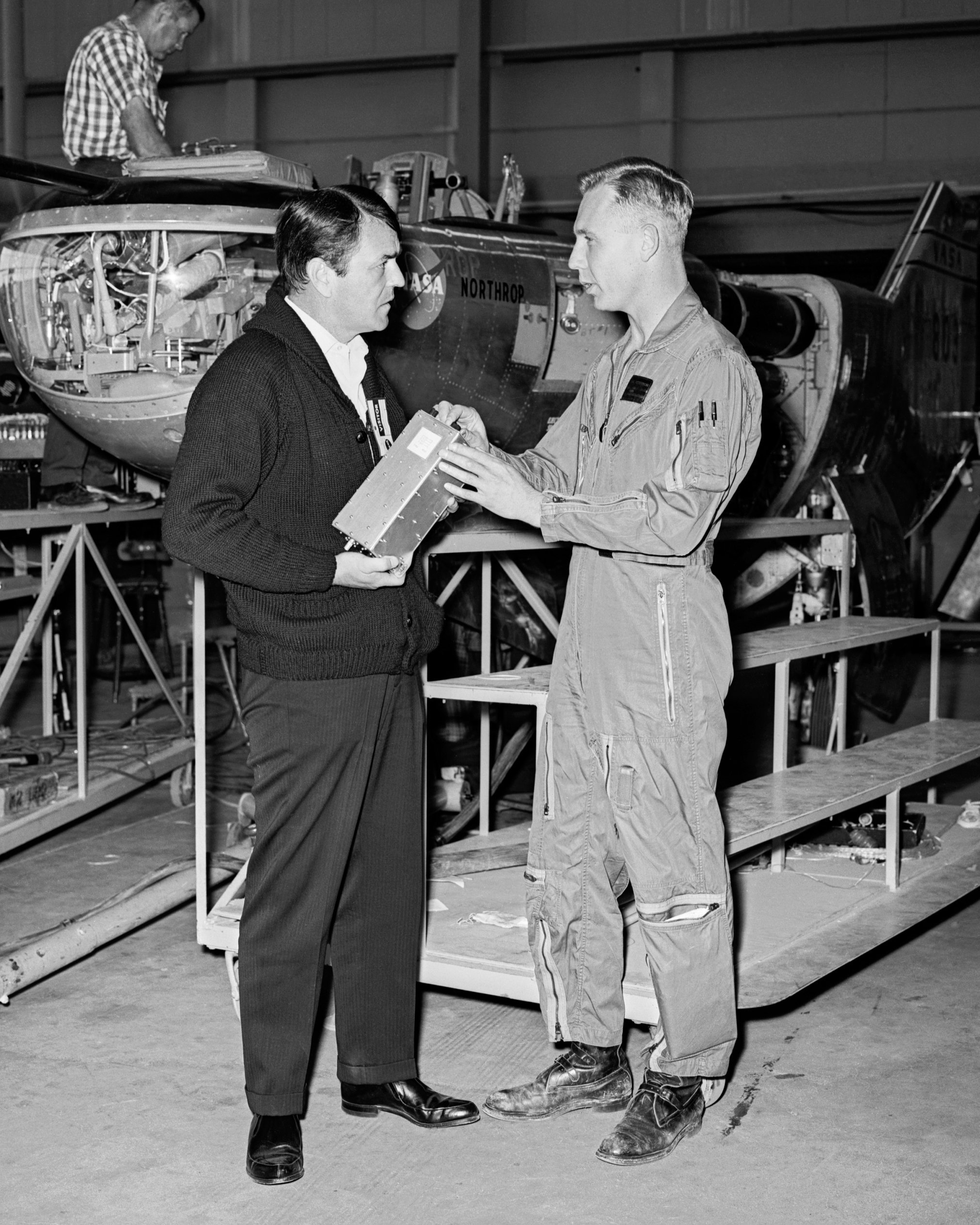
Bruce Peterson with actor James Doohan (left) discussing the M2-F2 Lifting Body in 1967

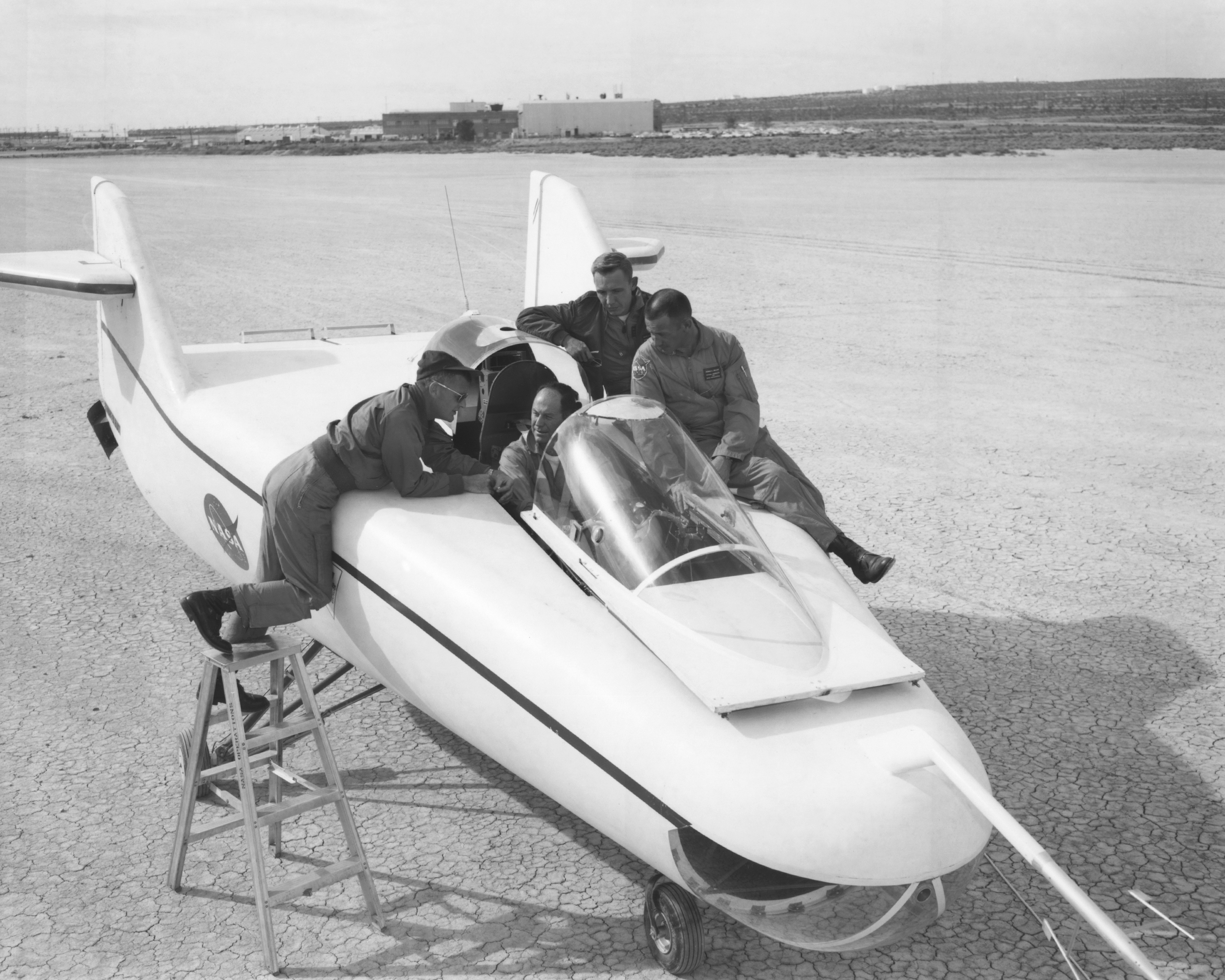
Bruce Peterson, 3rd from left, with fellow pilots Milt Thompson, Don Mallick and Chuck Yeager (in the cockpit of the M2-F1)

Following attending UCLA, Peterson enlisted as a naval aviation cadet and was commissioned a second lieutenant in the U.S. Marine Corps in 1954. He was released from active duty three years later. Upon receiving his bachelor's degree from Cal Poly, Peterson joined NASA in August 1960 as an engineer at the Dryden Flight Research Center. After graduating from the U.S. Air Force Test Pilot School (Class 62C) at Edwards Air Force Base, California, and transferring to flight operations in 1962, he was assigned as one of the project pilots on the Rogallo paraglider research vehicle (Paresev) program. He made his first Paresev research flight on March 14, 1962. He was injured when the craft crashed from a height of about 10 feet (3 m) during a ground tow flight. Always the consummate engineer, his first question after impact was, "What happened to the lateral stick forces?"

As a NASA research pilot, he flew a wide variety of airplanes, including the F5D-1, F-100, F-104, F-111A, B-52, NT-33A Variable Stability Trainer, the wingless lifting bodies and numerous general aviation aircraft as well as several types of helicopters and sailplanes.

On May 10, 1967, during the sixteenth glide flight of a lifting body Northrop M2-F2, a landing accident severely damaged the vehicle and seriously injured Peterson. After an extensive hospitalization, he recovered from his injuries but lost sight in one eye due to a secondary infection while in the hospital. He also made 17 NASA M2-F1, 2 other M2-F2 and 1 Northrop HL-10 lifting body flights.

Portions of M2-F2 footage including Peterson's spectacular crash landing were used for the 1973 TV movie and subsequent series, The Six Million Dollar Man during the opening credits of every episode. Peterson complained he disliked having his accident repeatedly replayed on television so often.

Despite his injuries, Peterson continued to fly NASA support missions, occasional research flights and continued his Marine Reserve flying duties until 1971. During his flying career, Peterson logged more than 6,000 flight hours in nearly 70 types of aircraft.

Peterson continued at Dryden as a research project engineer on the F-8 Digital Fly-By-Wire program of the late 1960s and early 1970s. He later assumed responsibility for safety and quality assurance for Dryden until his retirement in 1981.

=== Post-NASA career ===
He then joined the Northrop Corporation, where he assumed responsibility for safety and quality assurance for testing the B-2 Advanced Technology Bomber. From 1982 until 1994 Peterson worked in Northrop's B-2 division (Advanced Systems Division) in Pico Rivera, California, at Air Force Plant 42 in Palmdale, California, and at Edwards Air Force Base, becoming manager of system safety and human factors.

=== Later life and death ===
Peterson resided in Orange County, California, and Ocean Springs, California, until his death on May 1, 2006, at age 72, after a long illness.

== Organizations and special honors ==
Peterson was a fellow of the Society of Experimental Test Pilots and 2002 recipient of the Tony LeVier Flight Test Safety Award. He was honored by NASA with an Exceptional Leadership Award for his work on preparations for the first Space Shuttle landing at NASA Dryden in April 1981. In 2003 he was inducted into the Aerospace Walk of Honor in Lancaster, California.
