= Betty Love =

American human computer (born 1922)

- Born: Betty Scott Love; 1922; Pasadena, California, U.S.
- Education: Antelope Valley Junior College (AA)
- Occupations: Mathematician, human computer, historian
- Employers: NACA; NASA (1958–1974)
- Known for: Calculating data for early spaceflight

Betty Scott Love (born 1922) is an American retired human computer who worked for NASA and its predecessor organization, the National Advisory Committee for Aeronautics. Love began working for NACA in 1952, supporting engineers by converting raw experimental measurements into usable mathematical results. She manually calculated flight-test data for the Bell X-1 to the X-15.

Following her retirement in 1974, Love worked as a volunteer in NASA Armstrong's history office starting in 1996.

== Early life and education ==
Love was born in Pasadena, California in 1922.

She had originally intended to be an airline hostess. Because flight attendants at the time were expected to be registered nurses, Love studied the sciences in junior college, aiming to go to nursing school. She was encouraged to apply for NACA despite her lack of a mathematical background.

== Career ==
=== National Advisory Committee for Aeronautics (1952 to 1958) ===
Love began working for NACA Muroc Unit in 1952. She became an Aeronautical Engineering Technician in the Aero Structures Branch in 1955.

=== NASA (1958 to 1974) ===
In NASA, Love worked on the North American XB-70 Valkyrie.

== Later life ==
On October 16, 2009, Love received honors by the Flight Test Historical Foundation. She received the Milton O. Thompson Award in November 2013.
