= R. Dale Reed =

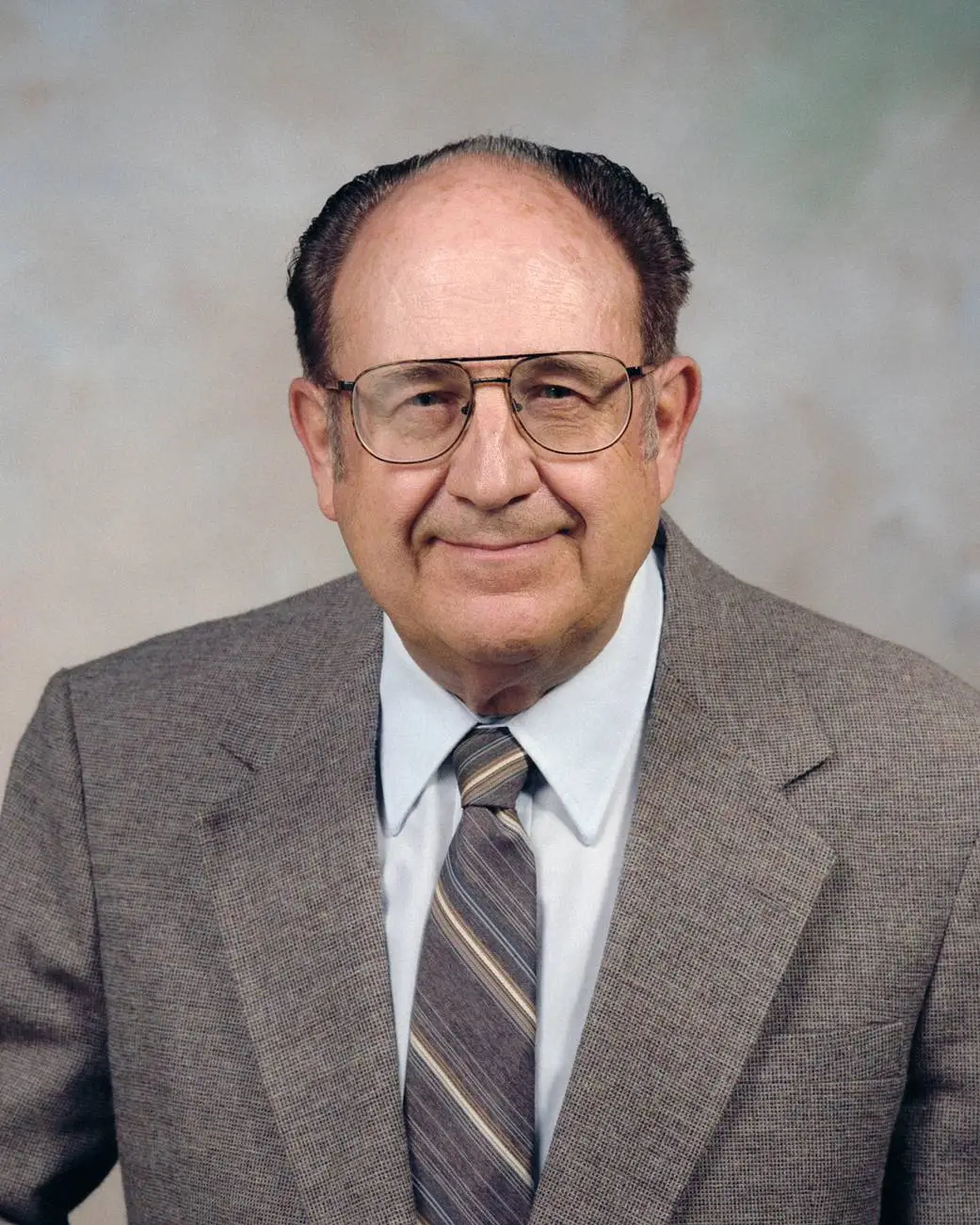
- A portrait photograph of R. Dale Reed in 1998.
- Born: Robert Dale Reed; February 20, 1930
- Died: March 18, 2005 (aged 75)
- Known for: Pioneering lifting body and remotely piloted research aircraft
- Engineering career
- Employer: NASA (Dryden Flight Research Center)

Robert Dale Reed (February 20, 1930 – March 18, 2005) was an aerospace engineer who pioneered lifting body aircraft and remotely piloted research aircraft programs for NASA at Dryden Flight Research Center.

== Early life ==
Reed was born on February 20, 1930. As a teenager, he attended high school in Hailey, Idaho. He developed an interest in airplanes around age 12, and at age 16 began flight training in an Aeronca Defender L-3 with local pilot Bob Silveria after receiving aeronautics instruction from his physics and chemistry teacher, Mr. Kinney.

Reed went on to study mechanical engineering at the University of Idaho in Moscow, Idaho. Although the university did not offer a degree in aeronautical engineering, he took as many aeronautics courses as possible while completing his studies.

== Career ==
=== 1950s ===
Reed joined NASA's Dryden Flight Research Center in 1953. His first roles involved measuring the aerodynamic loads via gauges, accelerometers and gyros on the control surfaces of various aircraft, including the Bell X-5. He also conducted flight research with the X-lE, F-100A, D-558-11, and X-15.

=== 1960s ===
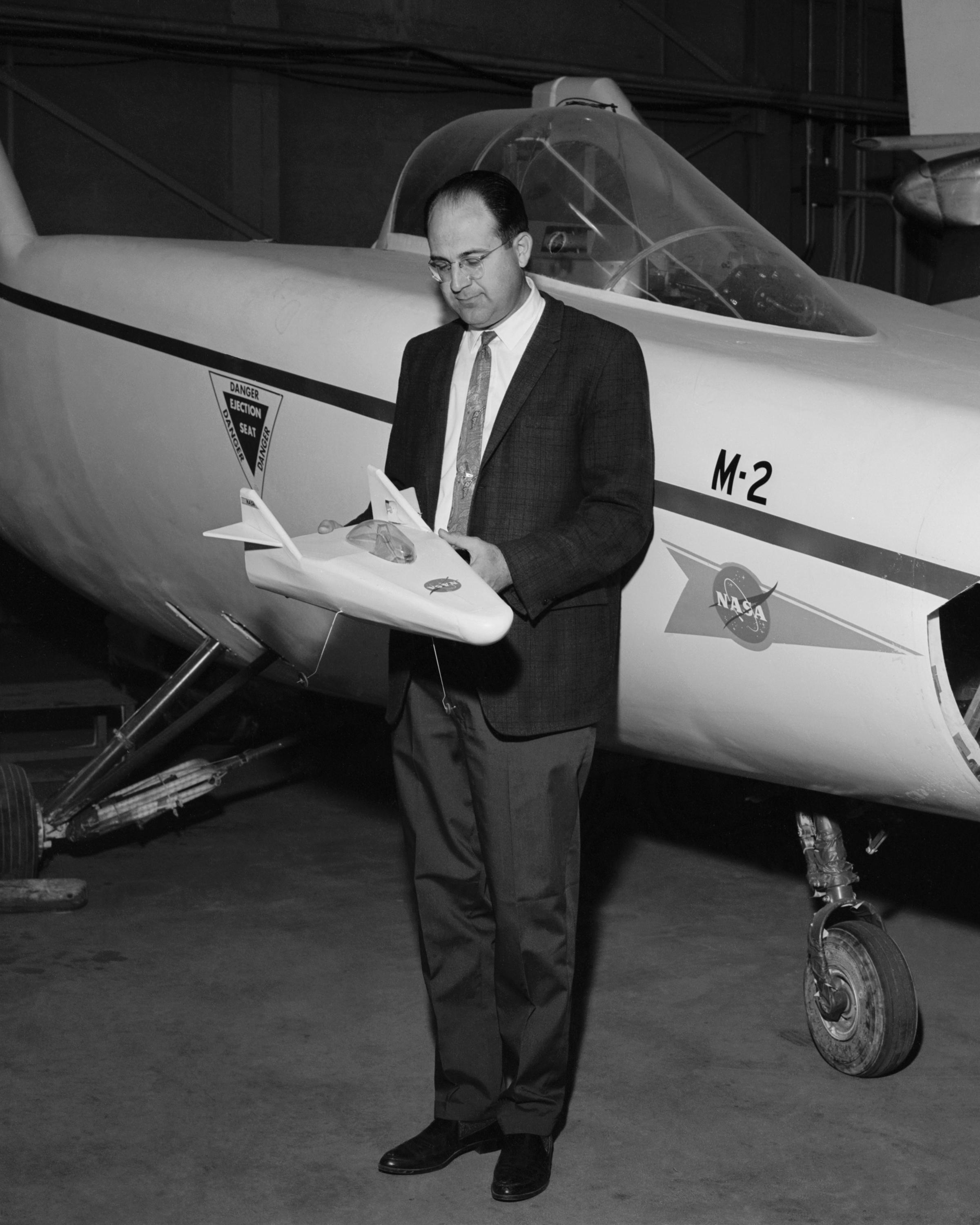
Dale Reed with small M2-F1 model

In 1962, Reed initiated discussions regarding wingless flight concepts with engineers at NASA's Ames and Langley research centers. To counter prevailing industry skepticism, he constructed a free-flight scale model of a half-cone configuration, which laid the technical groundwork for the M2-F1 – the first lifting body developed at the NASA Flight Research Center.

Recognizing that transitioning the project to a full-scale program required pilot evaluation, Reed collaborated with NASA research engineer Dick Eldredge to design a piloted glider configuration based on the successful balsa-wood model. Together, Reed and Eldredge approached NASA research pilot Milt Thompson, pitching the lifting body concept and successfully convincing him to join the project as its primary test pilot. With Thompson's backing, the team secured internal authorization from Flight Research Center director Paul Bikle to construct the full-scale M2-F1 prototype.

== Later life ==
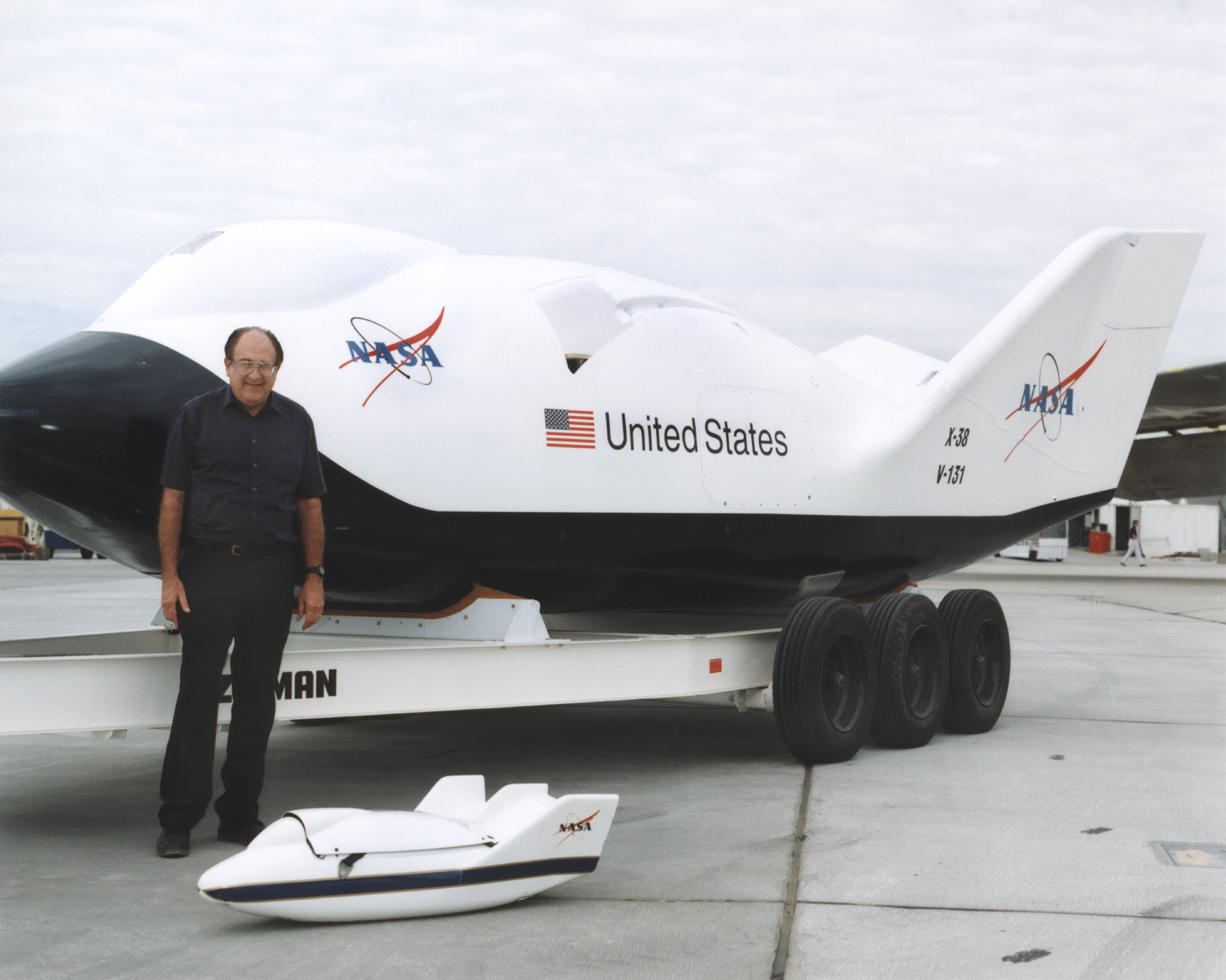
Dale Reed with the X-38 and a subscale model used in the test program.

Reed retired in 1985, but returned as a contract aerospace engineer to work on the X-33, X-36 and X-38 research vehicles, two of which featured lifting body configurations. In all, Reed managed 19 projects and designed a dozen aircraft during his career.

He died March 18, 2005, in San Diego.

== Awards ==
Before his retirement from NASA in 1985, Reed won four NASA awards ranging from the Exceptional Service Medal to an Associate Fellow Award.

== Sources ==
- Reed, R. Dale; Lister, Darlene (1997). Wingless Flight: The Lifting Body Story. Washington, D.C.: National Aeronautics and Space Administration. ISBN 978-0-16-049390-4.
- Hallion, Richard P.; Gorn, Michael H. (2004). On the Frontier: Experimental Flight at NASA Dryden. Washington, D.C.: Smithsonian Institution. ISBN 978-0-16-068142-4.
- Dunbar, Brian (January 12, 2009). "Driving Forces: R. Dale Reed". NASA.
- "m2-f3 lifting body: Topics by Science.gov". Science.gov.
- Kempel, Robert; Painter, Weneth (June 20, 1994). "Development and flight testing of the HL-10 lifting body". AIAA Biennial Flight Test Conference. doi:10.2514/6.1994-2180.
