= Northrop HL-10 =

NASA lifting body prototype

HL-10
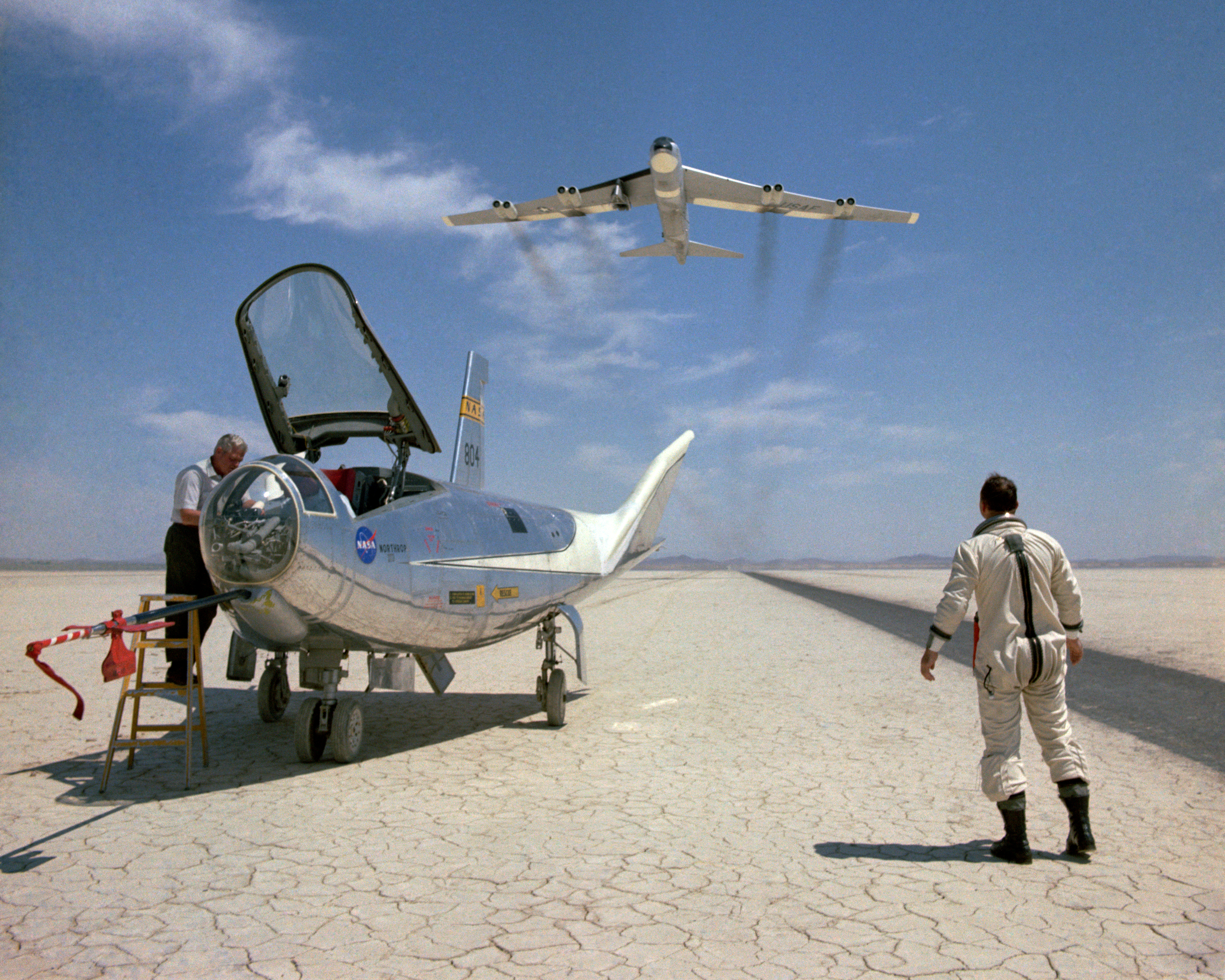

General information
- Type: Lifting body technology demonstrator
- Manufacturer: Northrop
- Designer: Langley Research Center
- Status: On display, NASA Armstrong Flight Research Center
- Primary user: NASA
- Number built: 1

History
- First flight: 22 December 1966
- Retired: 17 July 1970

The Northrop HL-10 is one of five U.S. heavyweight lifting body designs flown at NASA's Flight Research Center (FRC—later the Dryden Flight Research Center and now the Armstrong Flight Research Center) in Edwards, California, from July 1966 to November 1975 to study and validate the concept of safely maneuvering and landing a low lift-over-drag vehicle designed for reentry from space. It was a NASA design and was built to evaluate "inverted airfoil" lifting body and delta planform. It currently is on display at the entrance to the Armstrong Flight Research Center at Edwards Air Force Base.

== Development ==
Northrop Corporation built the HL-10 and Northrop M2-F2, the first two of the fleet of "heavy" lifting bodies flown by the NASA Flight Research Center. The contract for construction of the HL-10 and the M2-F2 was $1.8 million. "HL" stands for horizontal landing, and "10" refers to the tenth design studied by engineers at NASA's Langley Research Center, Hampton, Virginia. Main gear was a modified T-38 system retracted manually, and lowered by nitrogen pressure. Nose gear was a modified T-39 unit, retracted manually and lowered with nitrogen pressure. Pilot Ejection System was a modified F-106 system. Silver zinc batteries provided electrical power for the control system, flight instruments, radios, cockpit heat, and stability augmentation system. To assist in pre-landing flare, four throttleable hydrogen peroxide rockets provided up to 400 lbf (1.8 kN) of thrust.

== Operational history ==
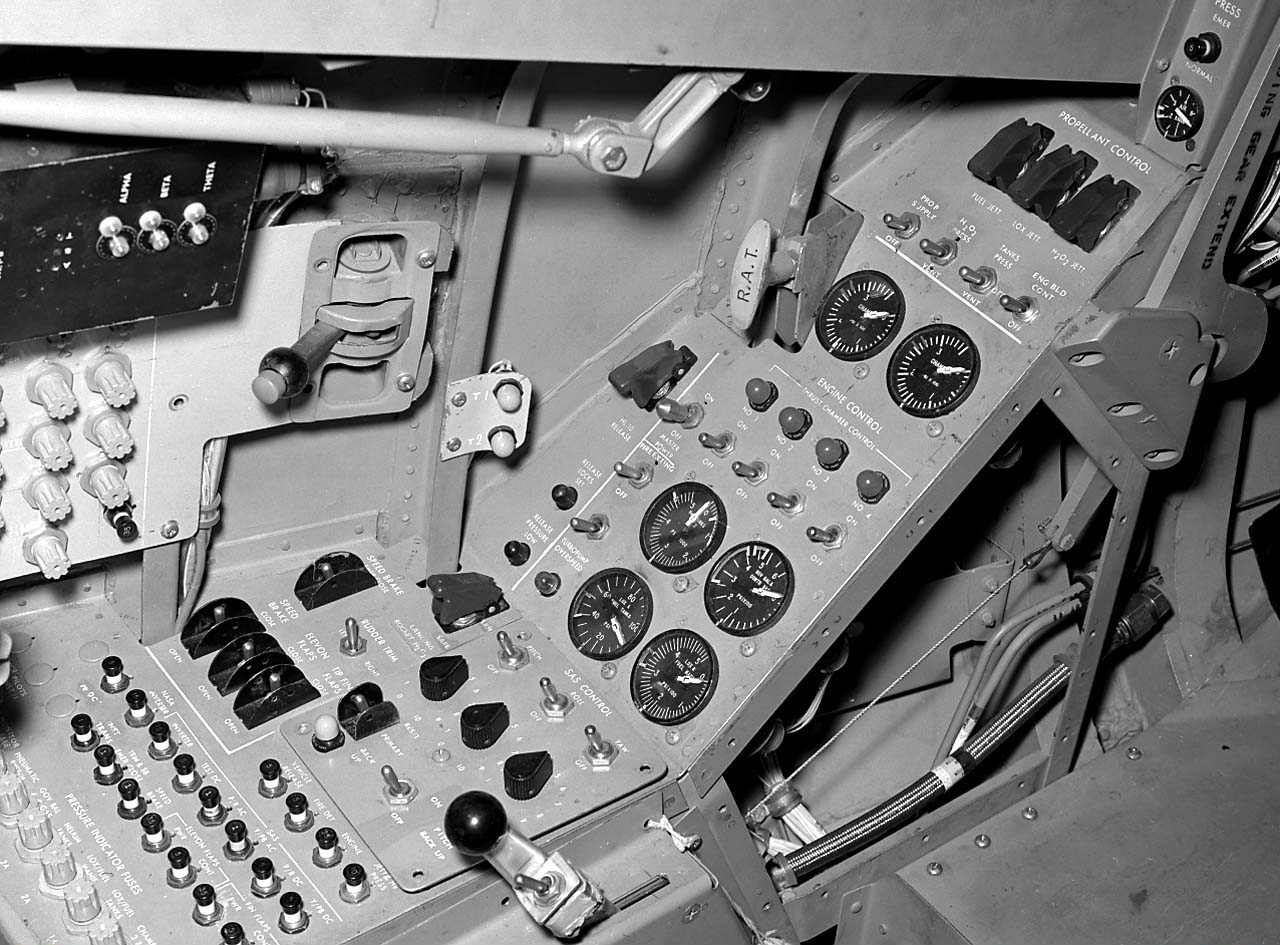
Cockpit of the HL-10 lifting body.

After delivery to NASA in January 1966, the HL-10 made its first flight on December 22, 1966, with research pilot Bruce Peterson in the cockpit. Although the XLR-11 rocket engine (same type used in the Bell X-1) was installed, the first 11 drops from the B-52 launch aircraft were unpowered glide flights to assess handling qualities, stability, and control. In the end, the HL-10 was judged to be the best handling of the three original heavy-weight lifting bodies (M2-F2/F3, HL-10, X-24A).

The HL-10 was flown 37 times during the lifting body research program and logged the highest altitude and fastest speed in the lifting body program. On February 18, 1970, United States Air Force test pilot Peter Hoag piloted the HL-10 to Mach 1.86 (1,228 mph or 1,976 km/h). Nine days later, NASA pilot William H. "Bill" Dana flew the vehicle to 90,030 feet (27,440 m), which became the highest altitude reached in the program.

During a typical lifting body flight, the B-52—with the research vehicle attached to the pylon mount on the right wing between the fuselage and inboard engine pod—flew to a height of about 45,000 feet (14,000 m) and a launch speed of about 450 mph (720 km/h).

Moments after being dropped, the XLR-11 was lit by the pilot. Speed and altitude increased until the engine was shut down by choice or fuel exhaustion, depending upon the individual mission profile. The lifting bodies normally carried enough fuel for about 100 seconds of powered flight and routinely reached from 50,000 to 80,000 feet (15,000 to 24,000 m) and speeds above Mach 1.

Following engine shutdown, the pilot maneuvered the vehicle through a simulated return-from-space corridor into a pre-planned approach for a landing on one of the lakebed runways on Rogers Dry Lake at Edwards. A circular approach was used to lose altitude during the landing phase. On the final approach leg, the pilot increased his rate of descent to build up energy. At about 100 feet (30 m) altitude, a "flare out" maneuver dropped air speed to about 200 mph (320 km/h) for the landing.

Unusual and valuable lessons were learned through the successful flight testing of the HL-10. During the early phases of the Space Shuttle development program, lifting bodies patterned on the HL-10 shape were one of three major types of proposals. These were later rejected as it proved difficult to fit cylindrical fuel tanks into the always-curving fuselage, and from then on most designs focused on more conventional delta wing craft.

- HL-10 pilots
  - John A. Manke — 10 flights, 7 powered flights
  - William H. Dana — 9 flights, 8 powered flights
  - Jerauld R. Gentry — 9 flights, 2 powered flights
  - Peter C. Hoag — 8 flights, 7 powered flights
  - Bruce Peterson — 1 flight, 0 powered flights

=== Unrealized space flight ===
According to the book "Wingless Flight", by project engineer R. Dale Reed, the HL-10 was considered to fly into space in the early to mid-1970s. Following the cancellation of the Apollo moon project, Reed realized that there would be substantial Apollo hardware left over, including several flight-rated command service modules (CSM) and Saturn V rockets.

The proposal was to add an ablative heat shield, reaction controls, and other additional subsystems needed for crewed spaceflight to the HL-10. The now space-rated vehicle would have then been launched in the space for the Lunar Module on a Saturn V launch vehicle with an Apollo CSM. Once in Earth orbit, it was planned that a robotic extraction arm would remove the HL-10 from the rocket's third stage and place it adjacent to the crewed Apollo CSM spacecraft. One of the astronauts would then spacewalk from the Apollo and board the lifting body to perform a pre-reentry check on its systems.

It was planned that there would be two flights in this program. In the first, the lifting body pilot would return to the Apollo and send the HL-10 back to earth uncrewed. If this flight was successful, the second launch would be involve a piloted landing at Edwards AFB. Reportedly, Wernher von Braun was enthusiastic about the mission, offering to prepare two Saturn Vs and Apollo Command Service Modules. However, he was overridden by the Flight Research Center director, and nothing came of the proposal. Launching a Saturn V to low Earth orbit with a light payload would not be an efficient use of capability, and the Apollo program was ended mainly on cost grounds.

== HL-10 flights ==
Vehicle Flight #	Date	Pilot	Mach	Velocity /km/h	Altitude /m	Duration	Comments
HL-10 #1	December 22, 1966	Peterson	0.693	735	13,716	00:03:07	First HL-10 flight Unpowered glide
HL-10 #2	March 15, 1968	Gentry	0.609	684	13,716	00:04:03	Unpowered glide
HL-10 #3	April 3, 1968	Gentry	0.690	732	13,716	00:04:02	Unpowered glide
HL-10 #4	April 25, 1968	Gentry	0.697	739	13,716	00:04:18	Unpowered glide
HL-10 #5	May 3, 1968	Gentry	0.688	731	13,716	00:04:05	Unpowered glide
HL-10 #6	May 16, 1968	Gentry	0.678	719	13,716	00:04:25	Unpowered glide
HL-10 #7	May 28, 1968	Manke	0.657	698	13,716	00:04:05	Unpowered glide
HL-10 #8	June 11, 1968	Manke	0.635	697	13,716	00:04:06	Unpowered glide
HL-10 #9	June 21, 1968	Gentry	0.637	700	13,716	00:04:31	Unpowered glide
HL-10 #10	September 24, 1968	Gentry	0.682	723	13,716	00:04:05	Unpowered glide XLR-11 installed
HL-10 #11	October 3, 1968	Manke	0.714	758	13,716	00:04:03	Unpowered glide
HL-10 #12	October 23, 1968	Gentry	0.666	723	12,101	00:03:09	1st powered flight engine malfunction landed Rosamond
HL-10 #13	November 13, 1968	Manke	0.840	843	13,000	00:06:25	3 tries to light engine
HL-10 #14	December 9, 1968	Gentry	0.870	872	14,454	00:06:34	-
HL-10 #15	April 17, 1969	Manke	0.994	974	16,075	00:06:40	-
HL-10 #16	April 25, 1969	Dana	0.701	744	13,716	00:04:12	Unpowered glide
HL-10 #17	May 9, 1969	Manke	1.127	1,197	16,246	00:06:50	1st lifting body supersonic flight
HL-10 #18	May 20, 1969	Dana	0.904	959	14,966	00:06:54	-
HL-10 #19	May 28, 1969	Manke	1.236	1,312	18,959	00:06:38	-
HL-10 #20	June 6, 1969	Hoag	0.665	727	13,716	00:03:51	Unpowered glide
HL-10 #21	June 19, 1969	Manke	1.398	1,484	19,538	00:06:18	-
HL-10 #22	July 23, 1969	Dana	1.444	1,350	19,446	00:06:13	-
HL-10 #23	August 6, 1969	Manke	1.540	1,656	23,195	00:06:12	1st four- chambered flight
HL-10 #24	September 3, 1969	Dana	1.446	1,542	23,762	00:06:54	-
HL-10 #25	September 18, 1969	Manke	1.256	1,341	24,137	00:07:06	-
HL-10 #26	September 30, 1969	Hoag	0.924	980	16,383	00:07:16	-
HL-10 #27	October 27, 1969	Dana	1.577	1,675	18,474	00:06:57	-
HL-10 #28	November 3, 1969	Hoag	1.396	1,482	19,544	00:07:19	-
HL-10 #29	November 17, 1969	Dana	1.594	1,693	19,687	00:06:48	-
HL-10 #30	November 21, 1969	Hoag	1.432	1,532	24,165	00:06:18	-
HL-10 #31	December 12, 1969	Dana	1.310	1,402	24,372	00:07:08	-
HL-10 #32	January 19, 1970	Hoag	1.310	1,399	26,414	00:06:50	-
HL-10 #33	January 26, 1970	Dana	1.351	1,444	26,726	00:06:51	-
HL-10 #34	February 18, 1970	Hoag	1.861	1,976	20,516	00:06:20	Fastest lifting body flight
HL-10 #35	February 27, 1970	Dana	1.314	1,400	27,524	00:06:56	Highest lifting body flight
HL-10 #36	June 11, 1970	Hoag	0.744	810	13,716	00:03:22	Lift/Drag powered approach
HL-10 #37	July 17, 1970	Hoag	0.733	803	13,716	00:04:12	Last flight

=== Aircraft serial number ===
- Northrop HL-10 — NASA 804, 37 flights

=== Status ===
The HL-10 is currently on display at the entrance of Armstrong Flight Research Center at Edwards, CA.

== Specifications (Northrop HL-10) ==
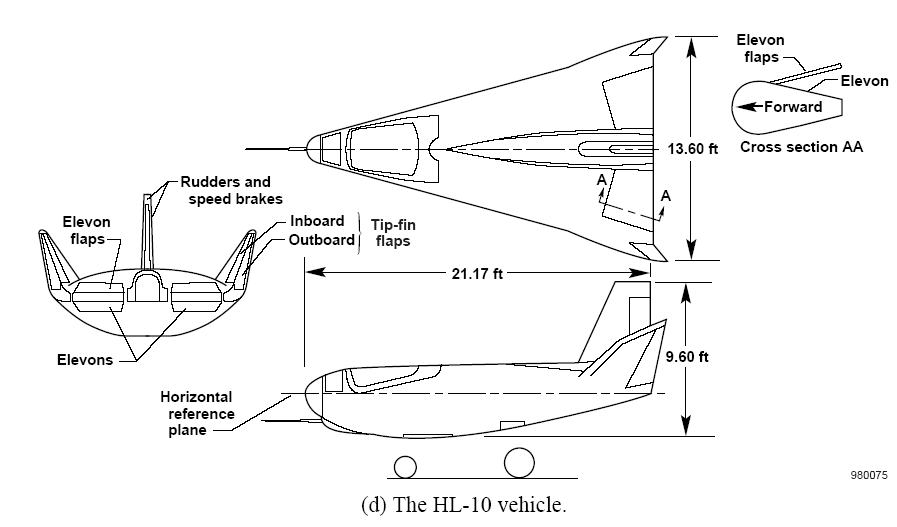
NASA HL-10 Lifting Body Diagram

=== General characteristics ===
- Crew: one pilot
- Length: 21 ft 2 in (6.45 m)
- Wingspan: 13 ft 7 in (4.15 m)
- Height: 9 ft 7 in (2.92 m)
- Wing area: 160 ft^{2} (14.9 m^{2})
- Empty: 5,285 lb (2,397 kg)
- Loaded: 6,000 lb (2,721 kg)
- Maximum takeoff: 10,009 lb (4,540 kg) (propellant wt 3,536 lb - 1,604 kg)
- Powerplant: 1 x Reaction Motors XLR-11 four-chamber rocket engine. 8,000 lbf (35.7 kN) thrust

=== Performance ===
- Maximum speed: 1,228 mph (1,976 km/h)
- Range: 45 miles (72 km)
- Service ceiling: 90,303 ft (27,524 m)
- Rate of climb: ft/min ( m/min)
- Wing loading: 62.5 lb/ft^{2} (304.7 kg/m^{2})
- Thrust-to-weight: 1:0.99

== Fictional references ==
In the pilot movie, and an episode of The Six Million Dollar Man series, titled "The Deadly Replay", the HL-10 serial number 804 is identified as the aircraft flown by Col. Steve Austin when he crashed, leading to his transformation into a bionic man, and the HL-10 is also featured in this episode. Other episodes and Martin Caidin's original novel, Cyborg, contradict this, however, by identifying Austin's aircraft as a fictional cousin of the HL-10, the M3-F5. Further confusion is added by the fact that both the HL-10 and the M2-F2 are featured in the opening credits of the television show.

== See also ==
- HL-20 Personnel Launch System
- X-plane

Aircraft of comparable role, configuration, and era

- Martin Marietta X-24
- NASA M2-F1
- Northrop M2-F2
- Northrop M2-F3
- X-38 Crew Return Vehicle

Related lists

- List of experimental aircraft
