= NASA M2-F1 =

Lifting body prototype

M2-F1
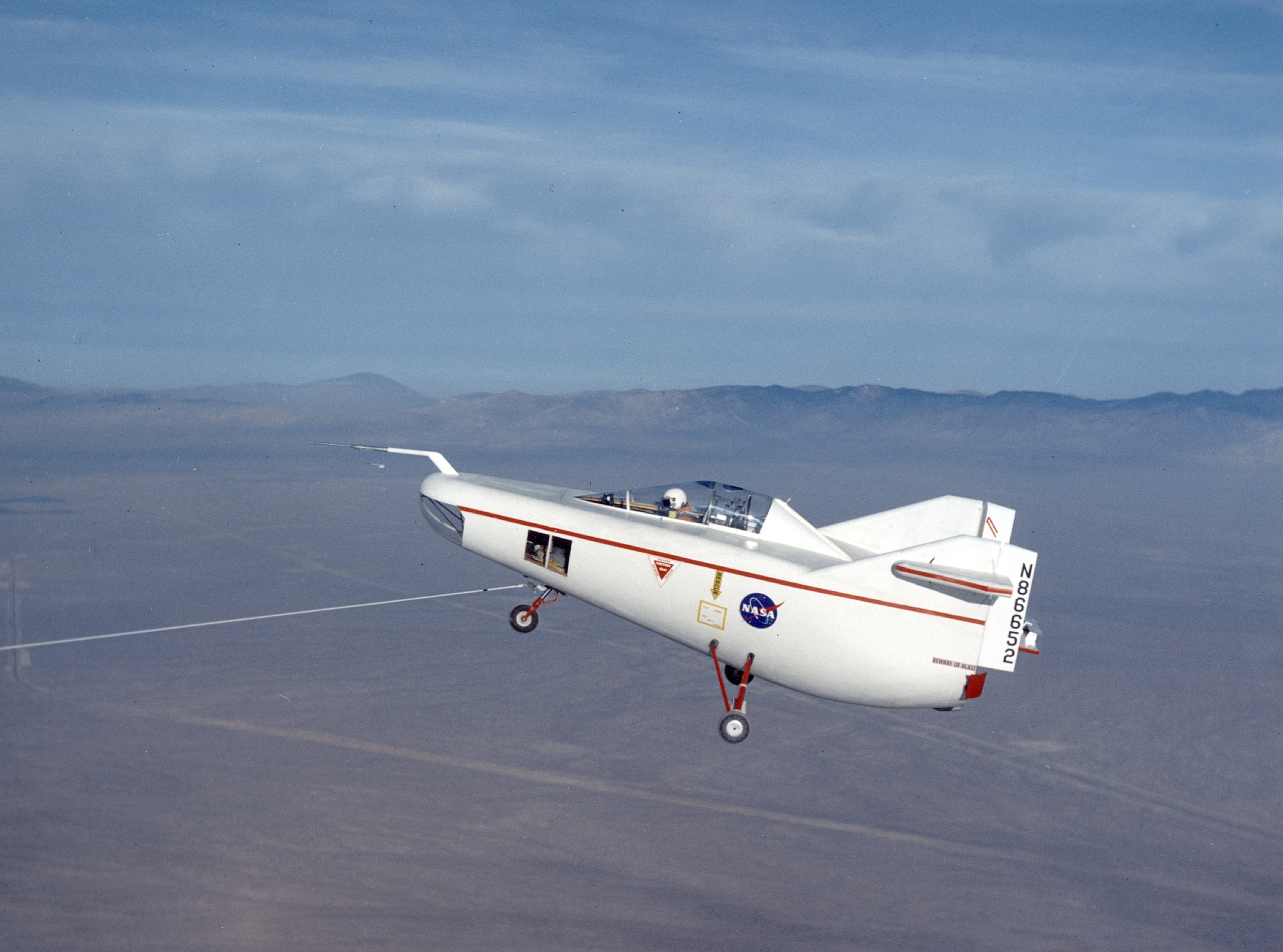

General information
- Type: Lifting-body technology demonstrator
- Manufacturer: Dryden Flight Research Center
- Designer: Ames Research Center
- Status: On display
- Primary user: NASA
- Number built: 1

History
- First flight: 16 August 1963
- Retired: 16 August 1966
- Variants: Northrop M2-F2; Northrop M2-F3

The NASA M2-F1 is a lightweight, unpowered prototype aircraft, developed to flight-test the wingless lifting body concept. Its unusual appearance earned it the nickname "flying bathtub" and was designated the M2-F1, the M referring to "manned", and F referring to "flight" version. In 1962, NASA Dryden management approved a program to build a lightweight, unpowered lifting-body prototype. It featured a plywood shell placed over a tubular steel frame crafted at Dryden. Construction was completed in 1963.

== Development ==
The lifting-body concept originated in the mid-1950s at the National Advisory Committee for Aeronautics' Ames Aeronautical Laboratory, Mountain View, California. By February 1962, a series of possible shapes had been developed, and R. Dale Reed was working to gain support for a research vehicle.

The construction of the M2-F1 was a joint effort by Dryden and a local glider manufacturer, the Briegleb Glider Company. The budget was US$30,000. NASA craftsmen and engineers built the tubular steel interior frame. Its mahogany plywood shell was handmade by Gus Briegleb and company. Ernie Lowder, a NASA craftsman who had worked on Howard Hughes's H-4 Hercules ("Spruce Goose"), was assigned to help Briegleb.

Final assembly of the remaining components (including aluminum tail surfaces, pushrod controls, and landing gear from a Cessna 150, later replaced by Cessna 180 landing gear) was done at the NASA facility.

The wingless, lifting-body aircraft design was initially conceived as a means of landing a spacecraft horizontally after atmospheric reentry. The absence of wings would make the extreme heat of reentry less damaging to the vehicle. Rather than using a ballistic reentry trajectory like a Command Module, very limited in maneuvering range, a lifting-body vehicle had a landing footprint the size of California.

== Tow testing ==
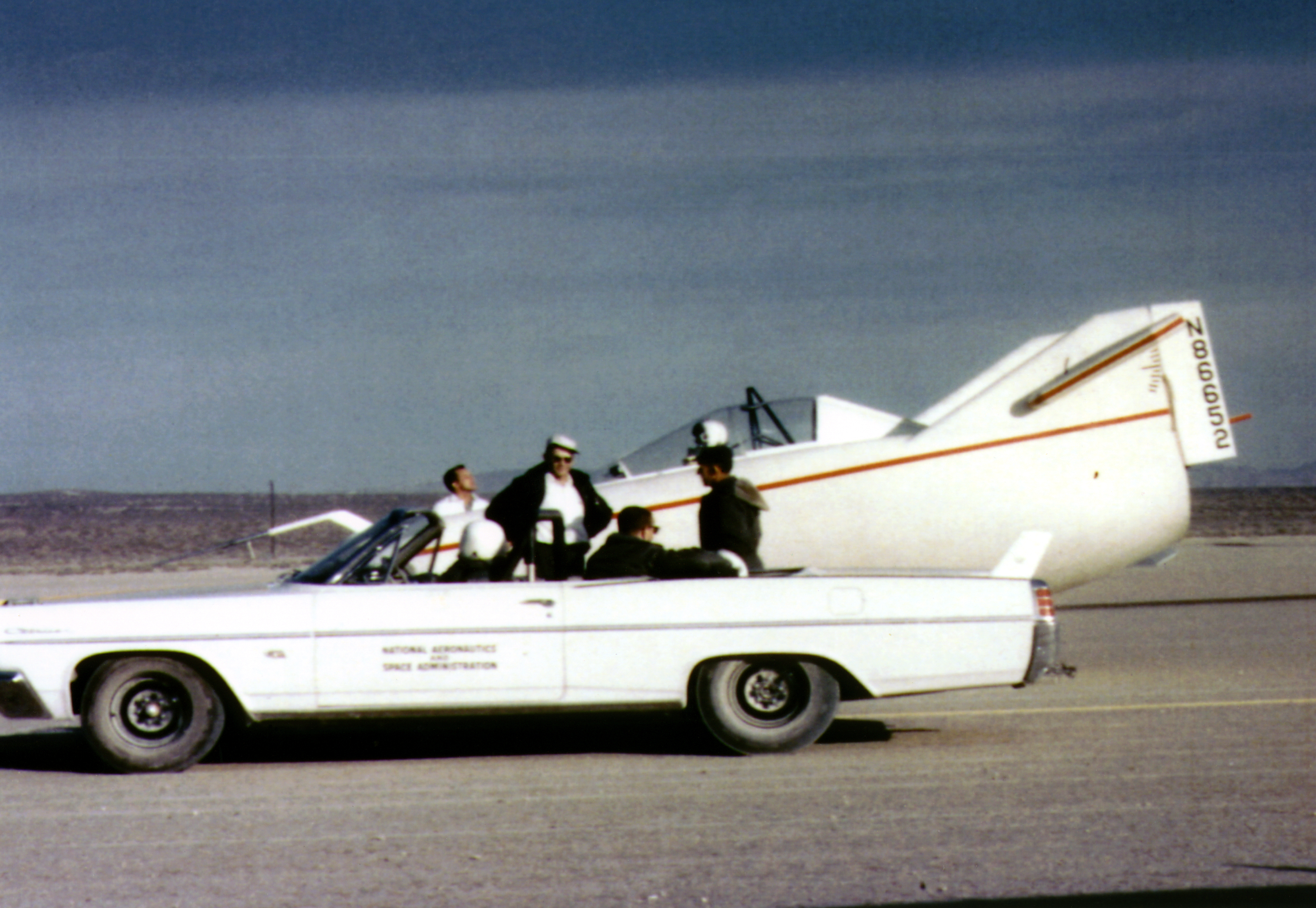
The M2-F1 and its 1963 Pontiac convertible tow vehicle

The first flight tests of the M2-F1 were at Rogers Dry Lake, at the end of a tow rope attached to a 1963 Pontiac Catalina convertible. On April 5, 1963 test pilot Milt Thompson lifted the M2-F1's nose off the ground for the first time while being towed. The speed was 86 miles per hour (138 km/h). The little craft seemed to bounce uncontrollably between the main landing gear wheels, and stopped when he lowered the nose to the ground. He tried again, but each time with the same results. He felt it was a landing gear problem that could have caused the aircraft to roll on its back if he had lifted the main gear off the ground.

After looking at movies of the tests, it was decided that the bouncing was probably caused by unwanted rudder movements. The control system was modified so that the joystick controlled the elevons rather than the rudder, which solved the problem.

It was found that the car used to tow the aircraft was not powerful enough to lift the M2-F1 entirely off the ground, so the FRC arranged to have the tow car hot-rodded by Bill Straub: the modifications tuned the engine for increased power, added a rollbar, and turned the front passenger seat to face aft so the passenger could observe the aircraft. This proved successful, and tow tests continued.

Speeds on tow inched up to 110 miles per hour (180 km/h), which allowed Thompson to climb to about 20 feet (6.1 m), then glide for about 20 seconds after releasing the line. That was the most that could be expected during an auto tow.

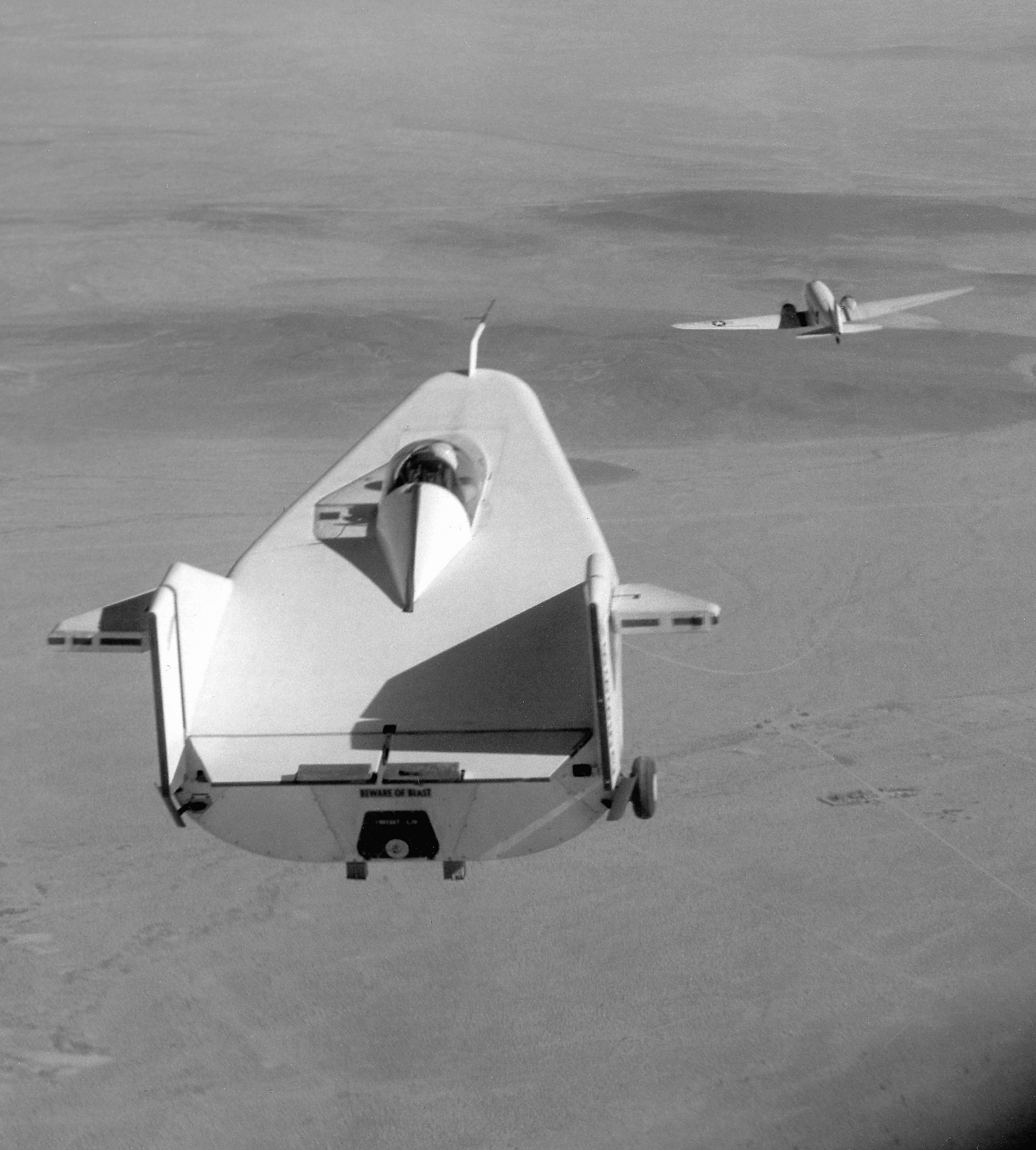
M2-F1 in tow behind a NASA R4D tow plane.

These initial tests produced enough flight data about the M2-F1 to proceed with flights behind a NASA R4D tow plane at greater altitudes.

== Flight testing ==
A NASA R4D, the Navy designation for the Douglas DC-3, was used for all of the air tows. The first was on August 16, 1963. The M2-F1 had recently been equipped with an ejection seat and small rockets – referred to by the test team as "instant L/D" – in the tail to extend the landing flare for about 5 seconds if needed, and Thompson prepared for the flight with a few more tows behind the Pontiac.

Forward visibility in the M2-F1 was very limited on tow, requiring Thompson to fly about 20 feet (6.1 m) higher than the R4D, so he could see the plane through the nose window. Towing speed was about 100 miles per hour (160 km/h).

The R4D took the craft to an altitude of 12,000 feet (3,700 m), where free flights back to Rogers Dry Lake began. Pilot for the first series of flights of the M2-F1 was NASA research pilot Milt Thompson. Typical glide flights with the M2-F1 lasted about two minutes and reached speeds of 110 to 120 miles per hour (180 to 190 km/h).

Tow release was at 12,000 feet (3,700 m). The lifting body descended at an average rate of about 3,600 feet per minute (1,100 m/min). At 1,000 feet (300 m) above the ground, the nose was lowered to increase speed to about 150 miles per hour (240 km/h), flare was at 200 feet (61 m) from a 20° dive. The landing was smooth, and the lifting-body program was on its way.

The M2-F1 was flown until August 16, 1966. It proved the lifting-body concept and led the way for subsequent metal "heavyweight" designs. Chuck Yeager, Bruce Peterson and Donald L. Mallick also flew the M2-F1.

More than 400 ground tows and 77 aircraft tow flights were carried out with the M2-F1. The success of Dryden's M2-F1 program led to NASA's development and construction of two heavyweight lifting bodies based on studies at NASA's Ames and Langley research centers – the Northrop M2-F2 and the Northrop HL-10, both built by the Northrop Corporation, and the U.S. Air Force's X-24 program. The lifting-body program also heavily influenced the Space Shuttle program.

The M2-F1 program demonstrated the feasibility of the lifting-body concept for horizontal landings of atmospheric entry vehicles. It also demonstrated a procurement and management concept for prototype flight research vehicles that produced rapid results at very low cost (approximately US$50,000, excluding salaries of government employees assigned to the project).

=== Pilots ===
- Milt Thompson – 45 flights
- Bruce Peterson – 17 flights
- Chuck Yeager – 5 flights
- Donald M. Sorlie – 5 flights
- Donald L. Mallick – 2 flights
- Jerauld R. Gentry – 2 flights
- Bill Dana – 1 flight
- James W. Wood – 1 ground tow
- Fred Haise – 1 ground tow
- Joe Engle – 1 ground tow

=== Aircraft serial number ===
- NASA M2-F1 – N86652, 77 flights, 400 ground tows

== Aircraft on display ==
As of January 23, 2015, M2-F1 N86652 is on display at the Air Force Flight Test Museum on Edwards Air Force Base, California.

== Specifications ==
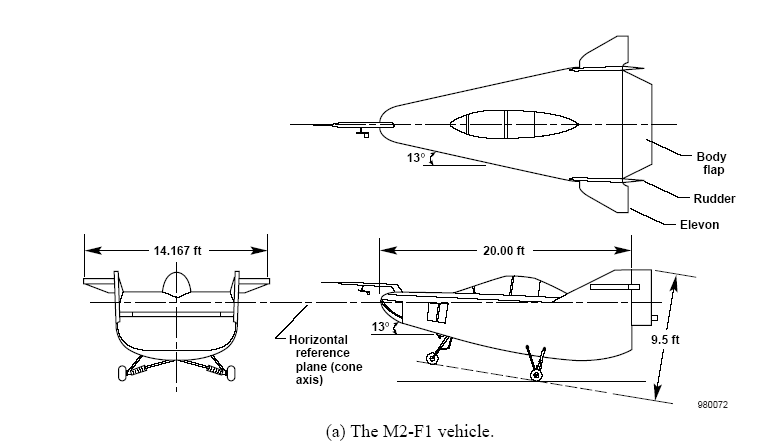
NASA M2-F1 lifting-body diagram

General characteristics

- Crew: 1
- Length: 20 ft (6.1 m)
- Wingspan: 14 ft 2 in (4.32 m)
- Height: 9 ft 6 in (2.90 m)
- Wing area: 139 sq ft (12.9 m^{2})
- Empty weight: 1,000 lb (454 kg)
- Gross weight: 1,182 lb (536 kg)
- Max takeoff weight: 1,250 lb (567 kg)

Performance

- Never exceed speed: 130 kn (150 mph, 240 km/h)
- Aerotow speed: 87 kn (100 mph; 161 km/h)
- Rate of sink: 3,600 ft/min (18 m/s)
- Wing loading: 9 lb/sq ft (44 kg/m^{2})

== Flights ==
Vehicle Flight #	Date	Pilot	Duration	Velocity (km/h)	Altitude (m)	Comments
M2-F1 #0	March 1, 1963	Thompson	-	135	0	First Ground Tow. 400 total ground tows.
M2-F1 #1	August 16, 1963	Thompson	0:02:00	240	3,650	First M2-F1 Flight. 77 total flights.
M2-F1 #2	August 28, 1963	Thompson	0:02:09	240	3,650	-
M2-F1 #3	August 29, 1963	Thompson	0:02:25	240	3,650	-
M2-F1 #4	August 30, 1963	Thompson	0:04:42	240	3,650	1st flight of day
M2-F1 #5	August 30, 1963	Thompson	-	240	3,650	2nd flight of day
M2-F1 #6	September 3, 1963	Thompson	0:04:50	240	3,650	1st flight of day
M2-F1 #7	September 3, 1963	Thompson	-	240	3,650	2nd flight of day
M2-F1 #8	October 7, 1963	Thompson	0:01:26	240	3,650	-
M2-F1 #9	October 9, 1963	Thompson	0:01:51	240	3,650	-
M2-F1 #10	October 15, 1963	Thompson	0:02:20	240	3,650	-
M2-F1 #11	October 23, 1963	Thompson	0:03:00	240	3,650	-
M2-F1 #12	October 25, 1963	Thompson	0:03:52	240	3,650	1st flight of the day
M2-F1 #13	October 25, 1963	Thompson	-	240	3,650	2nd flight of the day
M2-F1 #14	November 8, 1963	Thompson	0:07:45	240	3,650	1st flight of the day
M2-F1 #15	November 8, 1963	Thompson	-	240	3,650	2nd flight of the day
M2-F1 #16	November 8, 1963	Thompson	-	240	3,650	3rd flight of the day
M2-F1 #17	December 3, 1963	Thompson	0:01:00	240	3,650	-
M2-F1 #18	December 3, 1963	Yeager	0:01:35	240	3,650	-
M2-F1 #19	December 3, 1963	Peterson	0:03:15	240	3,650	1st flight of the day
M2-F1 #20	December 3, 1963	Peterson	-	240	3,650	2nd flight of the day Broke landing gear
M2-F1 #21	January 29, 1964	Thompson	-	240	3,650	1st flight of the day
M2-F1 #22	January 29, 1964	Thompson	-	240	3,650	2nd flight of the day
M2-F1 #23	January 29, 1964	Peterson	0:04:44	240	3,650	1st flight of the day
M2-F1 #24	January 29, 1964	Peterson	-	240	3,650	2nd flight of the day
M2-F1 #25	January 29, 1964	Yeager	-	240	3,650	1st flight of the day
M2-F1 #26	January 29, 1964	Yeager	-	240	3,650	2nd flight of the day
M2-F1 #27	January 30, 1964	Yeager	-	240	3,650	1st flight of the day
M2-F1 #28	January 30, 1964	Yeager	-	240	3,650	2nd flight of the day
M2-F1 #29	January 30, 1964	Mallick	-	240	3,650	1st flight of the day
M2-F1 #30	January 30, 1964	Mallick	-	240	3,650	2nd flight of the day
M2-F1 #31	February 28, 1964	Thompson	-	240	3,650	1st flight of the day
M2-F1 #32	February 28, 1964	Thompson	-	240	3,650	2nd flight of the day
M2-F1 #33	March 30, 1964	Peterson	0:02:25	240	3,650	-
M2-F1 #34	April 9, 1964	Thompson	-	240	3,650	1st flight of the day
M2-F1 #35	April 9, 1964	Thompson	-	240	3,650	2nd flight of the day
M2-F1 #36	April 9, 1964	Peterson	0:08:00	240	3,650	1st flight of the day
M2-F1 #37	April 9, 1964	Peterson	-	240	3,650	2nd flight of the day
M2-F1 #38	April 9, 1964	Peterson	-	240	3,650	3rd flight of the day
M2-F1 #39	May 19, 1964	Peterson	0:04:08	240	3,650	1st flight of the day
M2-F1 #40	May 19, 1964	Peterson	-	240	3,650	2nd flight of the day
M2-F1 #41	June 3, 1964	Thompson	-	240	3,650	-
M2-F1 #42	July 24, 1964	Peterson	0:06:50	240	3,650	1st flight of the day
M2-F1 #43	July 24, 1964	Peterson	-	240	3,650	2nd flight of the day
M2-F1 #44	July 24, 1964	Peterson	-	240	3,650	3rd flight of the day
M2-F1 #45	August 18, 1964	Thompson	-	240	3,650	-
M2-F1 #46	August 21, 1964	Thompson	-	240	3,650	1st flight of the day
M2-F1 #47	August 21, 1964	Thompson	-	240	3,650	2nd flight of the day
M2-F1 #48	August 21, 1964	Thompson	-	240	3,650	3rd flight of the day
M2-F1 #49	August 21, 1964	Thompson	-	240	3,650	4th flight of the day
M2-F1 #50	February 16, 1965	Thompson	-	240	3,650	-
M2-F1 #51	May 27, 1965	Thompson	-	240	3,650	1st flight of the day
M2-F1 #52	May 27, 1965	Thompson	-	240	3,650	2nd flight of the day
M2-F1 #53	May 27, 1965	Thompson	-	240	3,650	3rd flight of the day
M2-F1 #54	May 27, 1965	Thompson	-	240	3,650	4th flight of the day
M2-F1 #55	May 27, 1965	Sorlie	0:06:00	240	3,650	1st flight of the day
M2-F1 #56	May 27, 1965	Sorlie	-	240	3,650	2nd flight of the day
M2-F1 #57	May 27, 1965	Sorlie	-	240	3,650	3rd flight of the day
M2-F1 #58	May 28, 1965	Thompson	-	240	3,650	-
M2-F1 #59	May 28, 1965	Sorlie	0:04:30	240	3,650	1st flight of the day
M2-F1 #60	May 28, 1965	Sorlie	-	240	3,650	2nd flight of the day
M2-F1 #61	July 16, 1965	Thompson	-	240	3,650	-
M2-F1 #62	July 16, 1965	Dana	-	240	3,650	-
M2-F1 #63	July 16, 1965	Gentry	0:00:09	200	10	Rolled M2-F1 on liftoff. Recovered. Safe landing.
M2-F1 #64	August 30, 1965	Thompson	-	240	3,650	1st flight of the day
M2-F1 #65	August 30, 1965	Thompson	-	240	3,650	2nd flight of the day
M2-F1 #66	August 30, 1965	Thompson	-	240	3,650	3rd flight of the day
M2-F1 #67	August 31, 1965	Thompson	-	240	3,650	-
M2-F1 #68	October 6, 1965	Thompson	-	240	3,650	1st flight of the day
M2-F1 #69	October 6, 1965	Thompson	-	240	3,650	2nd flight of the day
M2-F1 #70	October 8, 1965	Thompson	-	240	3,650	-
M2-F1 #71	March 28, 1966	Thompson	-	240	3,650	1st flight of the day
M2-F1 #72	March 28, 1966	Thompson	-	240	3,650	2nd flight of the day
M2-F1 #73	August 4, 1966	Peterson	0:02:00	240	3,650	-
M2-F1 #74	August 5, 1966	Peterson	0:04:00	240	3,650	1st flight of the day
M2-F1 #75	August 5, 1966	Peterson	-	240	3,650	2nd flight of the day
M2-F1 #76	August 5, 1966	Peterson	-	240	3,650	3rd flight of the day
M2-F1 #77	August 16, 1966	Gentry	-	200	10	Rolled M2-F1 on liftoff. Recovered. Fired landing rockets. Safe landing. Last flight.

== See also ==
Related development

- Northrop M2-F2
- Northrop M2-F3

Aircraft of comparable role, configuration, and era

- Martin Marietta X-24A
- Martin X-23 PRIME
- Northrop HL-10

Related lists

- List of experimental aircraft
