= Northrop M2-F2 =

Lifting body prototype

M2-F2
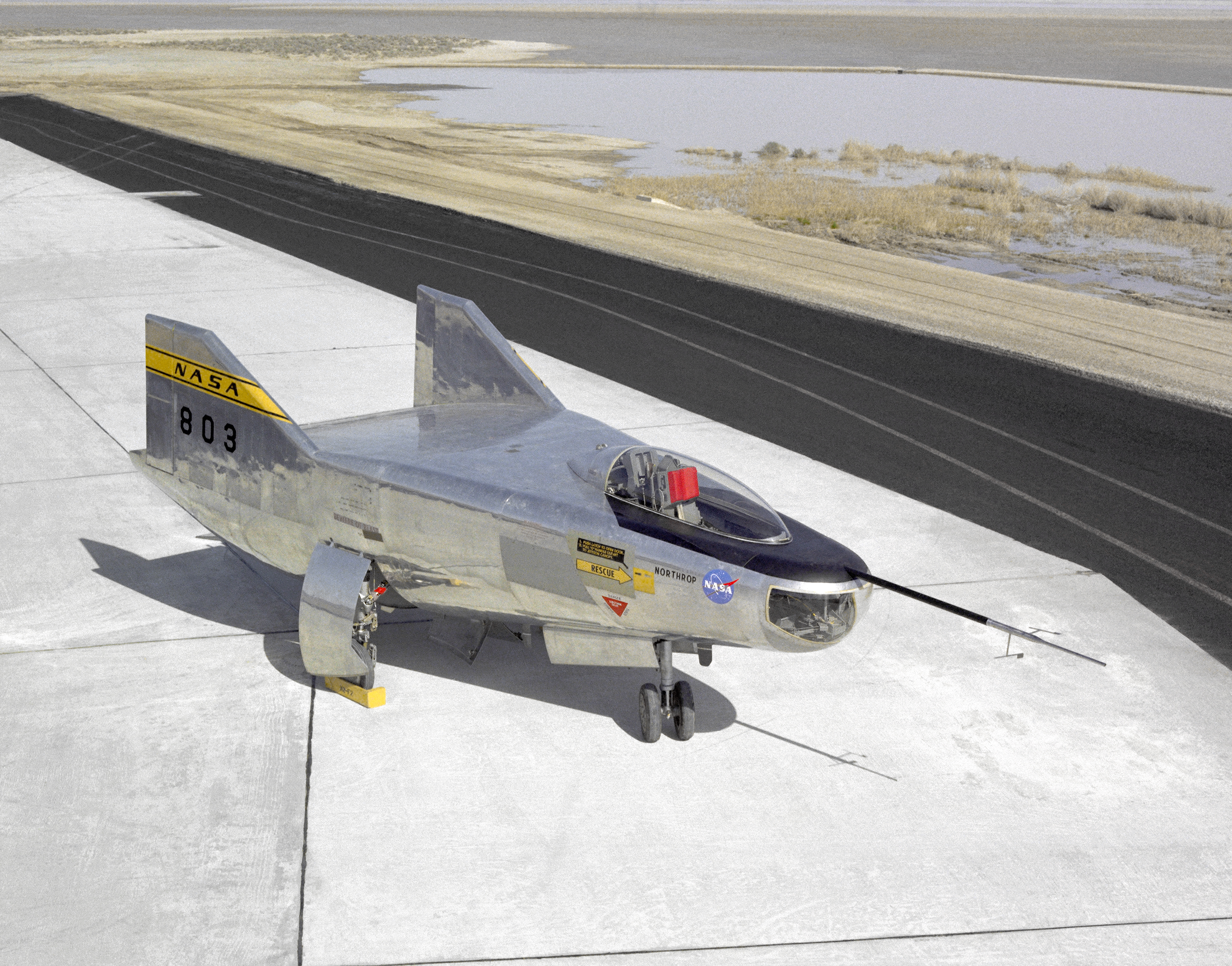

General information
- Type: Lifting body technology demonstrator
- National origin: United States
- Manufacturer: Northrop
- Status: Rebuilt as M2-F3
- Primary user: NASA
- Number built: 1

History
- First flight: 12 July 1966
- Retired: 10 May 1967
- Developed from: NASA M2-F1
- Variants: Northrop M2-F3

The Northrop M2-F2 was a heavyweight lifting body based on studies at NASA's Ames and Langley research centers and built by the Northrop Corporation in 1966.

== Development ==
The success of Dryden's M2-F1 program led to NASA's development and construction of two heavyweight lifting bodies based on studies at NASA's Ames and Langley research centers—the M2-F2 and the HL-10, both built by the Northrop Corporation. The "M" refers to "manned" and "F" refers to "flight" version. "HL" comes from "horizontal landing" and 10 is for the tenth lifting body model to be investigated by Langley.

On March 23, 1966 the M2-F2 made its first captive flight—attached to the B-52 carrier aircraft throughout. The first free gliding flight of the M2-F2 was on July 12, 1966, piloted by Milton O. Thompson. He was dropped from the B-52 carrier aircraft's wing pylon at an altitude of 45,000 ft (14,000 m) and reached a speed of about 450 mph (720 km/h; 390 kn).

== Operational history ==
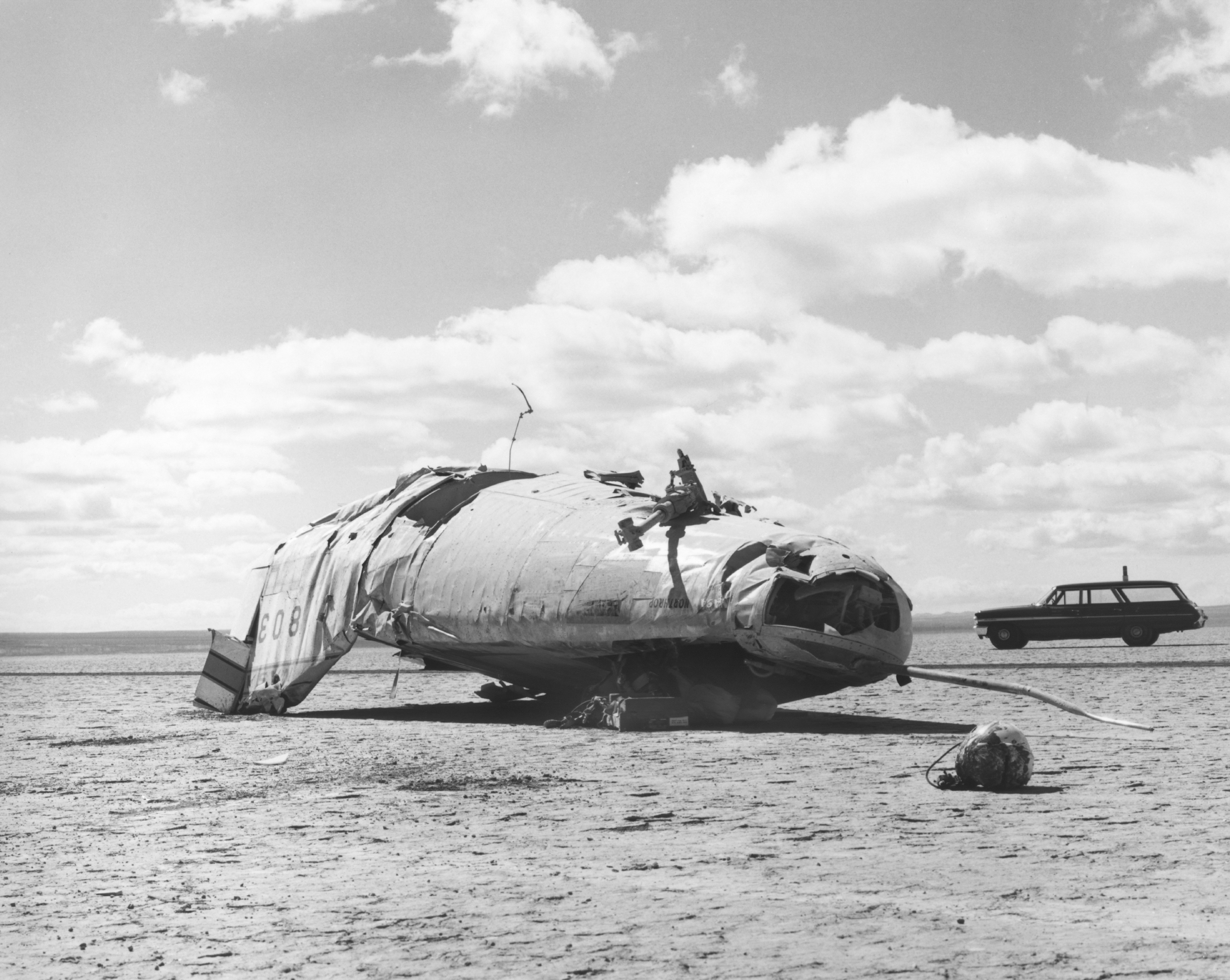
The crash site of the M2-F2

Before powered flights were undertaken, a series of glide flights were conducted. On May 10, 1967, the sixteenth and last glide flight ended in disaster as the vehicle slammed into the lake bed on landing. With test pilot Bruce Peterson at the controls, the M2-F2 suffered a pilot induced oscillation (PIO) as it neared the lake bed. At the core of this problem was that the wings of the M2-F2 (essentially the body of the aircraft) produced considerably less roll authority than most aircraft. This resulted in less force available to the pilot to control the aircraft in roll. The vehicle rolled from side to side in flight as he tried to bring it under control. Peterson recovered, but then observed a rescue helicopter that seemed to pose a collision threat. Distracted, Peterson drifted in a crosswind to an unmarked area of the lake bed where it was very difficult to judge the height over the ground because of a lack of guidance (the markers provided on the lake bed runway).

Peterson fired the landing rockets to provide additional lift, but he hit the lake bed before the landing gear was fully down and locked. The M2-F2 rolled over six times, coming to rest upside down. Pulled from the vehicle by Jay King and Joseph Huxman, Peterson was rushed to the base hospital, transferred to the March Air Force Base Hospital and then the UCLA Hospital. He recovered but lost vision in his right eye due to a staphylococcal infection.

Portions of M2-F2 footage including Peterson's spectacular crash landing were used for the 1973 television series The Six Million Dollar Man though some shots during the opening credits of the series showed the later HL-10 model, during release from its carrier plane, a modified B-52.

Four pilots flew the M2-F2 on its 16 glide flights. They were Milton O. Thompson (five flights), Bruce Peterson (three flights), Don Sorlie (three flights) and Jerry Gentry (five flights).

NASA pilots and researchers realized the M2-F2 had lateral control problems, even though it had a stability augmentation control system. When the M2-F2 was rebuilt at Dryden and redesignated the M2-F3, it was modified with an additional third vertical fin—centered between the tip fins to improve control characteristics.

The M2-F2/F3 was the first of the heavyweight, entry-configuration lifting bodies. Its successful development as a research test vehicle answered many of the generic questions about these vehicles.

== M2-F2 flights ==
- NASA M2-F2 - NASA 803, 16 unpowered flights

Vehicle Flight #	Date	Pilot	Mach	Velocity (km/h)	Altitude (meters)	Duration	Comments
M2-F2 #1	July 12, 1966	Thompson	0.646	727	13,716	00:03:37	First M2-F2 Flight. Unpowered glide. 320 km/h landing.
M2-F2 #2	July 19, 1966	Thompson	0.598	634	13,716	00:04:05	Unpowered glide. Determination of lateral stability control, longitudinal trim, vehicle performance and landing characteristics.
M2-F2 #3	August 12, 1966	Thompson	0.619	692	13,716	00:04:38	Unpowered glide. Determine effect of increasing Mach number, minimum damper requirements, testing of longitudinal and lateral stability and control.
M2-F2 #4	August 24, 1966	Thompson	0.676	718	13,716	00:04:01	Unpowered glide. Determine control damper requirements, lift-drag ratio, elevon response, flap effectiveness and longitudinal stability and control.
M2-F2 #5	September 2, 1966	Thompson	0.707	750	13,716	00:03:46	Unpowered glide. Evaluate 360 degree overhead approach, determine control damper-off handling qualities.
M2-F2 #6	September 15, 1966	Peterson	0.705	750	13,716	00:03:30	Unpowered glide. Pilot checkout.
M2-F2 #7	September 20, 1966	Sorlie	0.635	678	13,716	00:03:31	Unpowered glide. Pilot checkout.
M2-F2 #8	September 22, 1966	Peterson	0.661	702	13,716	00:03:53	Unpowered glide. Longitudinal and lateral stability and control with dampers.
M2-F2 #9	September 28, 1966	Sorlie	0.672	713	13,716	00:03:53	Unpowered glide. Complete pilot checkout and extend flight envelope.
M2-F2 #10	October 5, 1966	Sorlie	0.615	692	13,716	00:03:45	Unpowered glide. Explore lateral and longitudinal stability and control characteristics with dampers on and off.
M2-F2 #11	October 12, 1966	Gentry	0.662	702	13,716	00:03:54	Unpowered glide. Pilot checkout.
M2-F2 #12	October 26, 1966	Gentry	0.605	642	13,716	00:03:47	Unpowered glide. Obtain stability and control data at 7 and 11 degree attack angles and upper flap effectiveness.
M2-F2 #13	November 14, 1966	Gentry	0.681	716	13,716	00:04:21	Unpowered glide. Test stability and control, determine vehicle performance characteristics.
M2-F2 #14	November 21, 1966	Gentry	0.695	735	13,716	00:03:50	Unpowered glide. Test stability and control, determine vehicle performance characteristics.
M2-F2 #15	May 2, 1967	Gentry	0.623	661	13,716	00:03:51	Unpowered glide.
M2-F2 #16	May 10, 1967	Peterson	0.612	649	13,716	00:03:43	Unpowered glide Crash landing

== Specifications (M2-F2) ==
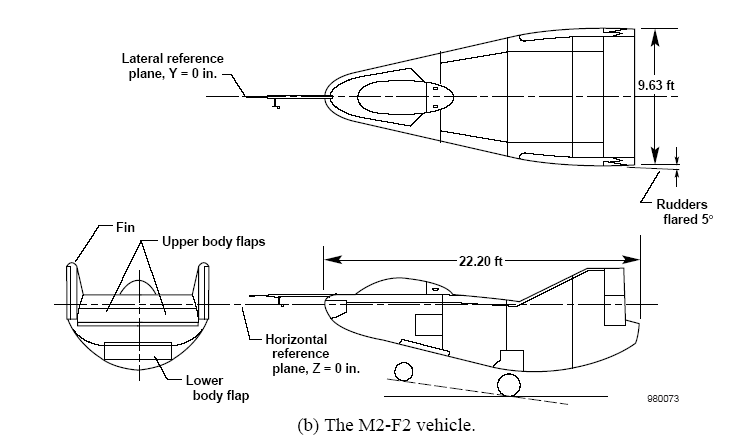
NASA M2-F2 Lifting body diagram

Data from

General characteristics

- Crew: 1
- Length: 22 ft 2 in (6.76 m)
- Wingspan: 9 ft 8 in (2.95 m)
- Height: 9 ft 6 in (2.90 m)
- Wing area: 160 sq ft (15 m^{2})
- Empty weight: 4,620 lb (2,096 kg)
- Gross weight: 6,000 lb (2,722 kg)
- Max takeoff weight: 7,485 lb (3,395 kg)
- Powerplant: 1 × Reaction Motors XLR-11 liquid-fuelled rocket motor, 8,000 lbf (36 kN) thrust with four combustion chamber/nozzle assemblies

Performance

- Maximum speed: 405 kn (466 mph, 750 km/h)
- Maximum speed: Mach 0.707
- Range: 8.6 nmi (9.9 mi, 15.9 km)
- Service ceiling: 45,000 ft (14,000 m)
- Wing loading: 43.2 lb/sq ft (211 kg/m^{2})
- Thrust/weight: 1.3

== See also ==
Aircraft of comparable role, configuration, and era

- X-24
- M2-F1
- M2-F3
- HL-10
