= Donald L. Mallick =

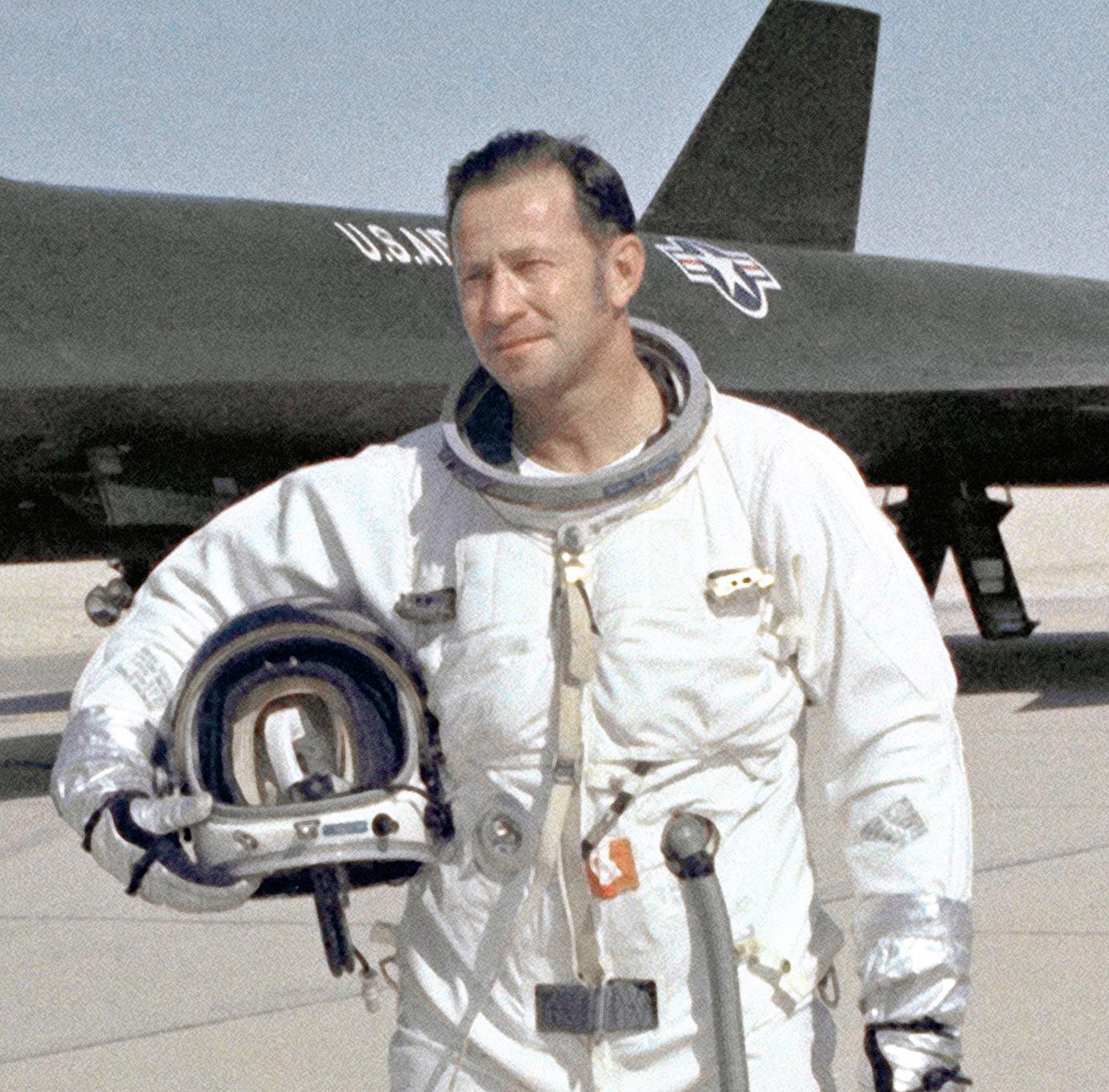
- Born: October 4, 1930 (age 96); Sewickley, Pennsylvania, U.S.
- Education: Penn State; University of Florida, M.S. 1957
- Occupations: Pilot and Administrator
- Space career

NASA Research Pilot
- Rank: Lieutenant Commander, United States Naval Reserve

Donald L. Mallick (born October 4, 1930) is an American former pilot at the NASA Dryden Flight Research Center from 1963 to 1981. He later became the deputy chief for the Dryden Aircraft Operations Division.

== Early life and education ==
Mallick was born on October 4, 1930, in Sewickley, Pennsylvania, a small town near Pittsburgh. He was the second and youngest son of Robert S. Mallick Sr. and Louise Wesche Mallick, both of whom were of German descent.

Louise was born in Germany in 1903, and migrated to the United States in 1907. Robert Sr. was born in Beaver County, Pennsylvania, with his family history going back to the late 1700s, when the family arrived from Germany.

Mallick's older brother, Robert Scott Mallick Jr. was an Army Air Corps flier and a B-24 pilot during World War II, and participated in bomb drops on Germany, taking off from Great Britain's airfields.

Mallick graduated from Neville Twp. High School, Pennsylvania in 1948. He enrolled at Penn State College in the field of Mechanical Engineering. After two years of college, the Korean War interrupted his college education. Mallick had always had a desire to follow on his brother's footsteps and become a pilot. The Korean War provided an opportunity for Mallick to enter flight training. The mandatory WWII draft was still in effect and provided an excellent excuse for Mallick to leave college and follow his desire to become a pilot. Mallick's parents were not pleased with his decision, but his's brother supported him in this endeavor, so Mallick proceeded with attempting to join the United States Air Force.

== Military career ==
Mallick served as a pilot in the US Navy after two years of undergraduate work at Penn State. The Air Force rejected Mallick's application due to his young age of 19.5, since the Air Force requirement for accepting cadets was a minimum age of 20.5 years old. Following USAF's rejection, he walked down the hall of the old Pittsburgh Post Office Building and signed up with the Navy.

Mallick entered Naval Flight Training in September 1950 and graduated as an Ensign and a Naval Fighter Pilot in March 1952.

Mallick married a home town girl, Audrey E. Waite, right upon his graduation from the naval flight training. Shortly thereafter he reported to the Naval Fleet Squadron VF-172, stationed in Jacksonville, Florida. For the next two and a half years, Mallick flew from three different aircraft carriers and served in the European and Pacific theaters.

Mallick was a successful Navy pilot and enjoyed the challenges of his naval aviation career, but it was not conducive to his married life, with extended separations of sea cruises. When Mallick's four-year Navy commitment was up in September 1954, both he and his wife decided it's best for him to leave the active duty part of the service, but remain in the active Navy Reserve, so he could continue flying. At this time, Mallick re-enrolled in school and joined the Aeronautical Engineering Department at the University of Florida.

== College years ==
The next few years at the University of Florida were more comfortable than the first two years at Penn State. Mallick was married, was provided a veterans’ apartment, had a wife who was working, and just gained a new addition to the family - a daughter named Sandra Lee Mallick.

Once a month, Mallick drove to the Jacksonville Navy base, and blew the “cobwebs of study” out of his head by flying the F9F-6 Cougar aircraft as part of his duties in the Navy Reserve. When Mallick showed up at class one day with an almost new Buick, his professor accused him of being a professional student, who could not afford to leave school. Mallick proved this professor wrong when he graduated with honors, in June 1957, from the University of Florida. Immediately afterwards, Mallick was lucky enough to obtain a flying position with what was then called NACA (now NASA), at Langley, Virginia.

== NACA/NASA Langley, VA ==
Mallick first joined NASA's predecessor, the National Advisory Committee for Aeronautics (NACA) in 1957, at the Langley Aeronautical Laboratory (later redesignated Langley Research Center), Hampton, VA, as a research pilot. When Mallick joined the pilot program at Langley in June 1957, it turned into the busiest summer of his career. He was checked out in multiple types of aircraft as soon as he joined NACA, since the NACA office had a lot of different programs in the works, but was short on pilots.

Mallick checked out in new fighter jets, helicopters, multi-engine aircraft, and even some VTOL test aircraft. During that period Mallick participated in numerous Very Short Take Off and Landing (VSTOL) type research programs, including the Vertical Take Off and Landing (VERTOL) VZ-2 aircraft.

He also flew a small amphibian JRF aircraft that carried Fuming Nitric Acid to the launch facility, at Wallops Island, VA. It was a cargo that was not allowed to go through the tunnels, under Hampton Roads, and had to be delivered by air. The testing performed at now NASA Langley was primarily investigating and improving aircraft stability and handling qualities. Mallick conducted three programs that were considered of “national interest” —meaning other aviation organizations and the country would use the results:

1. The F-86D wing shaker program - It took two years to prepare the aircraft, and three months to fly the program. It was an investigation of structural wing response to installed wing shakers, and the aircraft dynamics of high subsonic Mach flight .9 Mach. Large physical inputs at various frequencies were introduced to the wings, via the shaker weights installed. Some conditions resulted in so much aircraft motion that the instrument panel could not be read by the pilot.
2. The F8U-3 Sonic Boom Program – NASA's first program to document the nature and strength of sonic booms that reached the ground. The F8U-3 was the highest performance fighter of that time, and runs were made to 60,000 feet and Mach 2.0. This was Mallick's introduction to flying in a pressure suit.
3. A ground-based confinement simulation of the trip to the Moon - NASA had contracted with Martin-Marietta to provide a simulation study, to determine if there were any problems with three astronauts flying to the Moon, in a confined environment of a space capsule. Two NASA Research Pilots from other Centers joined Mallick in this study. Complex memory tests were conducted during the simulation, along with flying many of the required maneuvers on an active flight panel. The Moon landing capsule was set up in a large darkened room, and a simulated mission lasted for one week. The results indicated that there were no major psychological problems with the crew. Performance of tasks did not decay with time, and crew easily adapted to sleep cycles based on crew on duty times. The information gained was used in support of the upcoming effort to send astronauts to the Moon.

During the 1957-1963 timeframe, Mallick's assignments changed to involve more of a helicopter/ VSTOL type operation. In addition, NASA Langley had been assigned the duties of flying the headquarters administrator's airplane, a Convair 240. For Mallick, it meant a lot of commercial airline-type flying, with significant time away from home. In 1962, Mallick spent more than thirty percent of his time away from home and family, which prompted him to transfer to NASA Edwards in 1963, when such an opportunity came up. Mallick took that opportunity mainly because his family now had two additional members – sons Donald Karl Mallick and David Glenn Mallick.

== NASA Dryden, Edwards AFB, CA ==
Mallick was a research pilot with NASA Dryden (now Armstrong) Flight Research Center from 1963 until 1981. He later became Deputy Chief for the Dryden Aircraft Operations Division, serving in a management position with some limited research and support flying.

When Mallick joined NASA's Dryden Flight Research Center at Edwards Air Force Base in 1963, it was at the peak of flight testing, including rocket powered aircraft, and all of the latest developments from that era. Mallick was initially assigned to the Lockheed JetStar Prop-Fan, which flew numerous test programs for over twenty years, as well as Laminar Flow Wing programs. One of JetStar's major programs was developing the Microwave ILS used for the Space Shuttle's landings and recoveries.

In the summer of 1964, Mallick enrolled at the USAF Test Pilot School (TPS), located at Edwards Air Force Base near NASA. He completed the six month TPS program and returned to Dryden to continue with his duties. Over the years at Dryden, Mallick participated in dozens of programs, but the three of “national interest” were:

1. LLRV (Lunar Landing Research Vehicle), a Project Apollo era program to build a simulator for the Moon landings,
2. XB-70, a prototype version of the planned B-70 nuclear-armed, deep-penetration strategic bomber, designed in the late 1950s by North American Aviation (NAA). The six-engined Valkyrie was capable of cruising for thousands of miles at Mach 3+ while flying at 70,000 feet (21,000 m), and
3. NASA YF-12 Blackbird program, which following its retirement by the USAF, served as a research aircraft for NASA to develop several significant improvements for future supersonic aircraft. NASA YG-12 program lasted almost ten years with numerous tests conducted – AWACS control of supersonic aircraft, Cooperative Airframe-Propulsion Control System (CAPCS), Central Airborne Performance Analyzer (CAPA) that relayed engine data to the pilots, structures, heating, stability and control, etc.

During the mid-1960s Mallick was the chief project pilot on NASA's Lunar Landing Research Vehicle (LLRV). The LLRV helped develop the piloting procedures that were used during the final portions of the lunar landings.

Mallick made a flight in NASA's lightweight M2-F1 Lifting Body on January 30, 1964.

In 1965, a fourth and final child was added to the family - son Darren Kent Mallick.

In August 1967, Mallick was promoted to Chief Pilot of NASA Dryden (now Armstrong) Flight Research Center. He was project pilot on the YF-12 and XB-70A research programs of the late 1960s and 1970s.

After he was promoted later in his career, he oversaw the different flight test programs at Dryden, was responsible for the safety of the pilots, as well as for a successful completion of the various test programs. Mallick served 17 years as a NASA Chief Pilot.

In 1984, Mallick was promoted to Deputy Chief of Dryden's Aircraft Operations Division. He served in this position until his retirement in 1987.

Mallick had accumulated over 11,000 flight hours in 125 different aircraft.

== Awards and honors ==
NAVY:

- National Defense Service Medal
- United Nations Medal
- China Service Ribbons
- Navy Occupation (European Clasp)
- Korean Service Medals

NASA:

- NASA Superior Performance Award - 1968
- Commendation for Performance GPAS Flight Test - 1973
- Selected “FELLOW” in SETP Organization - 1975
- YF-12 Group Achievement Flight Test - 1976
- ALT Inert Flight Test Team Award - 1977
- JetStar Flight Test Team Award - 1977
- YF-12 Propulsion Research Team Group Achievement - 1978
- Monetary Award for Performance as member of SES - 1980
- Langley Special Achievement Award - 1986
- Honoree at City of Lancaster “Aviation Walk of Honor” - 2000
- NASA biography book “ The Smell of Kerosene” - 2004
- Cornell High School “Wall of Honor” - 2010

== Retirement years ==
In 1972, Mallick officially retired from the Navy Reserves after achieving the rank of lieutenant commander.

In his spare time, Mallick prepared a family history book, which is currently in the possession of his family.

During his time at NASA, Mallick was asked to assist in publishing a book about his flying history, called The Smell of Kerosene. The book preparation took several years, and was published by NASA in 2004.

After his retirement, Mallick worked three years as a volunteer for the Lancaster Senior's Group, overseeing “Meals on Wheels” and “Dial a Ride” programs for local seniors.

He also worked as a volunteer tax preparer for the AARP/IRS income tax preparation program for eighteen years, serving seniors and lower income citizens.

Over the years, upon NASA's request, Mallick participated in a number of reviews and historical aviation briefings at NASA.
