= Milton Orville Thompson =

American aviator (1926–1993)

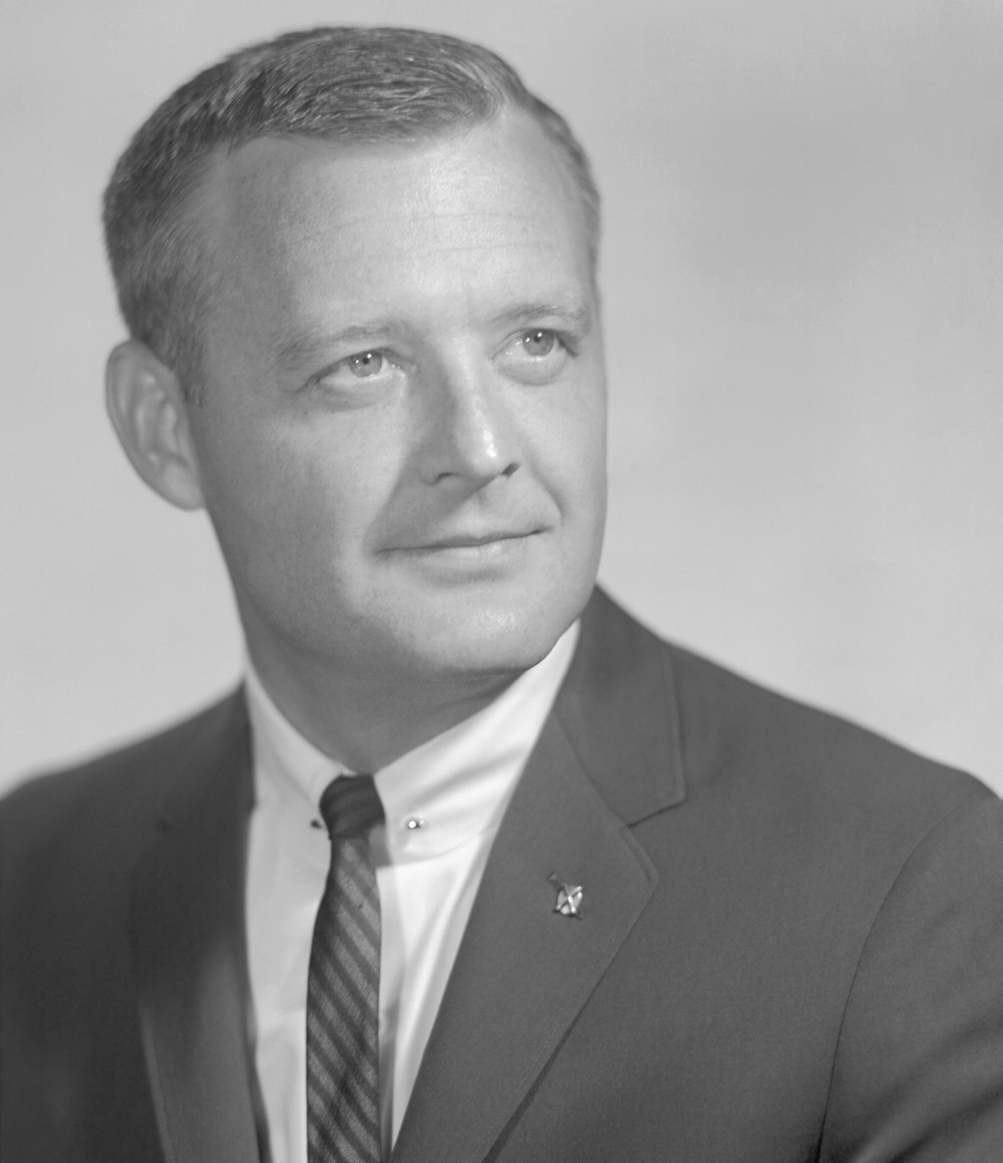
- Born: Milton Orville Thompson; May 4, 1926; Crookston, Minnesota, U.S.
- Died: August 6, 1993 (aged 67); Lancaster, California, U.S.
- Other name: Milt Thompson
- Education: University of Washington (BS, 1953)
- Occupations: Naval aviator; Test pilot
- Awards: NASA Distinguished Service Medal
- Space career

USAF / NASA Test pilot
- Rank: Lieutenant Commander; United States Naval Reserve

Milton Orville Thompson (May 4, 1926 – August 6, 1993), (Lt Cmdr, USNR), better known as Milt Thompson, was an American naval officer, aviator, engineer, and NASA research pilot. He was one of twelve pilots who flew the North American X-15, an experimental spaceplane jointly operated by the United States Air Force and NASA.

Following his involvement with the X-15 program, Thompson became Chief Engineer and Director of Research Projects at the NASA Dryden Flight Research Center.

== Early life and education ==
Born in Crookston, Minnesota, on May 4, 1926, to parents Peter Thompson (1898–1960) and Alma Theresa Thompson (née Evenson; 1898–1977). Thompson began flying with the U.S. Navy as a pilot trainee at age 19. He served in China and Japan during World War II.

Following six years of active Naval service, Thompson entered the University of Washington, in Seattle, Washington. He graduated with a Bachelor of Science degree in Engineering in 1953. He remained in the Naval Reserve during college and continued flying, in Navy aircraft and in crop dusters and forest-spraying aircraft, eventually receiving the rank of lieutenant commander.

After graduating, Thompson became a flight test engineer for the Boeing Aircraft Company in Seattle. During his two years at Boeing, he flew on the sister aircraft of Dryden's B-52B air-launch vehicle.

Thompson was married to Therese Beytebiere; they had one daughter named Brett and four sons.

Thompson's parents were Peter Thompson and Alma T. Thompson; his siblings were Adeline, Fay and Janice.

== Test pilot ==
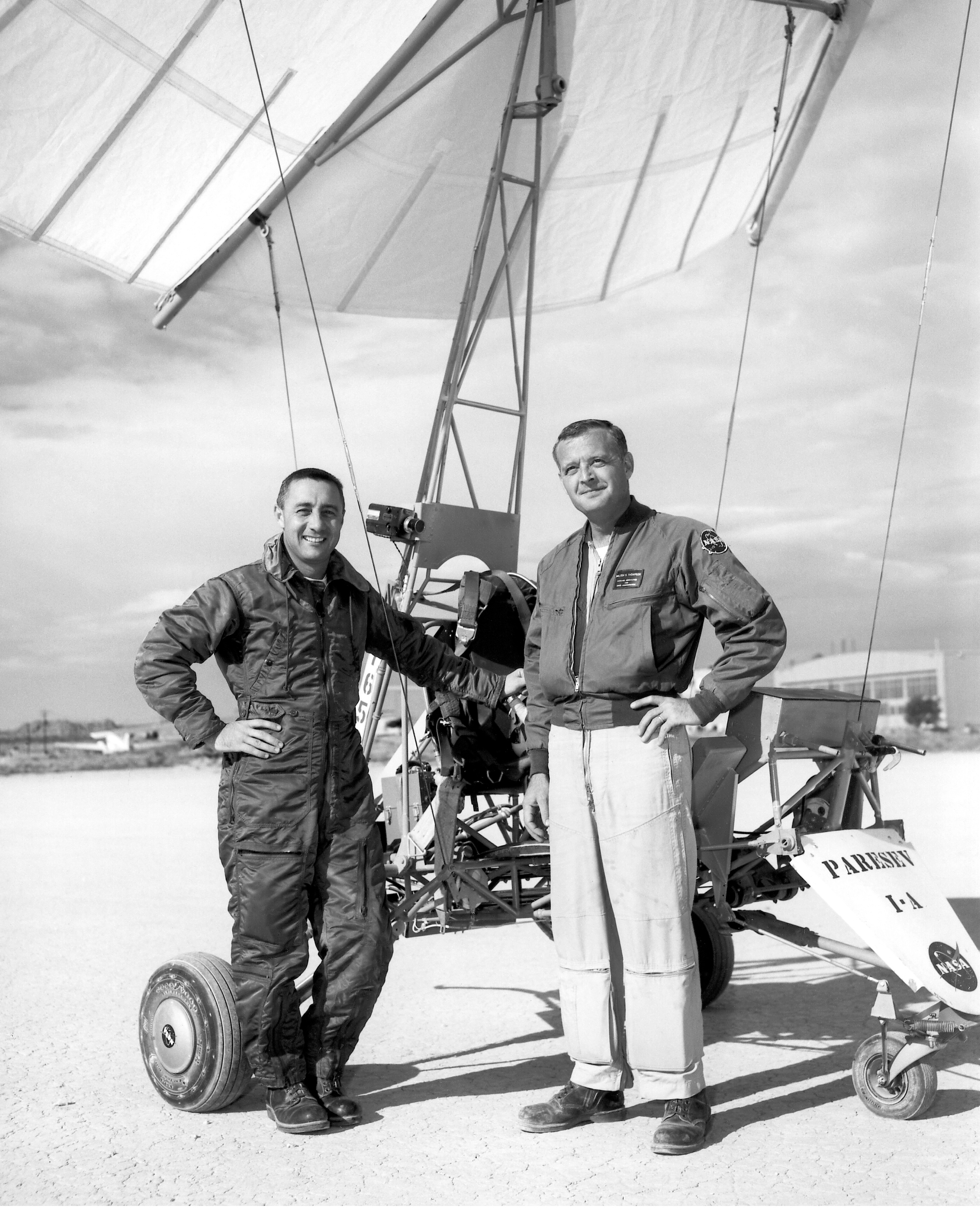
Thompson (right) with NASA astronaut Gus Grissom and the NASA Paresev

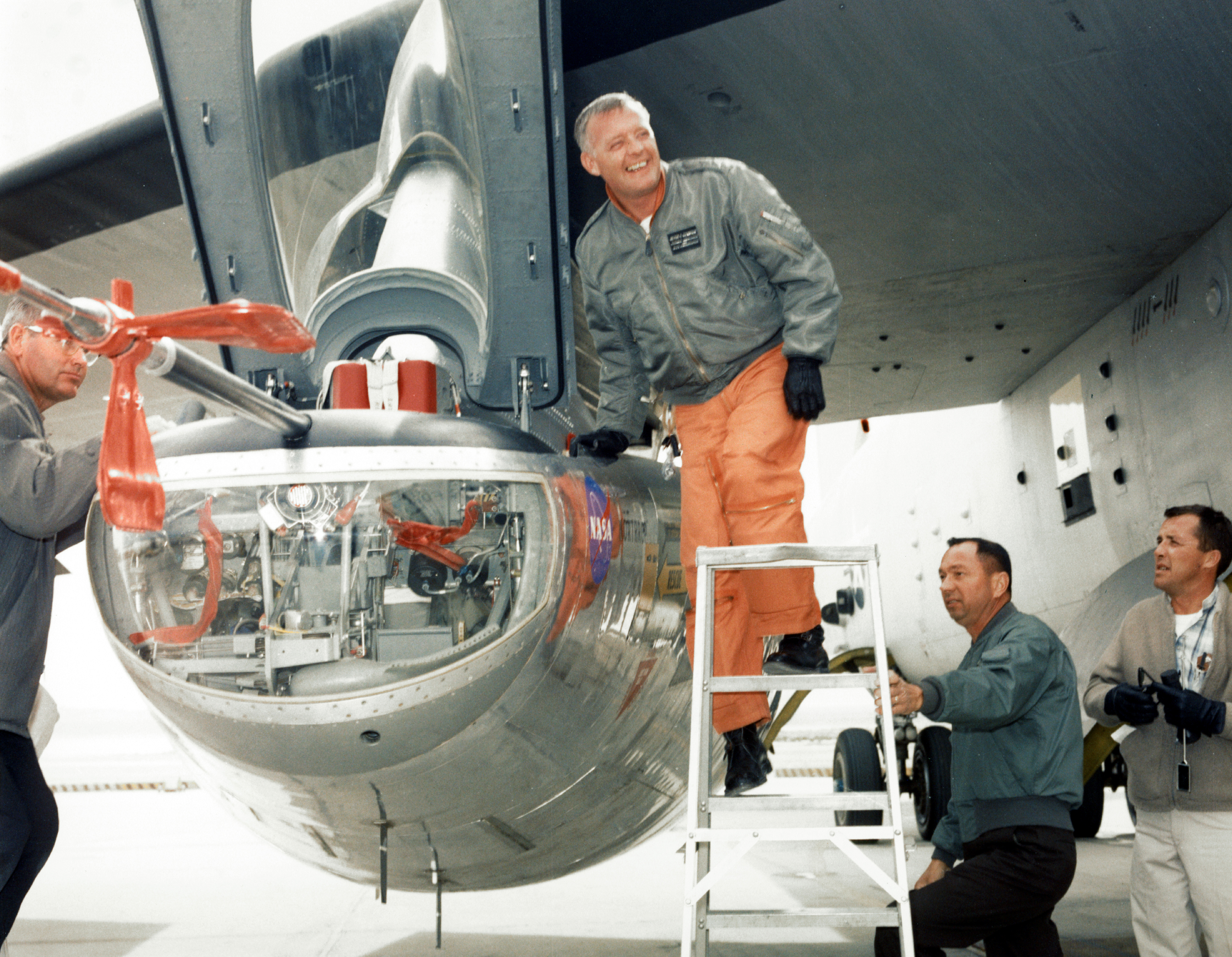
Thompson (center) and the M2-F2 Lifting Body

Thompson was hired as an engineer at the flight research facility on March 19, 1956, when it was still under the auspices of the National Advisory Committee for Aeronautics (NACA). He became a research pilot in January 1958.

On August 16, 1963, Thompson became the first person to fly a lifting body, the lightweight NASA M2-F1. The plywood and steel-tubing prototype was flown as a glider after being released from an R4D tow plane. He flew it a total of 47 times, and also made the first five flights of the all-metal Northrop M2-F2 lifting body, beginning July 12, 1966.

Lifting bodies were wingless vehicles designed to generate lift and aerodynamic stability from the shape of their bodies. They were flown at Dryden to study and validate the concept of safely maneuvering and landing a low lift-over-drag vehicle designed for reentry from space. Data from the program helped in the development of the Space Shuttle.

Thompson was also one of the 12 NASA, Air Force, and Navy pilots to fly the North American X-15 rocket-powered research aircraft between 1959 and 1968. He began flying X-15s on October 29, 1963, only 74 days after his first Lifting Body flight. He flew the aircraft 14 times during the following two years, reaching a maximum speed of 3,712 mph (Mach 5.48) and a peak altitude of 214,100 feet on separate flights.

The X-15 program provided a wealth of data on aerodynamics, thermodynamics, propulsion, flight controls, and the physiological aspects of high-speed, high-altitude flight.

Thompson was one of an elite group of eight pilots who tested the paraglider research vehicle NASA Paresev.

In 1962 the U.S. Air Force selected Thompson to be the only civilian test pilot to fly in the X-20 Dyna-Soar program that was intended to launch a human into Earth orbit and recover with a horizontal ground landing. The program was canceled before construction of the vehicle began.

== Administrator ==
Thompson was also a member of NASA's Space Transportation System Technology Steering Committee during the 1970s. In this role he led the effort to design the Orbiters for power-off landings rather than increase weight with air-breathing engines for airliner-type landings. His committee work earned him NASA's highest award, the Distinguished Service Medal.

Thompson concluded his active flying career in 1967, becoming Chief of Research Projects two years later. In 1975 he was appointed Chief Engineer and retained the position until his death on August 6, 1993, at the age of 67. On the day of his death, Thompson was scheduled to be honored at a NASA dinner. The award dinner proceeded as a memorial to Thompson. The cause of Thompson's death was not released, except to say he became acutely ill that day and died.

== Awards ==
Thompson was a member of the Society of Experimental Test Pilots, and received the organization's Iven C. Kincheloe Award as the Outstanding Experimental Test Pilot of 1966 for his research flights in the M2 lifting bodies. He also received the 1967 Octave Chanute Award from the American Institute of Aeronautics and Astronautics (AIAA) for his lifting-body research.

The National Aeronautic Association named Thompson as one of its 1990 "Elder Statesman of Aviation". This distinction, given since 1955, highlights contributions "of significant value over a period of years" in the field of aeronautics.

Thompson wrote several technical papers, was a member of NASA's Senior Executive Service, and received several NASA awards. His 1992 book, At the Edge of Space described the X-15 flight program. In 1993 he was inducted into the Aerospace Walk of Honor.

== Bibliography ==
- Thompson, Milton O. (1992). At The Edge Of Space: The X-15 Flight Program, Smithsonian Institution Press, Washington and London. ISBN 1-56098-107-5
- Thompson, Milton O. (1999). Flying Without Wings: NASA Lifting Bodies and the Birth of the Space Shuttle, Smithsonian Institution Press, Washington and London. ISBN 978-1-56098-832-8
