= John A. Manke =

American test pilot and aerospace engineer (1931–2019)

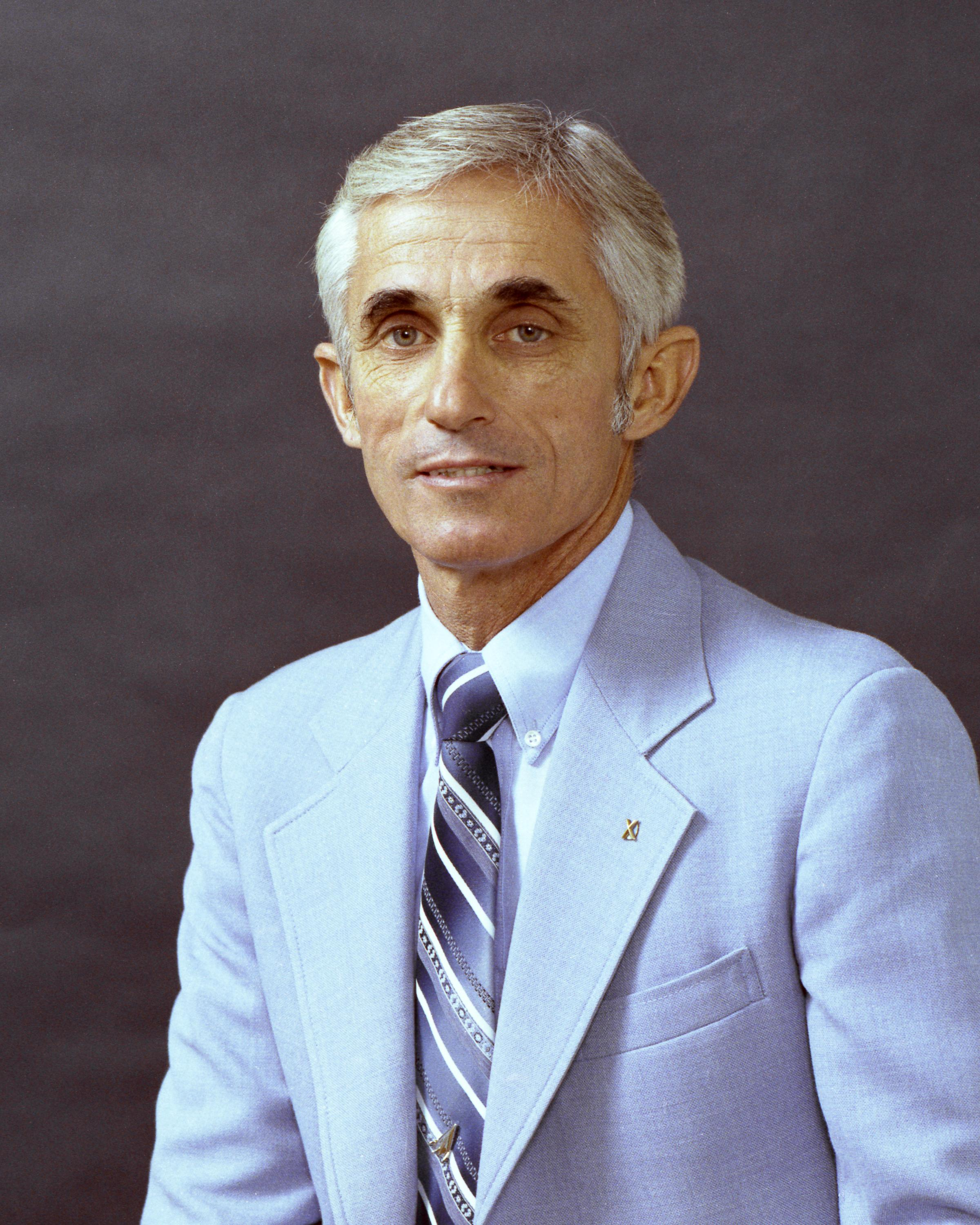
- Official portrait, 1978
- Born: November 13, 1931; Selby, South Dakota, U.S.
- Died: January 31, 2019 (aged 87); Lancaster, California, U.S.
- Education: Marquette University (BS)
- Occupations: Pilot; aerospace engineer
- Years active: 1956–1984
- Spouse: Marilyn Manke
- Awards: NASA Exceptional Service Medal

John Arnold Manke Sr. (November 13, 1931 – January 31, 2019) was an American test pilot and aerospace engineer. He was the first person to achieve supersonic flight in a lifting body and first to land a lifting body on a runway. He was director of NASA's Dryden Flight Research Center from 1981 to 1984.

== Early life ==
Manke was born in Selby, South Dakota, United States, on November 13, 1931. He attended the University of South Dakota before entering military service in 1951, serving in the U.S. Navy. He later studied electrical engineering at Marquette University in Milwaukee, where he participated in the Naval Reserve Officers Training Corps program and graduated in 1956.

== Career ==
After graduating from Marquette, Manke served as a United States Marine Corps fighter pilot, leaving in 1960 as a major in the Marine Corps Reserve. Subsequently, he worked as a test engineer at Honeywell Aerospace before joining NASA's Flight Research Center at Edwards Air Force Base on May 25, 1962.

At NASA, Manke first worked as a flight research engineer and later as a research pilot. His assignments in the Pilots' Office included the Lockheed F-104 Starfighter, Douglas F5D Skylancer, General Dynamics F-16 Fighting Falcon, General Dynamics F-111 Aardvark, and Douglas C-47 Skytrain.

Manke served as a North American X-15 flight planner and completed X-15 ground school with Michael J. Adams. Together, they conducted a test run of the Reaction Motors XLR99 engine at the Rocket Engine Test Facility. He left the X-15 program in 1967 after Adams was killed in an accident during the third X-15 flight.

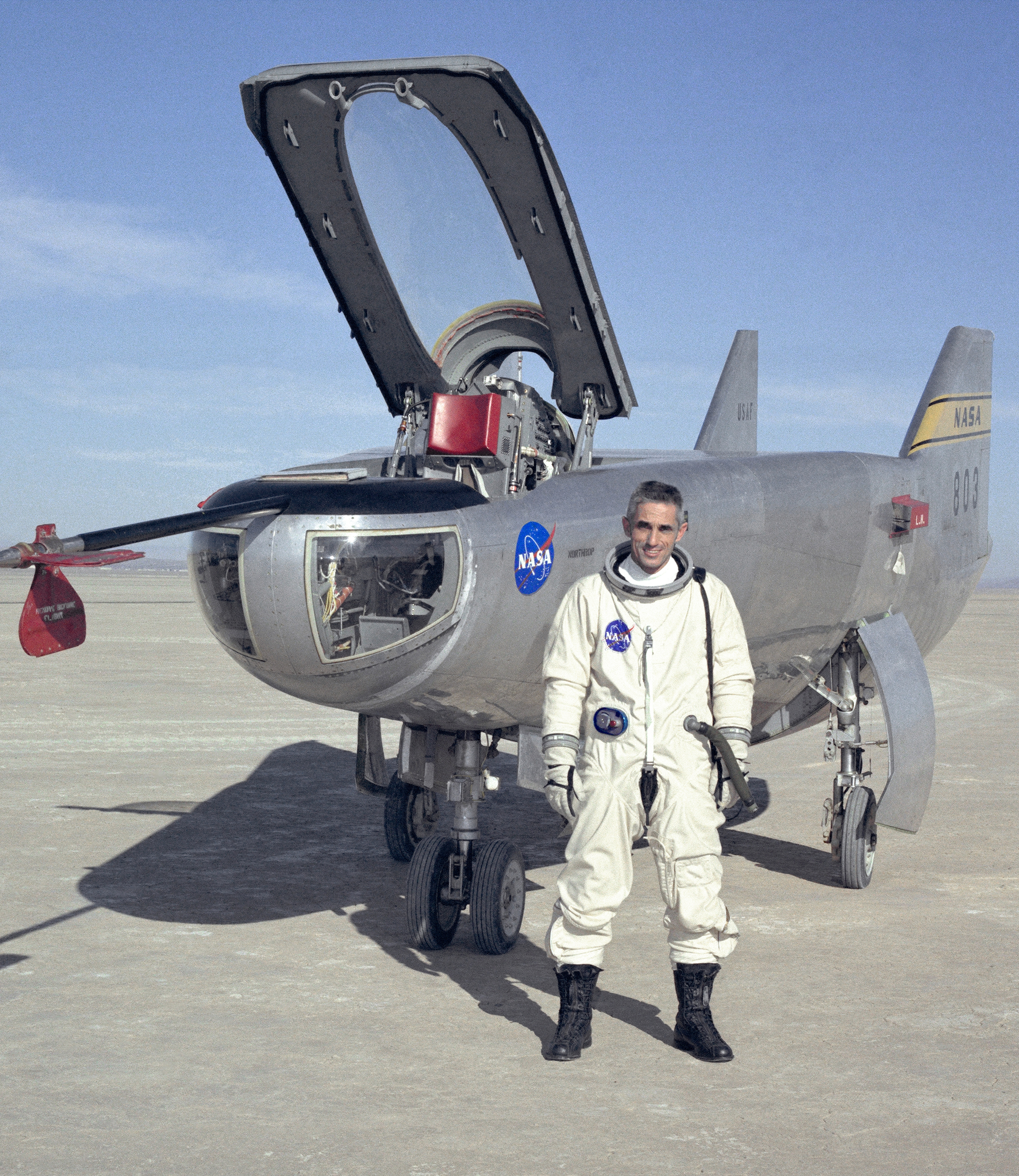
Manke with M2-F3 lifting body in 1972

In 1968, he began piloting rocket-powered wingless lifting bodies optimized for spaceflight. He became the first person to attain supersonic speed in a lifting body on May 9, 1969, during his test flight of a Northrop HL-10. Manke also flew the Martin Marietta X-24 and Northrop M2-F3 a record 42 times. His precision unpowered landing during a test flight of the X-24B at Edwards Air Force Base on August 5, 1975, demonstrated that lifting bodies could be landed on runways, influencing design engineers of the Space Shuttle to forego jet engines, initially intended to aid shuttle landing approaches. He also flew exploratory flights in the fly-by-wire Vought F-8 Crusader to develop control system design changes for the space shuttle.

Manke became facility manager and chief of flight operations at Dryden, and later at Ames Research Center when the two NASA centers were integrated. He served as director of flight operations at Dryden and Ames from October 1, 1981, until his retirement on April 27, 1984.

He participated in technology development for programs including the Boeing 747 Shuttle Carrier, X-15, Northrop B-2 Spirit, and Grumman X-29. In total, Manke flew 4,500 hours in 56 different aircraft. He earned his Mach 3+ pin flying the Lockheed YF-12 Blackbird.

== Notable test flights ==
Flight data is drawn from Reed and Lister.

No.	Date	Vehicle	Flight No.	Max Speed (kph)	Mach	Max Altitude (km)	Flight Time	Notes
6	May 9, 1969	HL-10	Flight 17	1,197	1.00	16.25	6m 50s	First supersonic flight of a lifting body
11	October 22, 1969	X-24A	Flight 6	623	0.51	12.19	3m 58s	First glide flight
20	March 29, 1971	X-24A	Flight 25	1,667	1.36	21.49	7m 26s	Fastest X-24A flight
25	November 21, 1972	M2-F3	Flight 39	1,524	1.24	20.33	6m 17s	Fastest M2-F3 flight
37	November 15, 1974	X-24B	Flight 45	1,722	1.41	21.96	8m 1s	Fastest X-24B flight
42	August 5, 1975	X-24B	Flight 55	1,381	1.13	18.29	7m 0s	First controlled landing of a lifting body

== Awards ==
- NASA Outstanding Leadership Medal (1978)
- NASA Exceptional Service Medal
- Presidential Rank Award of Meritorious Executive (1984)
- Aerospace Walk of Honor (1997)

== Personal life ==
He married Marilyn Manke in 1954, and the couple lived together in Lancaster, California. They were married for 65 years and had 5 children.

Manke was Catholic and served as eucharistic minister for Lancaster's Sacred Heart Parish. He flew lightweight aircraft and gliders of his own construction. He belonged to the Society of Experimental Test Pilots.

He died in Lancaster in 2019, aged 87.

== Gallery ==
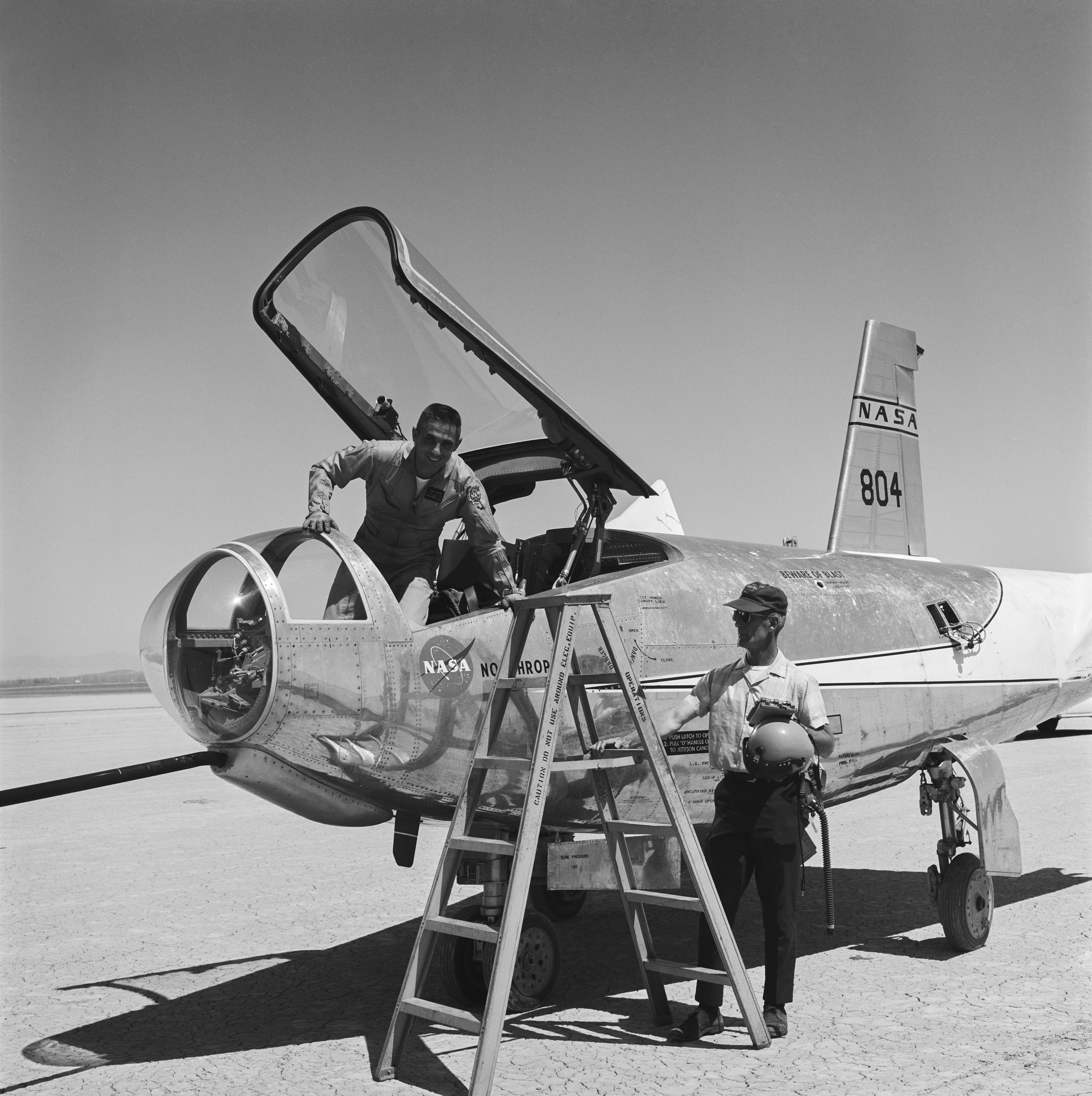

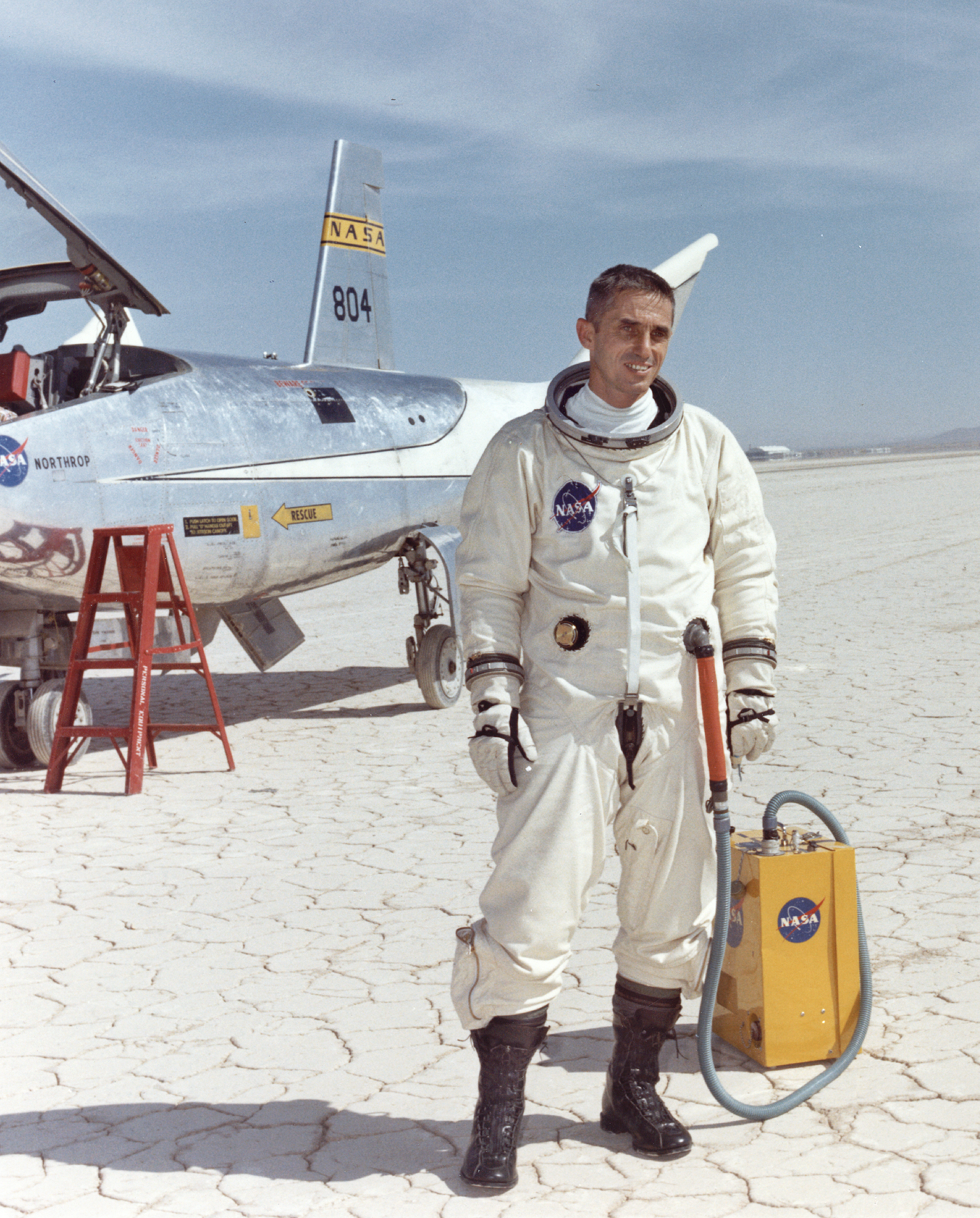

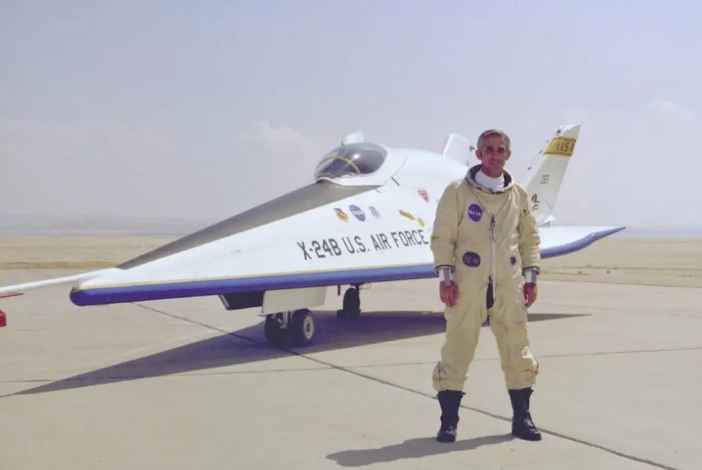
