= Chanute =

Chanute may refer to:

- Chanute, Kansas, United States
  - Chanute High School
- Octave Chanute (1832–1910), American civil engineer and aviation pioneer
- Chanute Air Force Base, Illinois, United States
- Octave Chanute Award, awarded by the Western Society of Engineers since 1901
- Chanute Flight Award, awarded by the American Institute of Aeronautics and Astronautics (between 1939 and 2005)
- Chanute Air Museum
- Chanute (baseball team)
