= Northrop M2-F3 =

Lifting body prototype aircraft

M2-F3
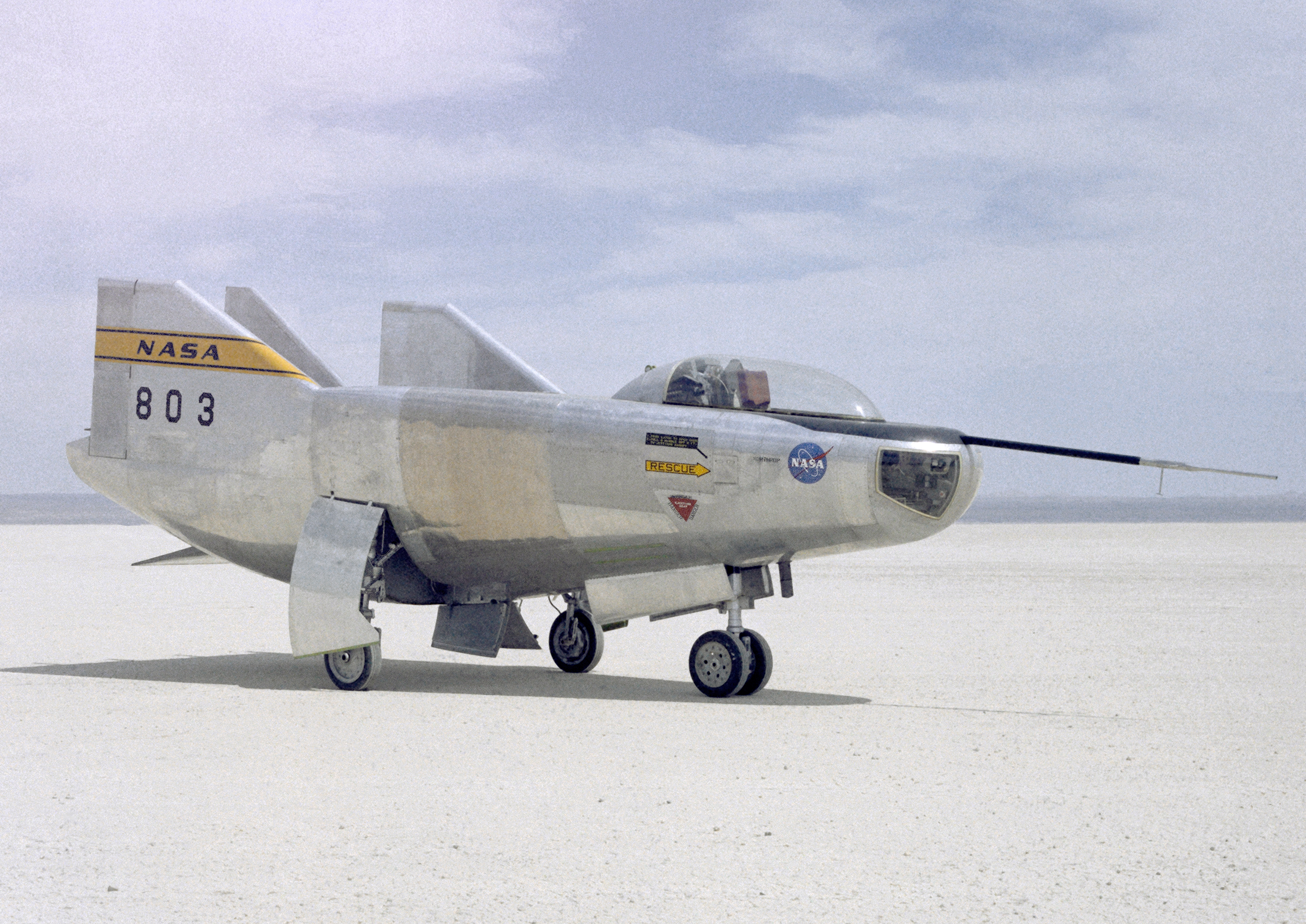

General information
- Type: Lifting body technology demonstrator
- Manufacturer: Northrop
- Status: Donated to the Smithsonian Institution, currently on display at the National Air and Space Museum
- Primary user: NASA

History
- First flight: 2 June 1970
- Retired: 20 December 1972
- Developed from: NASA M2-F1; Northrop M2-F2

The Northrop M2-F3 is a heavyweight lifting body rebuilt from the Northrop M2-F2 after it crashed at the Dryden Flight Research Center in 1967. It was modified with an additional third vertical fin—centered between the tip fins—to improve control characteristics. The "M" refers to "manned" and "F" refers to "flight" version.

== Development ==
Early flight testing of the M2-F1 and M2-F2 lifting body reentry configurations had validated the concept of piloted lifting body reentry from space. When the M2-F2 crashed on May 10, 1967, valuable information had already been obtained and was contributing to new designs.

NASA pilots said the M2-F2 had lateral control problems, so when the M2-F2 was rebuilt at Northrop and redesignated the M2-F3, it was modified with an additional third vertical fin—centered between the tip fins—to improve control characteristics.

After a three-year-long redesign and rebuilding effort, the M2-F3 was ready to fly. The May 1967 crash of the M2-F2 had torn off the left fin and landing gear. It had also damaged the external skin and internal structure. Flight Research Center engineers worked with Ames Research Center and the Air Force in redesigning the vehicle with a center fin to provide greater stability. At first, it seemed that the vehicle had been irreparably damaged, but the original manufacturer, Northrop, did the repair work and returned the redesigned M2-F3 with a center fin for stability to the FRC.

While the M2-F3 was still demanding to fly, the center fin eliminated the high risk of pilot-induced oscillation (PIO) that was characteristic of the M2-F2.

== Operational history ==
The first flight of the M2-F3, with NASA pilot Bill Dana at the controls, was June 2, 1970. The modified vehicle exhibited much better lateral stability and control characteristics than before, and only three glide flights were necessary before the first powered flight on November 25, 1970. The 100th flight of the heavy-weight lifting bodies was completed on October 5, 1972, with pilot Bill Dana soaring to an altitude of 66,300 feet (20,200 m) and a Mach number of 1.370 (about 904 miles per hour (1,455 km/h)) in the M2-F3. Over its 27 missions, the M2-F3 reached a top speed of 1,064 mph (1,712 km/h) (Mach 1.6). The highest altitude reached by the vehicle was 71,500 feet (20,790 m) during its last flight on December 20, 1972, with NASA pilot John A. Manke at the controls.

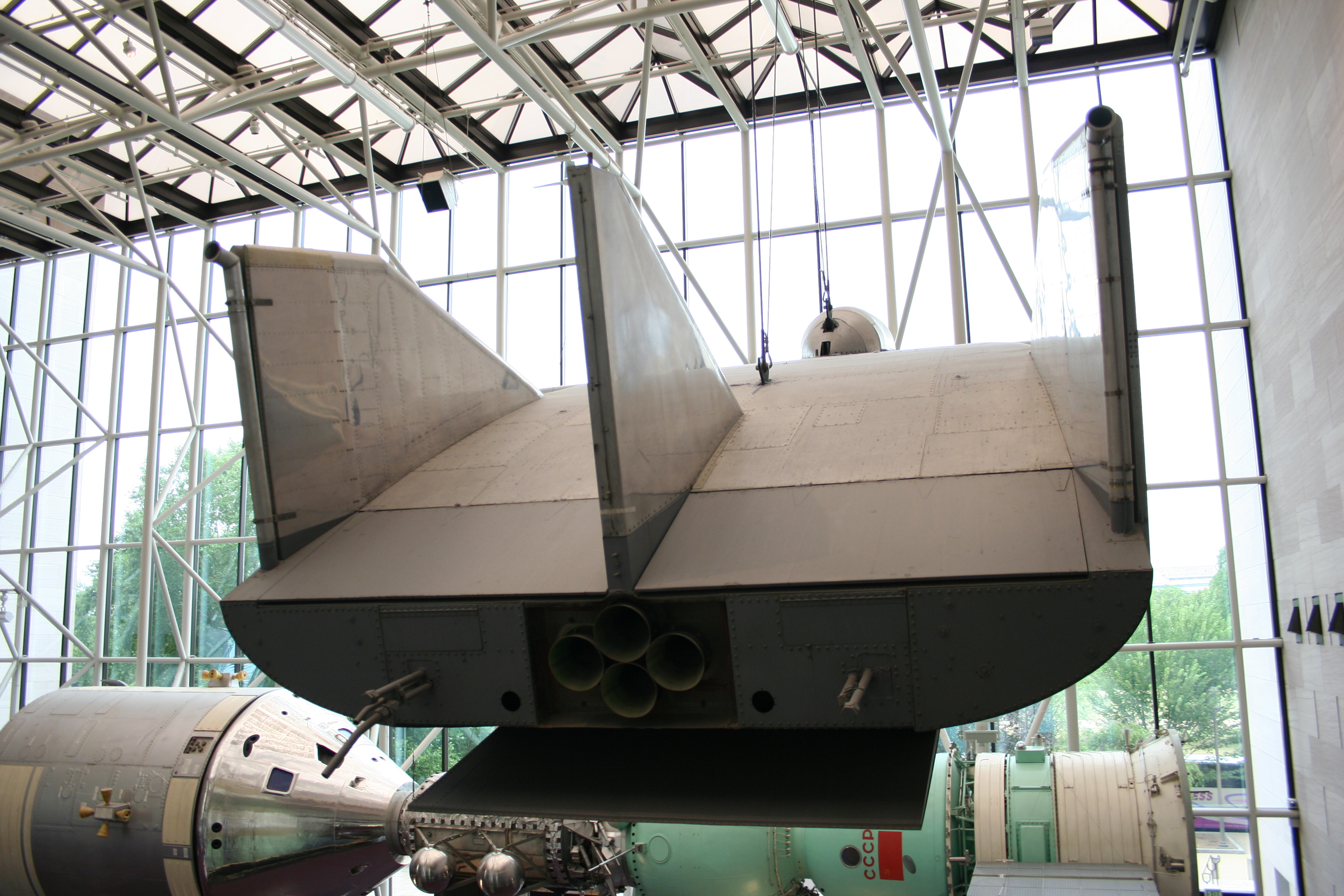
The M2-F3 at the National Air and Space Museum

A reaction control thruster (RCT) system, similar to that on orbiting spacecraft, was also installed to obtain research data about their effectiveness for vehicle control. As the M2-F3's portion of the lifting body program neared an end, it evaluated a rate command augmentation control system, and a side control stick similar to side-stick controllers now used on many modern aircraft.

NASA donated the M2-F3 vehicle to the Smithsonian Institution in December 1973. It is currently on display in the Steven F. Udvar-Hazy Center, outside the James S. McDonnell Space Hangar where the Space Shuttle Discovery is housed.

- M2-F3 pilots
  - William H. Dana: 19 flights
  - John A. Manke: 4 flights
  - Cecil W. Powell: 3 flights
  - Jerauld R. Gentry: 1 flight

=== Aircraft serial number ===
- NASA M2-F3: NASA 803, 27 flights

== M2-F3 flights ==
| Vehicle Flight # | Date | Pilot | Mach | Velocity (km/h) | Altitude | | Duration | Comments |
| Vehicle Flight # | Date | Pilot | Mach | Velocity (km/h) | ft | m | Duration | Comments |
|---|---|---|---|---|---|---|---|---|
| M2-F3 #1 | June 2, 1970 | Dana | 0.688 | 755 | 45,000 | 14,000 | 00:03:38 | First M2-F3 Flight; Unpowered glide |
| M2-F3 #2 | July 21, 1970 | Dana | 0.660 | 708 | 45,000 | 14,000 | 00:03:48 | Unpowered glide |
| M2-F3 #3 | November 2, 1970 | Dana | 0.630 | 690 | 45,000 | 14,000 | 00:03:56 | Unpowered glide |
| M2-F3 #4 | November 25, 1970 | Dana | 0.809 | 859 | 51,900 | 15,800 | 00:06:17 | 1st powered flight |
| M2-F3 #5 | February 9, 1971 | Gentry | 0.707 | 755 | 45,000 | 14,000 | 00:04:01 | - |
| M2-F3 #6 | February 26, 1971 | Dana | 0.773 | 821 | 45,000 | 14,000 | 00:05:48 | Only 2 chambers lit |
| M2-F3 #7 | July 23, 1971 | Dana | 0.930 | 988 | 60,500 | 18,400 | 00:05:53 | - |
| M2-F3 #8 | August 9, 1971 | Dana | 0.974 | 1,035 | 62,000 | 19,000 | 00:06:55 | - |
| M2-F3 #9 | August 25, 1971 | Dana | 1.095 | 1,164 | 67,300 | 20,500 | 00:06:30 | 1st supersonic flight |
| M2-F3 #10 | September 24, 1971 | Dana | 0.728 | 772 | 42,000 | 13,000 | 00:03:30 | Engine fire |
| M2-F3 #11 | November 15, 1971 | Dana | 0.739 | 784 | 45,000 | 14,000 | 00:03:35 | - |
| M2-F3 #12 | December 1, 1971 | Dana | 1.274 | 1,357 | 70,800 | 21,600 | 00:06:31 | - |
| M2-F3 #13 | December 16, 1971 | Dana | 0.811 | 861 | 46,800 | 14,300 | 00:07:31 | Only 2 chambers lit |
| M2-F3 #14 | July 25, 1972 | Dana | 0.989 | 1,049 | 60,900 | 18,600 | 00:07:00 | - |
| M2-F3 #15 | August 11, 1972 | Gentry | 1.101 | 1,168 | 67,200 | 20,500 | 00:06:15 | - |
| M2-F3 #16 | August 24, 1972 | Dana | 1.266 | 1,344 | 66,700 | 20,300 | 00:06:16 | - |
| M2-F3 #17 | September 12, 1972 | Dana | 0.880 | 935 | 46,000 | 14,000 | 00:06:27 | Small engine fire |
| M2-F3 #18 | September 27, 1972 | Dana | 1.340 | 1,424 | 66,700 | 20,300 | 00:06:07 | - |
| M2-F3 #19 | October 5, 1972 | Dana | 1.370 | 1,455 | 66,300 | 20,200 | 00:06:16 | 100th lifting body flight |
| M2-F3 #20 | October 19, 1972 | Manke | 0.905 | 961 | 47,100 | 14,400 | 00:05:59 | - |
| M2-F3 #21 | November 1, 1972 | Manke | 1.213 | 1,292 | 71,300 | 21,700 | 00:06:18 | - |
| M2-F3 #22 | November 9, 1972 | Powell | 0.906 | 961 | 46,800 | 14,300 | 00:06:04 | - |
| M2-F3 #23 | November 21, 1972 | Manke | 1.435 | 1,524 | 66,700 | 20,300 | 00:06:17 | Planned Rosamond; Lakebed landing |
| M2-F3 #24 | November 29, 1972 | Powell | 1.348 | 1,432 | 67,500 | 20,600 | 00:05:57 | - |
| M2-F3 #25 | December 6, 1972 | Powell | 1.191 | 1,265 | 68,300 | 20,800 | 00:05:32 | Planned Rosamond; Lakebed landing |
| M2-F3 #26 | December 13, 1972 | Dana | 1.613 | 1,712 | 66,700 | 20,300 | 00:06:23 | Fastest flight |
| M2-F3 #27 | December 20, 1972 | Manke | 1.294 | 1,378 | 71,500 | 21,800 | 00:06:30 | Highest flight Last M2-F3 flight |

== Specifications (M2-F3) ==
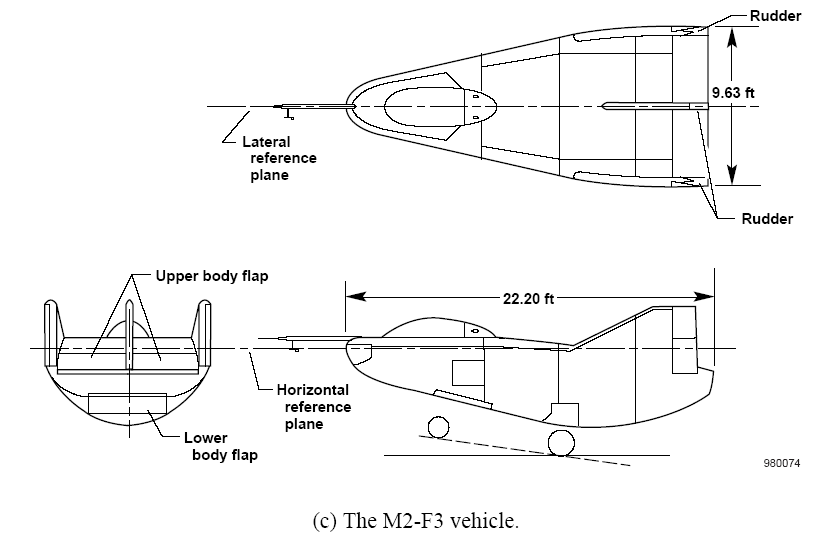
NASA M2-F3 Lifting Body Diagram

Data from

General characteristics

- Crew: 1
- Length: 22 ft 2 in (6.76 m)
- Wingspan: 9 ft 8 in (2.95 m)
- Height: 9 ft 6 in (2.90 m)
- Wing area: 160 sq ft (15 m^{2})
- Empty weight: 5,071 lb (2,300 kg)
- Gross weight: 6,000 lb (2,722 kg)
- Max takeoff weight: 7,937 lb (3,600 kg)
- Powerplant: 1 × Reaction Motors XLR-11 liquid-fuelled rocket motor, 8,000 lbf (36 kN) thrust with four combustion chamber/nozzle assemblies

Performance

- Maximum speed: 925 kn (1,064 mph, 1,713 km/h)
- Range: 39 nmi (45 mi, 72 km)
- Service ceiling: 71,500 ft (21,800 m)
- Wing loading: 49 lb/sq ft (240 kg/m^{2})
- Thrust/weight: 1.3

== Gallery ==
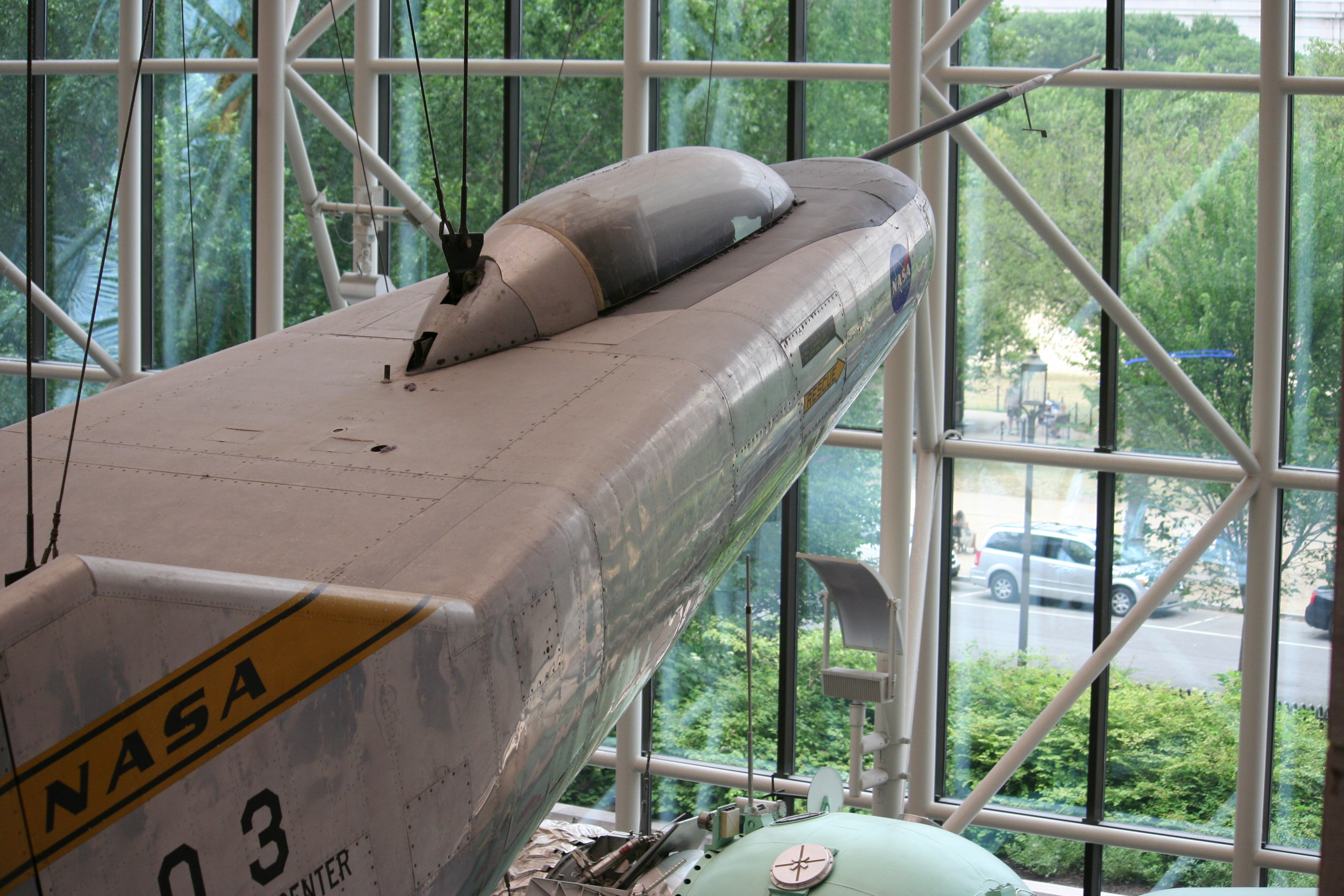

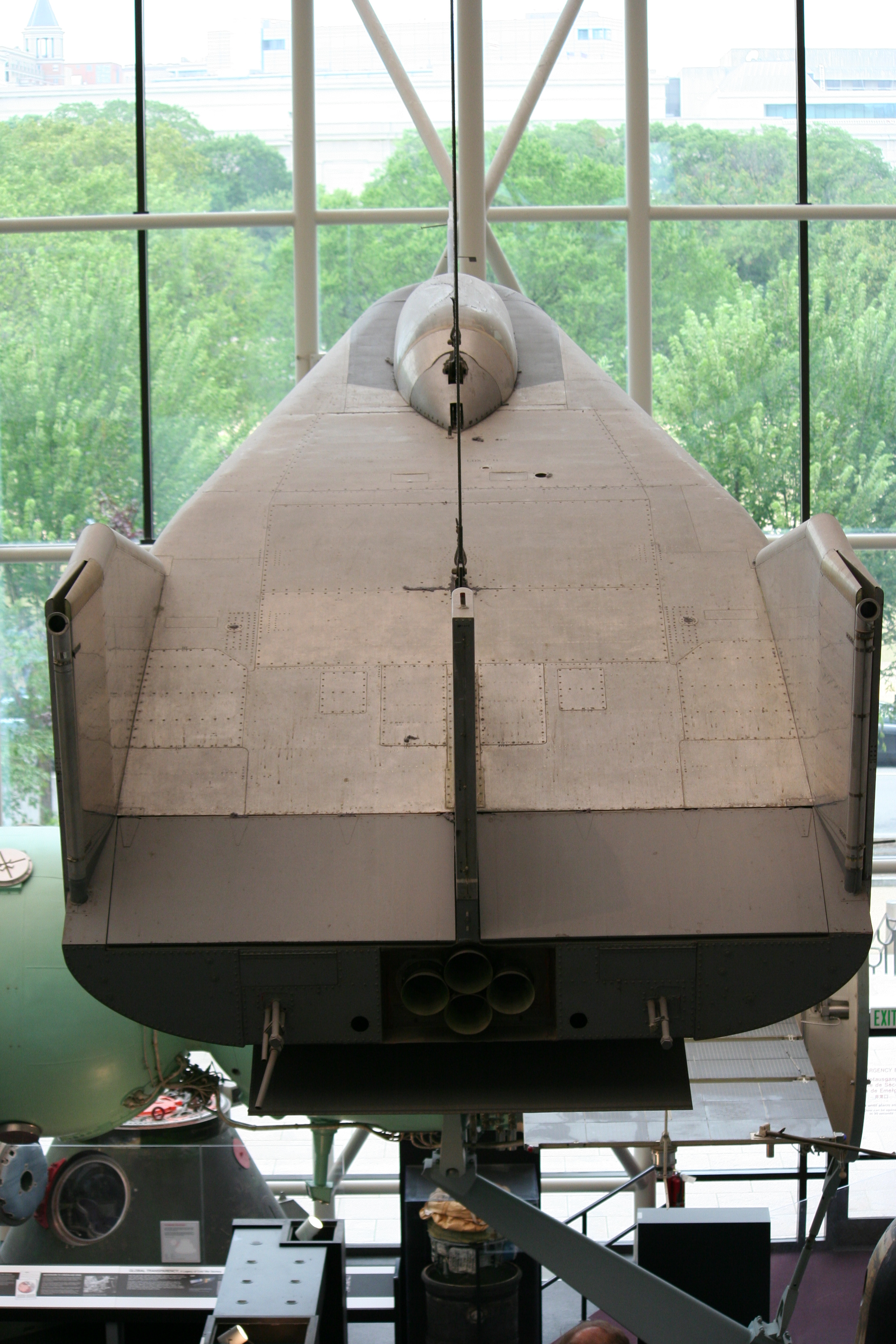

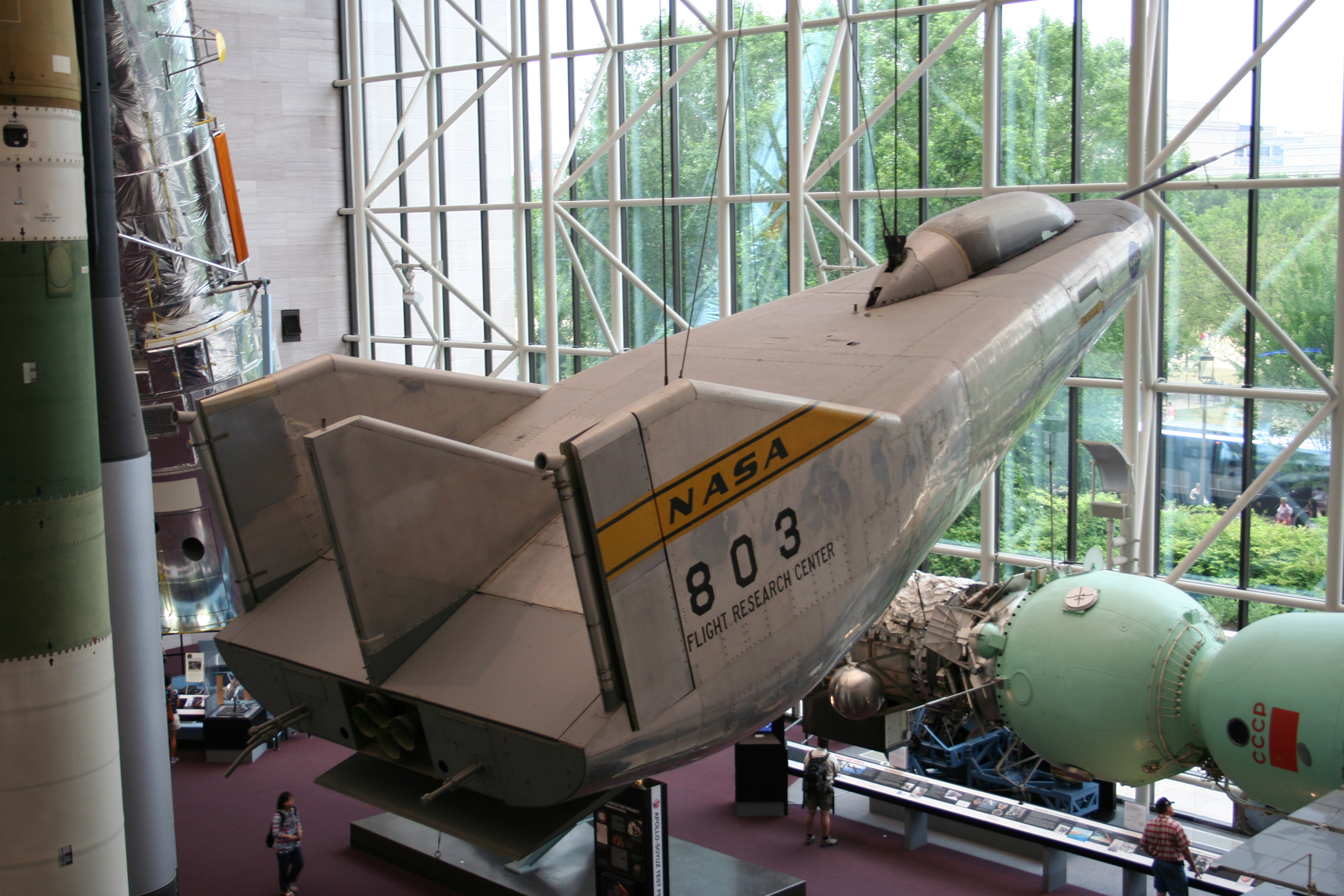

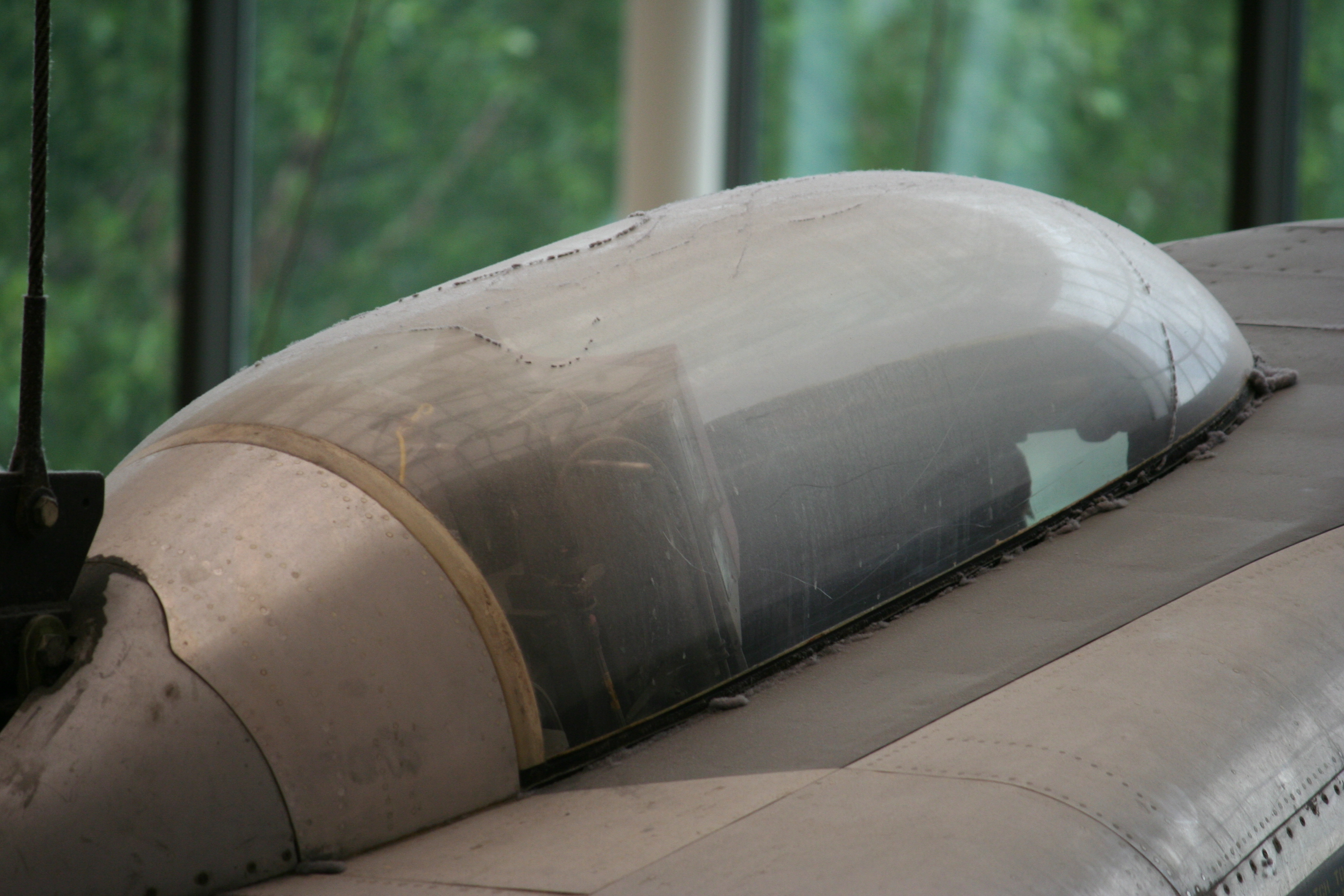

== See also ==
Comparable aircraft:

- X-24
- M2-F1
- M2-F2
- HL-10
