= Frederick M. Trapnell =

United States Navy admiral

Frederick Mackay Trapnell
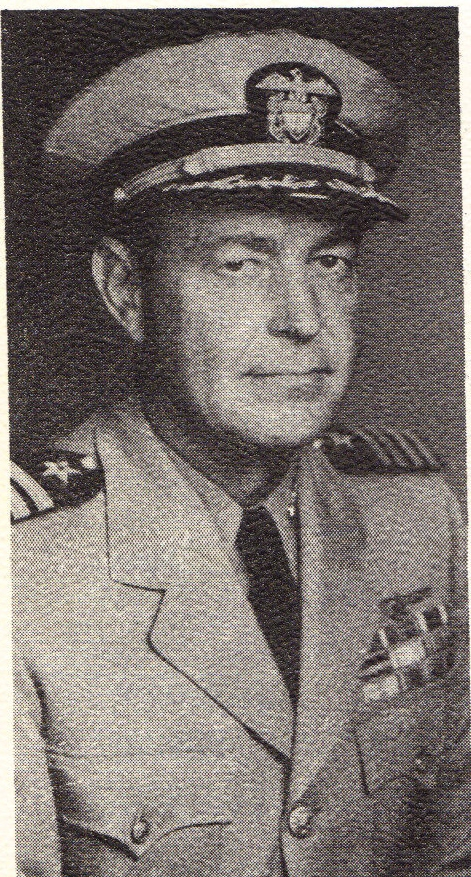
- CAPT Frederick Trapnell as CO, USS Coral Sea (CV-43)
- Born: July 9, 1902; Elizabeth, New Jersey
- Died: January 30, 1975 (aged 72); San Diego, California
- Military career
- Allegiance: United States of America
- Branch: United States Navy
- Service years: 1923 – 1963
- Rank: Vice Admiral
- Nicknames: "Trap", "Fred"
- Commands: Naval Air Test Center; USS Coral Sea; Sandia Base (deputy cmdr)
- Conflicts: World War II; Korean War
- Awards: Legion of Merit; Bronze Star Medal; Navy Commendation Medal

Frederick Mackay Trapnell (July 9, 1902 – January 30, 1975) was a United States Navy admiral and aviation pioneer. Trapnell was the first US Navy pilot to fly a jet aircraft, was considered the best, most experienced naval test aviator of his generation, co-founded the branch's first test pilot school, and played a pivotal role in both the development of future Naval aircraft and the survival of the post-World War II Navy's air arm. In 2015, Trapnell was inducted into the International Air & Space Hall of Fame at the San Diego Air & Space Museum.

Trapnell was also a cousin of Bataan Death March survivor, LTG Thomas J. H. Trapnell and his nephew, the noted hijacker, Garrett Brock Trapnell.

== Early life ==
Frederick Trapnell was born in Elizabeth, New Jersey, to Benjamin Trapnell of Charles Town, West Virginia, and Ada Probasco of Ohio. Trapnell came from a prosperous family with a long military tradition. His father and several cousins attended the United States Naval Academy in Annapolis, Maryland—although Benjamin's military career was cut short by an infamous hazing incident. Several other cousins were officers in the United States Army as was his brother, Wallace Probasco Trapnell, who served in the Signal Corps. Following his father, Trapnell attended the Naval Academy, graduated, and was commissioned an ensign in 1923. After serving for two years at sea on board the battleship USS California and the cruiser USS Marblehead, Trapnell was assigned to Naval Air Station Pensacola in 1926 for flight training, thus beginning his career as a naval aviator.

== Naval aviator ==
Trapnell reportedly had "a natural flying ability" and "a firm grasp of aerodynamics." While at Pensacola, he flew in a variety of aircraft, gaining significant experience and further honing his skills. In 1930, he was transferred to Naval Air Station Anacostia in Washington, D.C. In June of that year, along with two other pilots, he was assigned to a new unit, the Three Flying Fish, the Navy's first official aerial demonstration team. Flying specially modified Curtiss F6C-4 biplanes, they traveled around the nation performing intricate, aerobatic exhibitions.

The team was disbanded in April 1931, and Trapnell was soon assigned to the small plane unit attached to the Navy's dirigible airfleet. From 1932 to 1934, he served on the airship USS Akron at Naval Air Station Lakehurst in New Jersey and her sister, USS Macon at Naval Air Station Sunnyvale, California. At the latter installation, he was responsible for re-engineering the apparatus for hooking up aircraft while in flight as well as a rewriting the procedure. In 1938, Lt. Trapnell flew in a squadron of eighteen bombers from San Diego, California, to Honolulu, Hawaii, in what was "the greatest over-ocean formation flight" to date.

LCDR Trapnell returned to Anacostia in 1942 as the chief of the Test Flight Section. Two years later, and with promotion to commander, he relocated with the section to the new Naval Air Test Center in Maryland.

With World War II raging, Trapnell dedicated himself to redesigning flight testing and procedures. He initiated a series of lectures and classes to familiarize pilots not only with the rudiments of flying but to learn the intimate details of flight engineering, performance, stability, and control. He required that the aviator know every aspect of his aircraft under all conditions.

So respected was Trapnell's knowledge and ability that, in 1942, he was personally requested by Roy Grumman to evaluate the new Grumman F6F Hellcat, the Navy's answer to the lethal Japanese Zero. Circumventing the usual testing procedures, Grumman had Trapnell take the fighter on a crash program. "He came to the factory and flew the prototype F6F. It suited him, as I remember, except for the longitudinal stability—he wanted more of that. We built it in and rushed into production without a Navy certificate on the model. We relied on Trapnell's opinion. His test flight took less than three hours. I'm not sure we ever got an official OK on the Hellcat design." Trapnell later gained valuable knowledge of what the Hellcat and its predecessor, the Wildcat, were up against after performing extensive tests in a captured Zero recovered from a crash that same year.

Trapnell's unit continued to test a host of American and British aircraft and was responsible for many innovations. Following Trapnell's recommendations after months of testing, engineers at Vought Aviation extensively redesigned a new fighter already under development, the famous F4U Corsair. Of the F7F Tigercat, Trapnell is reputed to have exclaimed: "It's the best damn fighter I've every flown." 1943 saw Trapnell on temporary duty assignment at the Muroc Army Air Field in California for secret testing. On April 21, he became the first naval aviator to pilot a jet aircraft, the Bell XP-59A Airacomet, the first such plane built in the United States. Shortly thereafter, he was promoted to captain.

For the remainder of the war Trapnell served in the fleet, commanding two squadrons and an escort carrier. In October 1944, he became chief of staff to RADM Arthur Radford, Commander Carrier Division Six, overseeing the remaining air strikes and amphibious landings in the Pacific theater.

== Naval Test Pilot School ==
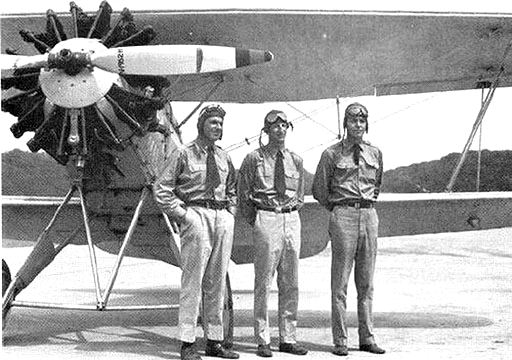
The Three Flying Fish, Naval Air Station Anacostia, 1930. Trapnell is on the right. US Naval Historical Center

In 1946, Trapnell was back at NATC as test coordinator and shepherding the monumental changes in engineering, testing, and other procedures ushered in by jet aircraft. This included vastly upgrading and regularizing the unofficial Test Pilot School that had been in existence since the Test Flight Section had arrived in 1944–45. Serving as acting commander of NATC for six months in 1947 afforded Trapnell the opportunity to make substantial changes. Working with chief project engineer CDR Sydney Sherby and with the backing of RADM Apollo Soucek, Trapnell devised a plan for an official test pilot program which was approved on January 22, 1948, by ADM John D. Price, the Deputy Chief of Naval Operations. The Test Pilot Training Division began formal operation in April of that year under the direction of Sherby.

Continuing his affiliation with the school, Trapnell assisted Sherby in selecting the candidates who would compose the first class, which begun on July 6, 1948. He also helped to outfit the school by procuring desks and other material. A collection of some 550 technical books that he had amassed over time became its first library. Additionally, Trapnell contributed to the school's highly popular textbook, Airplane Aerodynamics, writing its foreword.

In June 1949, Trapnell once again became commander of NATC. He also received the Octave Chanute Award that summer for "showing outstanding ability not only in flying every type of aircraft but also in detecting critical defects in new airplanes and suggesting ways to deal with them." His work on carrier-based aircraft was particularly noted. In October of that year, Trapnell appeared before the House Armed Services Committee during the Revolt of the Admirals incident, where he provided crucial testimony on behalf of naval aviation. A reporter, covering the event for Time, observed that the famed aviator "ha[d] probably flown more types of planes than any other U.S. pilot."

== Post aviator career ==
Trapnell was appointed as commanding officer of the aircraft carrier USS Coral Sea, effective April 29, 1950. He immediately put his extensive aviator experience to use in order to increase efficiency. Among other innovations, Trapnell revised the system and apparatus utilized for carrier take-offs, considerably streamlining the amount of time expended for the procedure.

In February 1951, he was promoted to rear admiral and became- in March- deputy commander of both Sandia Base and the Field Command Armed Forces Special Weapons Project at Albuquerque, New Mexico. He served in this capacity until suffering a debilitating heart attack in April 1952. That September, Trapnell medically retired with the rank of vice admiral.

After the Navy, Trapnell worked as a consultant for Grumman Aircraft for the next 23 years and became a sailing enthusiast. On April 1, 1976, the air field at Naval Air Station Patuxent River was officially named "Trapnell Field" in his honor. At the dedication ceremony, keynote speaker ADM Frederick H. Michaelis, Chief of Naval Material, said:

Vice Admiral Trapnell was a pioneer test pilot whose calculated daring and prophetic vision
served to advance the science of naval aviation test and evaluation. 'Get the numbers’ was the
watchword of the test pilots he trained and led. His contributions to aviation were enormous.

In 1986, Trapnell was inducted into the Naval Aviation Hall of Honor.

== Family ==
Trapnell was married to his first wife, Mary Elizabeth Belcher, in 1929; they had one son Frederick Mackay Trapnell. His second marriage, in 1936 to Alice Moffitt, produced one son, Herbert Wallace. Both marriages were to women of socially prominent West Coast families; the Trapnells made several appearances in articles covering socialite circles usually involving festivities in Coronado, an affluent city near San Diego.

Trapnell's extended family had a degree of public attention—both famous and infamous—attached to it. His father Benjamin had been discharged from the Navy while a midshipman at the Naval Academy after an incident aboard the academy's training vessel, the USS Constellation (1854), in August 1883. In the first such trial of its kind, Benjamin Trapnell and several others were convicted of hazing younger midshipmen.

Benjamin later served as a United States Attorney for West Virginia under the second Cleveland Administration. During a banquet given by former residents of Charles Town, West Virginia, at the St. Denis Hotel in New York, he caused a public stir when he lambasted the McKinley Administration's policies in regards to newly acquired territory from the recently concluded Spanish–American War.

Trapnell's distant cousin Joseph likewise had a brief and ironic public appearance, Joseph, then a captain for Eastern Airlines, foiled an attempted hijacking of his own aircraft. A Cuban refugee attempted to commandeer the plane, en route from Chicago to Miami, but was overpowered by the pilot and co-pilot.

== Notes ==
Military offices
Preceded by Robert Goldthwaite	Captain, USS Coral Sea (CV-43); 1950–1951	Succeeded by James S. Russell
