= Arthur W. Murray =

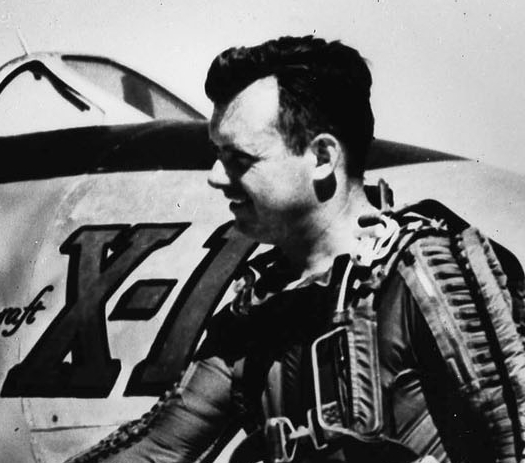
- Kit Murray by X-1A
- Born: December 26, 1918; Cresson, Pennsylvania, U.S.
- Died: July 25, 2011 (aged 92); West, Texas, U.S.
- Military career
- Allegiance: United States of America
- Branch: United States Air Force
- Service years: 1939–1961
- Rank: Lieutenant Colonel
- Nickname: Kit
- Awards: Distinguished Flying Cross; Air Medal; Aerospace Walk of Honor
- Other work: Aerospace manager

Arthur Warren "Kit" Murray (December 26, 1918 – July 25, 2011) was a United States test pilot who flew test flights on the Bell X-1 and the Bell X-5 aircraft. He was the first pilot to see the curvature of the Earth and set an unofficial altitude record of more than 90,000 feet at over twice the speed of sound.

== Early life ==
Arthur Warren Murray was born to Charles C. "Chester" and Elsie Murray in the small town of Cresson nestled in the Allegheny Mountains of Pennsylvania on December 26, 1918.

== Military career ==
With World War II already underway in Europe, he joined the United States Army in 1939, and served in the Cavalry. Murray volunteered for pilot training the day after the attack on Pearl Harbor, and by 1943 was flying the Curtiss P-40 Warhawk as a fighter pilot in Africa. His unit worked its way across the continent from Casablanca to Tunisia, escorting North American B-25 Mitchell, Martin B-26 Marauder and Douglas A-20 Havoc bombers as well as performing dive bombing and strafing missions. His unit was proud to never have lost a bomber to enemy fighters while under their escort.

=== Test piloting ===
After a year's tour in Africa, Murray returned to the United States as a Republic P-47 Thunderbolt instructor at Bradley Field near Hartford, Connecticut. He was then assigned as a maintenance flight test pilot and sent to Maintenance Engineering School at Chanute Air Force Base. After completion of that school his commander found out about the Flight Test School at Wright Field and decided to send him there. Here was where Murray got his big break as he quickly found out this school was not for functional test flights, but for experimental test programs. He kept his mouth shut and stuck with the program, and soon was offered the opportunity to be the first permanent test pilot to be assigned to Muroc Airfield (later Edwards Air Force Base) in the California desert. Until then, pilots were based at the Wright Field Test Center and assigned TDY as needed to Muroc. Chuck Yeager was making such trips out there from the Test Center while he was flying the Bell X-1 on the first supersonic test flights. In early tests Murray was able to fly some of America's earliest jet aircraft including the Bell XP-59 and the P-80. He also flew the P-51, P-82, F-84, B-25, B-43, B-45 and many other fighter and bomber aircraft.

Murray flight-tested the X-1A and X-1B, the X-4, the X-5, and also flew the XF-92A. In the X-1A, Murray set an altitude record of over 90,000 feet and was considered at the time, 1954, America's first space pilot. He saw the curvature of the Earth and the sky dark at mid-day. The X-1A was powered by four rocket motors using liquid oxygen and alcohol as fuel. Looking rather exotic even in photos today, the X-1 used nitrogen tanks to pressurize many of the systems including the fuel tanks, cockpit and the landing gear system. However, the flight controls were completely conventional with strictly mechanical linkage and no hydraulic boost.

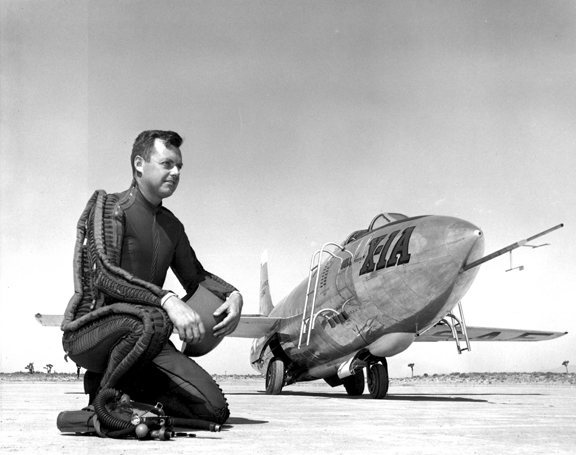
Arthur W. "Kit" Murray with the X-1A. See https://www.nasa.gov/centers/dryden/multimedia/imagegallery/X-1A/Maj_Arthur_Murray.html

The X-1A was launched from the belly of a B-29 and later a B-50, and the flight profile had him using a 45 degree pitch attitude with airspeeds reaching about Mach 2. On his first couple of high altitude flights, Murray said his plane would snap into a spin when the motors burned out while approaching his peak altitude. He finally figured that the rocket motors were installed very slightly offset which, to keep it going straight, was causing him to have to cross control the plane increasingly as it accelerated. When the engines shut off, the cross-control condition, which was keeping the airplane from yawing, now became the perfect spin entry input.

After two flights involving supersonic spin recovery, Murray was quick to neutralize the controls immediately upon motor shutdown in later flights. He had taped a string in front of the windshield to determine his rudder trim input. Murray was the first pilot to fly the X1-B aircraft in powered flight, and he said it was a much straighter flying rocket ship than the X-1A. The X-4 he flew was basically a flying wing type aircraft (no horizontal tail) and the X-5 was a variable sweep test platform.

Murray was a test pilot at Muroc/Edwards from 1949 to 1955, an unusually long time for that assignment.

=== Engineering ===
Murray's next Air Force assignment was in Paris, France. He was in charge of technology integration for the U.S. Regional Organization there and was privileged to fly some of Europe's top airplanes at the time, including the Italian Fiat G-91, the French Mystere, and the British Javelin.

Upon returning from Paris, he went to Wright-Patterson Air Force Base as head of new developments at the Systems Project Office. During his time there, 1958–1960, he was Air Force manager for the X-15 program, which attained record altitudes of 354,000 feet and a speed record of 4,534 m.p.h. (Mach 6.7). The X-15 program contributed enormously to the space program and high speed aircraft research, and was acclaimed as the most successful test program of its type. Among Murray's test pilots there was Neil Armstrong. Murray held the rank of major at the time, but this was considered a colonel's job. He was approached by Boeing in 1960. He retired with over 20 years of military service and became Boeing's "company astronaut" managing crew integration for the space program. In that capacity he massaged the gap between engineers and scientists who wanted astronauts to ride in a sealed capsule, and pilots who wanted to be able to see what was going on during flights. Murray worked for Boeing on many space program projects from 1960 to 1969, from the X-20 (a single place space shuttle) to the Apollo program. He was technical integration manager for Boeing at Cape Canaveral. In 1969 Murray moved to the Ft. Worth area to become Air Force Requirements Engineer for Bell Helicopter in the tilt rotor program. He worked for them until 1971, then gradually slowed down in retirement, but still doing many things interesting to him.

== Personal life ==
Arthur Murray married Elizabeth Ann (Betty Anne) Strelic in 1943. They had six children, Michael, John, Christopher, Catherine, Patrick, and Peter. The family fostered a seventh child, Elizabeth Anne(Betsy) from the time of her birth in 1963 until the couple separated in 1966. He managed a hunting club, flew some charter work for Mustang Aviation in Dallas, served on the board of the Fort Worth Opera Association, then did some courtroom reporting for the Bosque County newspaper. He also was project manager for the restoration of the Bosque County Courthouse, taking it back to its 1886 splendor. Murray remarried on April 4, 1969, to Dallas interior designer Ann Tackitt Humphreys. They combined their efforts and expertise in renovating the Bosque County Court House and served as charter members of TETRA, a Texas equine trail riding organization.

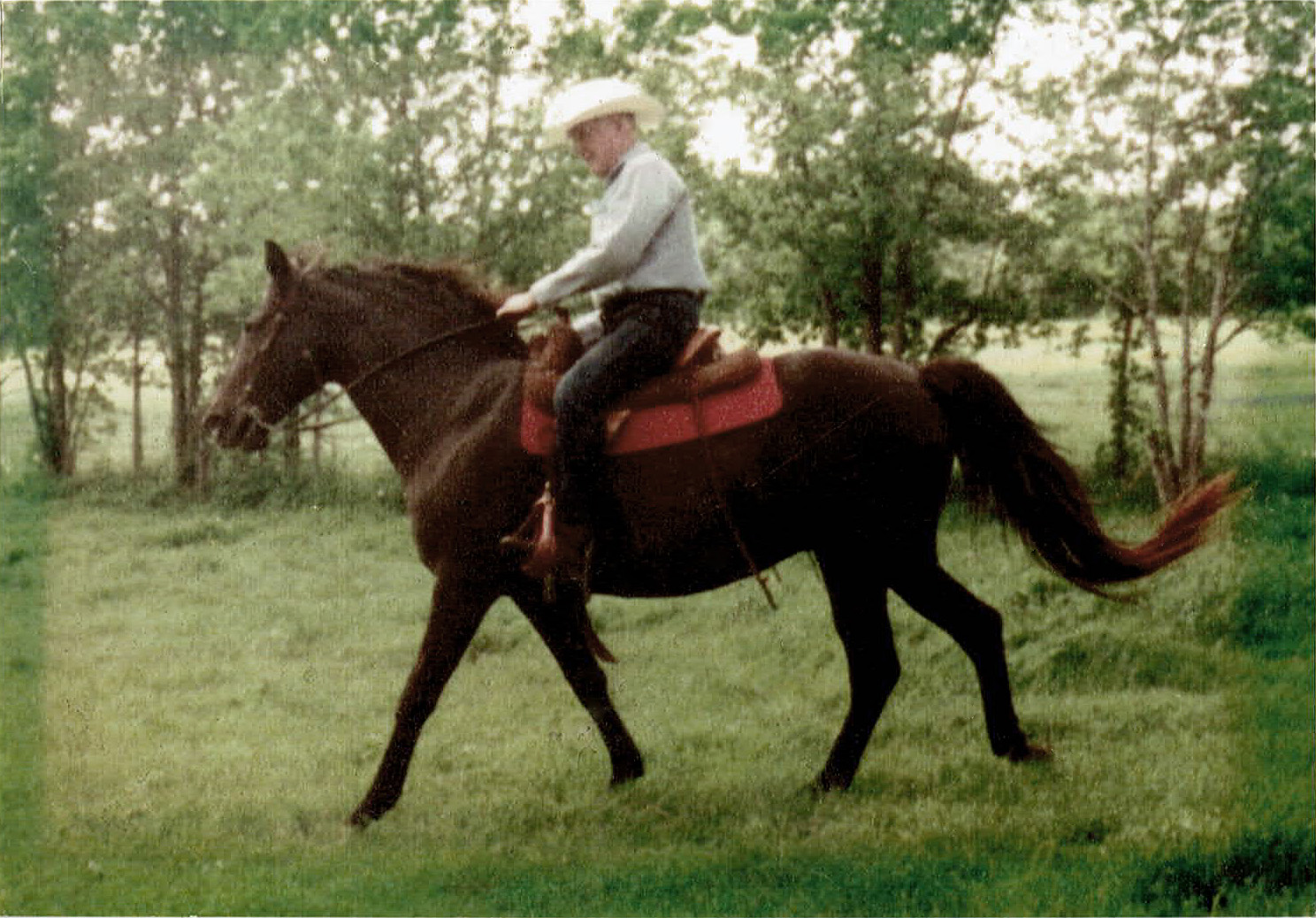
Arthur W. "Kit" Murray on his horse Amber, April 2000. Courtesy of Patrick Murray.

Kit Murray died on July 25, 2011, at a nursing home in the town of West, Texas at the age of 92.

== Honors ==
Murray was awarded the following decorations for his military service: Distinguished Flying Cross and the Air Medal with eight oak leaf clusters. He is a Fellow of the Society of Experimental Test Pilots and recipient of the French Medal of the City of Paris. In 1996, Murray was inducted into the Aerospace Walk of Honor in Lancaster, California, that honors test pilots who have contributed to aviation and space research and development.

== Television appearance ==
On November 6, 1955, Major Murray appeared as the second guest on the TV show What's My Line (go to 7:30 in video).

Preceded by Marion Eugene Carl	Human altitude record 1954-1956	Succeeded by Iven Carl Kincheloe Jr.
