= Jerauld R. Gentry =

United States Air Force pilot (1935–2003)

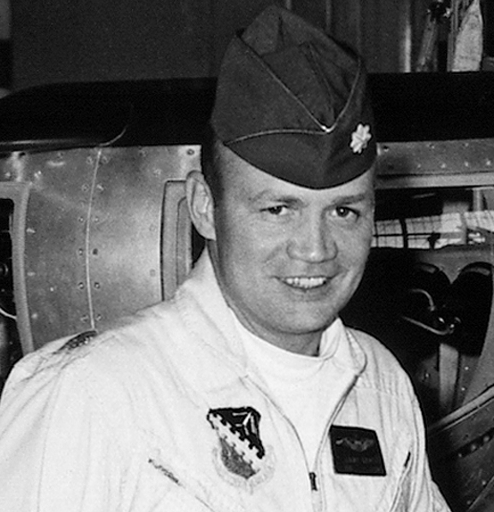
- Jerry Gentry in front of the Northrop M2-F3 lifting body
- Born: May 16, 1935; Enid, Oklahoma, U.S.
- Died: March 3, 2003 (aged 67); Alexandria, Virginia, U.S.
- Burial place: Arlington National Cemetery
- Military career
- Allegiance: United States of America
- Branch: United States Air Force
- Service years: 1957–1985 (28 years)
- Rank: Colonel
- Nickname: Jerry
- Commands: 388th TFW
- Conflicts: Vietnam War; Cold War
- Awards: Silver Star; Legion of Merit; Distinguished Flying Cross; Meritorious Service Medal; Air Medal; Vietnam Service Medal; Air Force Longevity Service Award; Vietnam Campaign Medal; Harmon Trophy; Iven C. Kincheloe Award; Octave Chanute Award; Aerospace Walk of Honor
- Other work: Aerospace Executive

Jerauld Richard "Jerry" Gentry (May 16, 1935 – March 3, 2003) was a United States Air Force (USAF) test pilot and Vietnam combat veteran. As chief USAF pilot of the Lifting Body Research Program, he helped validate the concept of flying a wingless vehicle back to Earth from space and landing it like an aircraft—an approach used by the Space Shuttle and to a greater degree by vehicles such as the Lockheed Martin X-33 and NASA X-38. Gentry completed thirty lifting body flights including the first flight of the Martin-Marietta X-24A and the second flight of the Northrop HL-10.

== Biography ==
=== Early years ===
Gentry was born in Enid, Oklahoma to Louise (née Hoyt) Gentry and Richard "Dick" Gentry. He attended Kemper Military School in Boonville, Missouri. He graduated from the United States Naval Academy at Annapolis, Maryland in 1957 and accepted his commission with the U.S. Air Force.

=== Military career ===
Gentry received pilot training in 1958 and flew the F-100 Super Sabre. He attended the Aerospace Research Pilot School (now the USAF Test Pilot School) at Edwards Air Force Base in California and graduated with class 63A. He spent the next seven years at the Air Force Flight Test Center flying tests on the F-104 Starfighter, Northrop F-5, General Dynamics F-111, and the F-4 Phantom II.

Gentry was the project pilot on a series of F-4E spin susceptibility and prevention tests with Burt Rutan as a project engineer. The spin test program culminated in a report and a training film, Unload for Control, that was presented to F-4 aircrews.

==== Lifting body test pilot ====
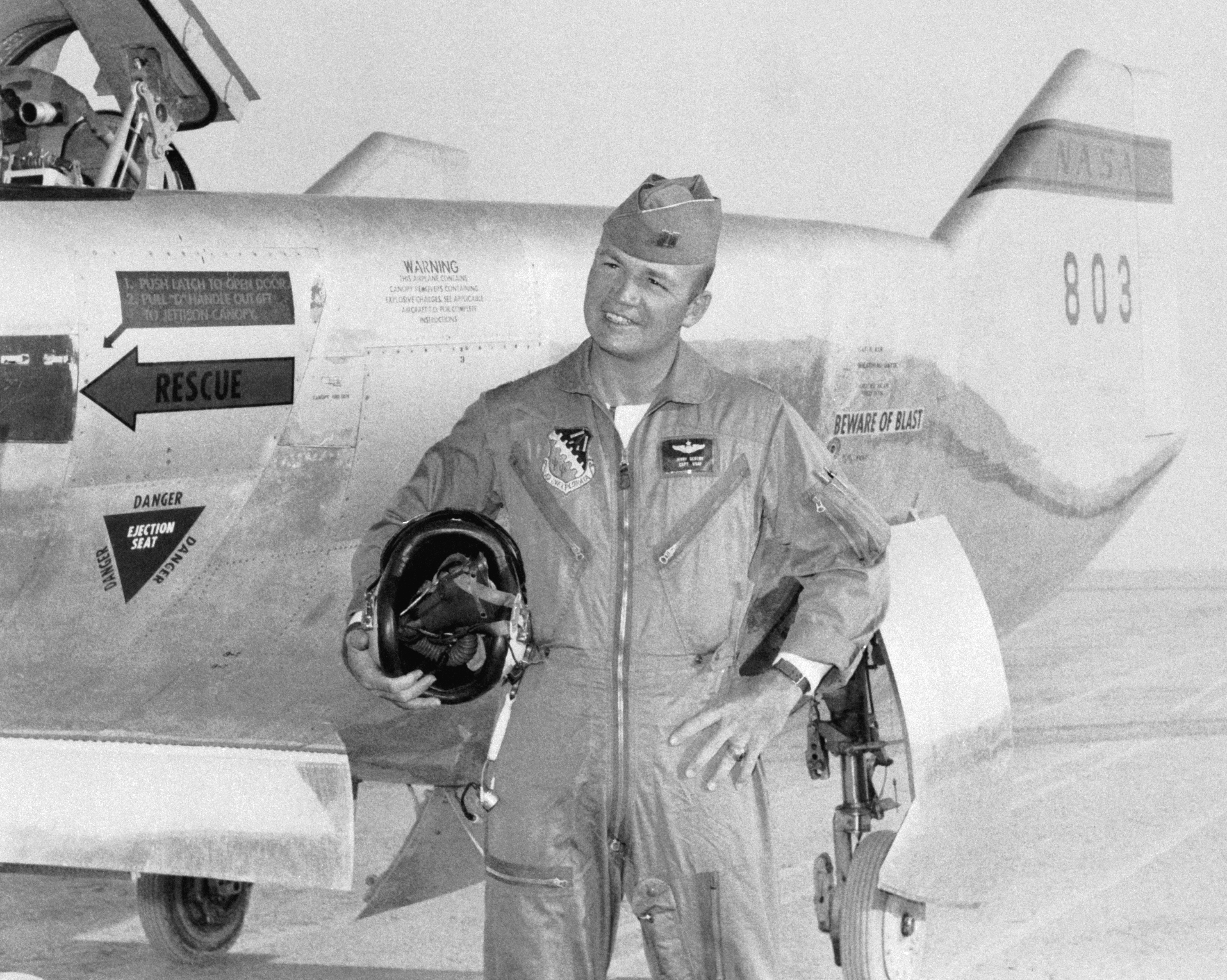
Capt Gentry by M2-F2 in 1966

Gentry's most notable contributions to flight tests occurred when he was assigned to the lifting body research program in 1965. The lifting body program, operated jointly by the National Aeronautics and Space Administration (NASA) and the Air Force, performed the initial manned tests to evaluate the feasibility of landing a wingless spacecraft on a pre-determined runway. Gentry was the eighth pilot assigned to the lifting body program and made his first air-towed flight in the NASA M2-F1 on July 16, 1965. He transitioned to the heavyweight Northrop M2-F2 lifting body which he first flew on October 12, 1966, in an unpowered mission air-dropped from a B-52 Stratofortress. By May 1967, he had made five unpowered flights in the M2-F2 to define the vehicle's aerodynamic characteristics in preparation for upcoming rocket-powered supersonic flights. M2-F2 testing ended prematurely when the vehicle crashed on May 10, 1967, severely injuring fellow lifting body test pilot, Bruce Peterson.

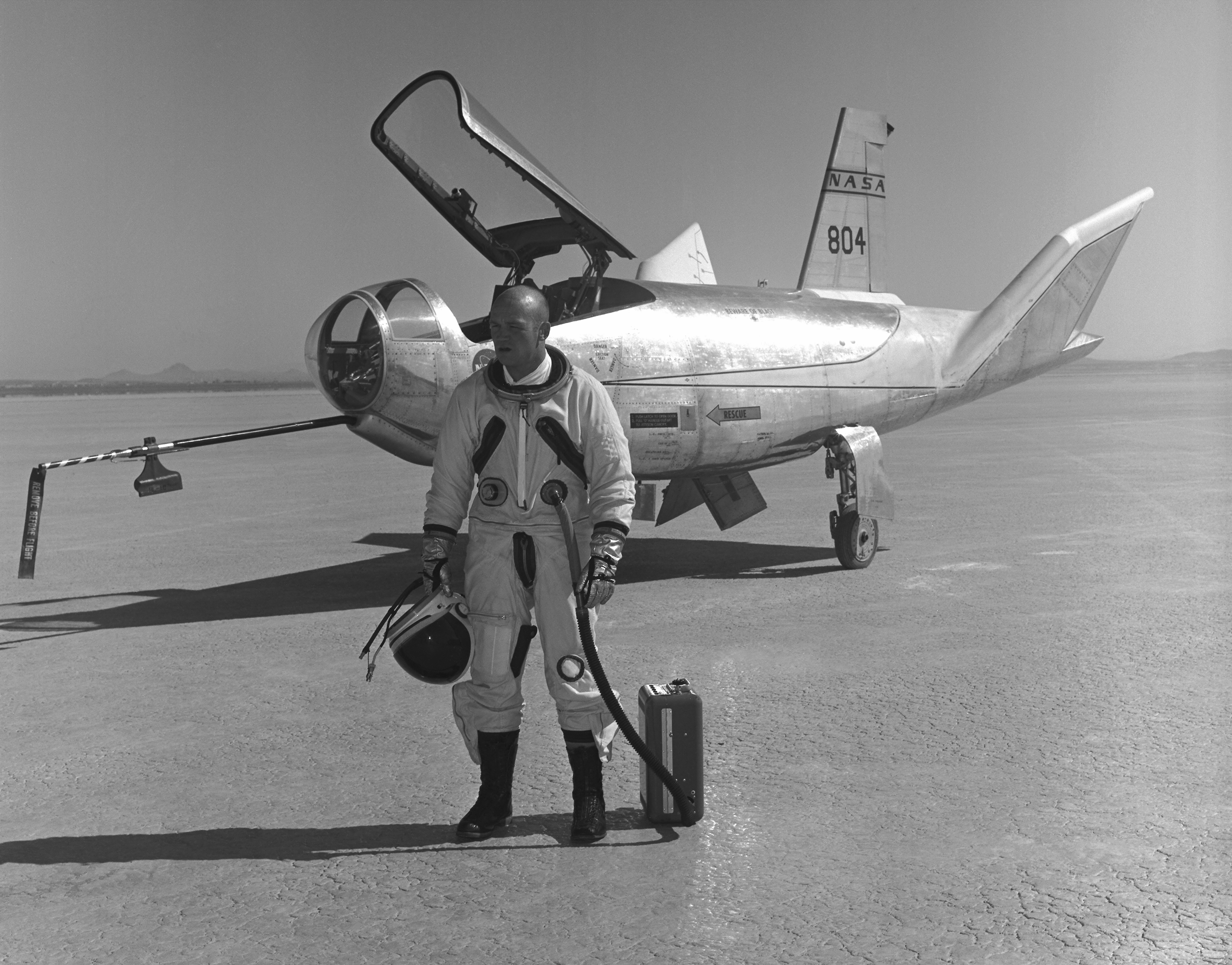
Major Gentry by HL-10 in 1968

Gentry transitioned to another heavyweight lifting body, the Northrop HL-10, and made the second flight of this vehicle on March 15, 1968. The HL-10 had just returned to flying status after nearly sixteen months of modifications to correct handling deficiencies. Gentry confirmed that the modifications were successful and reestablished confidence in the HL-10. On October 23, 1968, Gentry attempted the first powered flight in the HL-10. However, the rocket engine failed shortly after launch resulting in an emergency landing on Rosamond Dry Lake.

On April 17, 1969, Gentry flew the first, unpowered, glide-flight of the Martin-Marietta X-24A—a short teardrop shaped lifting body. After several additional unpowered flights, preparations began for the powered flight using an LR-11 rocket engine. Gentry flew the first powered flight of the X-24A on March 19, 1970, reaching a speed of Mach 0.87. In June 1970, the Northrop M2-F3 became available for testing. The M2-F3, the last of the heavyweight lifting bodies used in the program, was built from the wreckage of the M2-F2 and modified with an additional third vertical fin to improve handling characteristics. Gentry made his 30th and final lifting body flight in the M2-F3 on February 9, 1971. He was the only lifting body pilot to fly five different vehicles in the program.

While working on the lifting body program, Gentry earned a master's degree in aerospace systems management from the University of Southern California.

==== Vietnam and Cold War ====
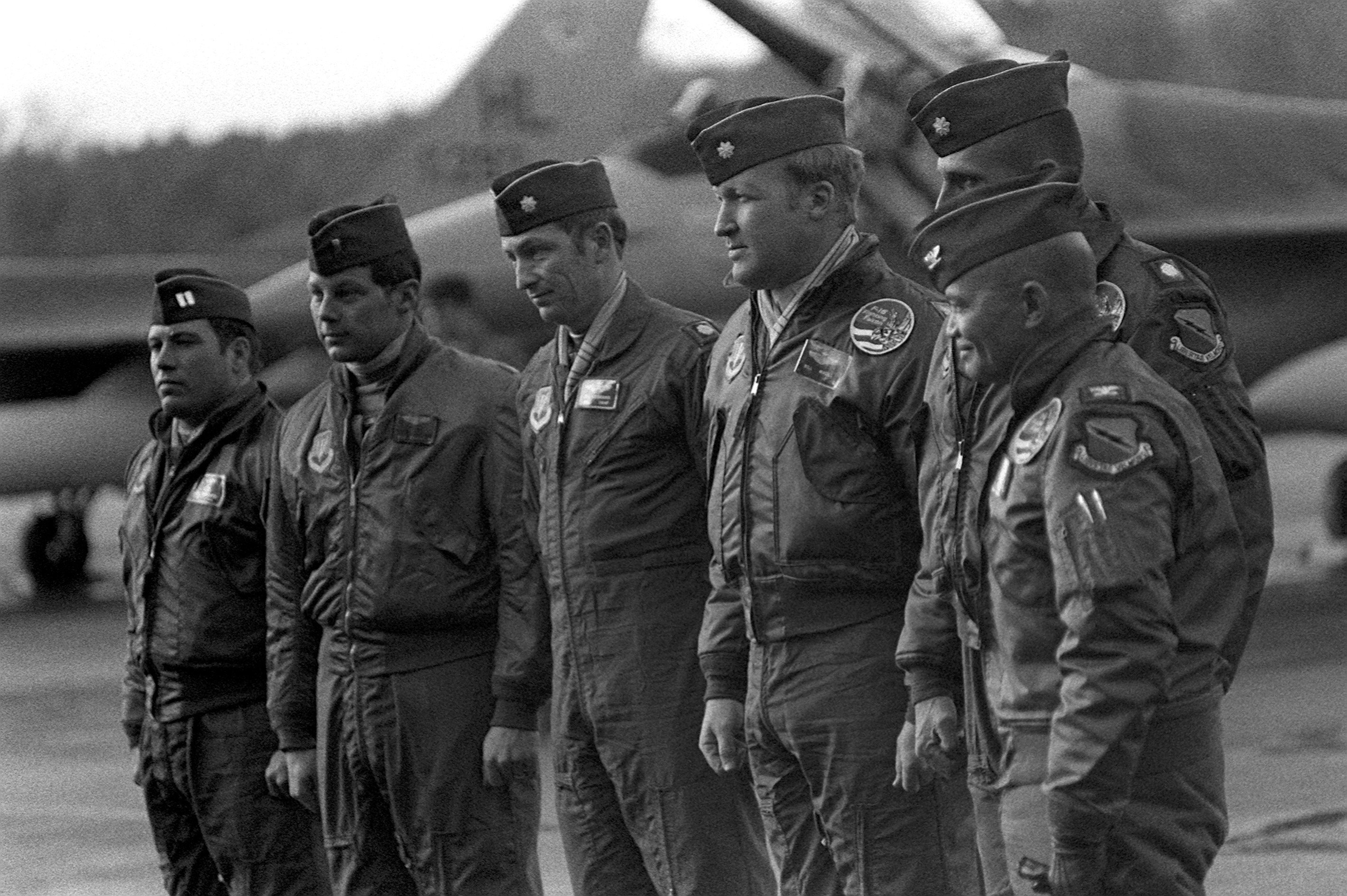
Colonel Gentry, commander 388th Tactical Fighter Wing (far right)

In January 1971, Gentry was assigned to the 8th Tactical Fighter Wing stationed at Ubon Royal Thai Air Force Base in Thailand where he flew more than 200 combat missions in the F-4 Phantom during the Vietnam War. As a Fast Forward Air Controller (FAC), Gentry earned the Silver Star—the United States' third highest military decoration for valor.

After returning to the United States, Gentry held a leadership role in the Air Force's Lightweight Fighter program that produced the F-16 Fighting Falcon. He also served as an aerial combat commander at the Red Flag tactical training exercises at Nellis Air Force Base in Nevada. On August 11, 1980, Gentry was named commander of the 388th Tactical Fighter Wing (TFW) at Hill Air Force Base in Utah. Under his command the 388th TFW was the first to transition into the F-16. In 1983, Gentry was assigned to the office of research, development and acquisitions at the headquarters for the United States Air Force. He retired from active duty in 1985.

=== Later years ===
After retiring from the Air Force, Gentry founded the aerospace consulting firm of Gentry & Associates located in Alexandria, Virginia. He was a member of many organizations related to aviation including the Air Force Association, the Red River Valley Fighter Pilots Association, the Order of Daedalians, the Society of Experimental Test Pilots, and the International Order of Characters.

Gentry died on March 3, 2003, in Alexandria, Virginia after several months of illness. A funeral was held on April 9, 2003, at the Old Post Chapel at Fort Myer followed by burial at Arlington National Cemetery. He was survived by his wife, Anne, two sons, and several grandchildren.

== Honors ==
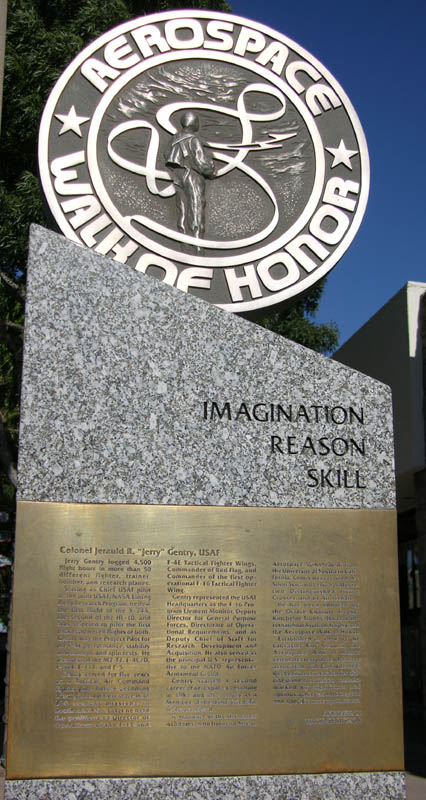
Monument to Jerry Gentry

Gentry was awarded the following decorations for his military service: Silver Star, Legion of Merit, Distinguished Flying Cross with one oak leaf cluster, Meritorious Service Medal with two oak leaf clusters, Air Medal with two silver and three bronze oak leaf clusters, Vietnam Service Medal with four bronze service stars, Air Force Longevity Service Ribbon with one silver and one bronze oak leaf cluster, and the Republic of Vietnam Campaign Medal.

For his work on the HL-10, Gentry was awarded the 1968 Harmon Aviator's Trophy for outstanding contribution to the science of flying. In 1969, the Society of Experimental Test Pilots presented Gentry with the Iven C. Kincheloe Award for his work on the NASA/Flight Research Center (FRC) Lifting Body Program. In 1970, the American Institute of Aeronautics and Astronautics presented Gentry with the Octave Chanute Award presented for an outstanding contribution made by a pilot or test personnel to the advancement of the art, science, and technology of aeronautics.

In 1987, Science Museum Oklahoma honored Gentry with membership in the Oklahoma Air and Space Hall of Fame. In 1993, he was inducted into the Aerospace Walk of Honor in Lancaster, California that honors test pilots who have contributed to aviation and space research and development.

Enid, Oklahoma, Gentry's home town, named a street at the Enid Woodring Regional Airport after him.
