= Martin Marietta X-24 =

American experimental aircraft

X-24
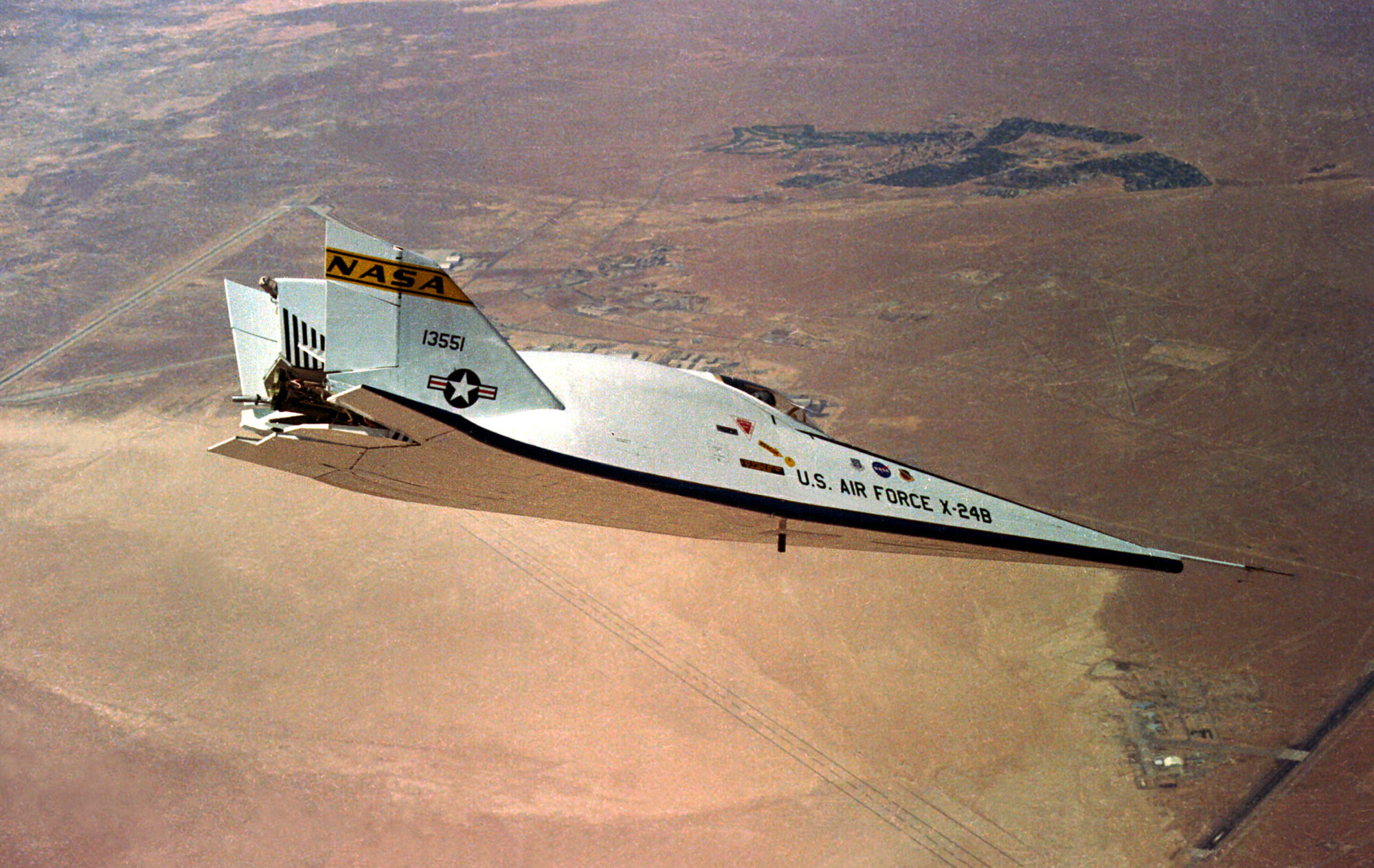
- The X-24B in flight

General information
- Type: Lifting body
- National origin: United States
- Manufacturer: Martin Marietta
- Primary users: United States Air Force NASA
- Number built: 1 (X-24A, rebuilt as X-24B)

History
- First flight: 17 April 1969 (X-24A); 1 August 1973 (X-24B)
- Retired: 26 November 1975
- Developed from: Martin X-23 PRIME

The Martin Marietta X-24 is an American experimental aircraft developed from a joint United States Air Force–NASA program named PILOT (1963–1975). It was designed and built to test lifting body concepts, experimenting with the concept of unpowered reentry and landing, later used by the Space Shuttle. Originally built as the X-24A, the aircraft was later rebuilt as the X-24B.

The X-24 was drop launched from a modified B-52 Stratofortress at high altitudes before igniting its rocket engine; after expending its rocket fuel, the pilot would glide the X-24 to an unpowered landing.

== Design and development ==
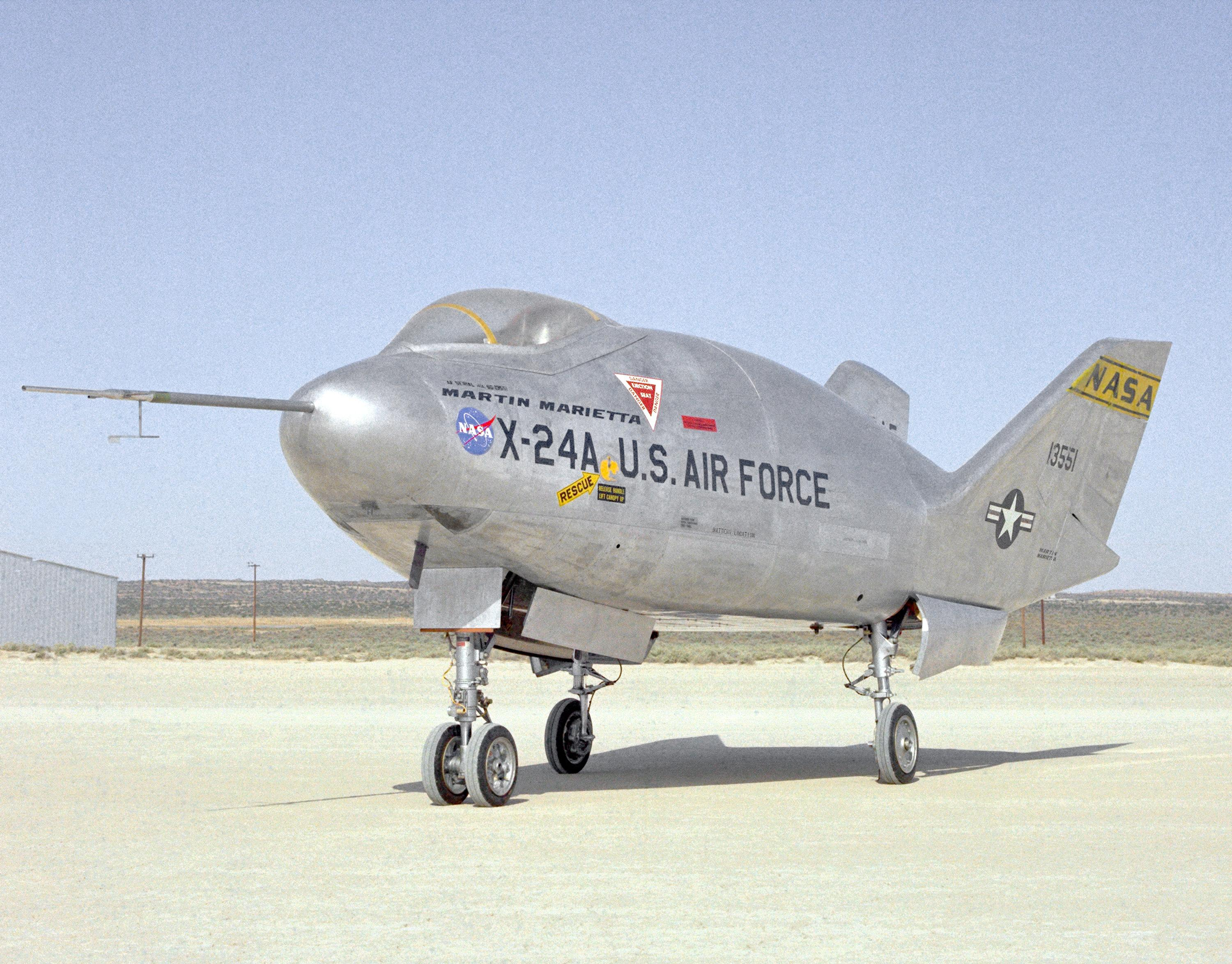
Martin X-24A

The X-24 was one of a group of lifting bodies flown by the NASA Flight Research Center (now Armstrong Flight Research Center) in a joint program with the U.S. Air Force at Edwards Air Force Base in California from 1963 to 1975. The lifting bodies were used to demonstrate the ability of pilots to maneuver and safely land wingless vehicles designed to fly back to Earth from space and be landed like an airplane at a predetermined site.

Lifting bodies’ aerodynamic lift, essential to flight in the atmosphere, was obtained from their shape. The addition of fins and control surfaces allowed the pilots to stabilize and control the vehicles and regulate their flight paths.

The X-24 (Model SV-5P) was built by Martin Marietta and flown from Edwards. The X-24A was the fourth lifting body design to fly; it followed the NASA M2-F1 in 1964, the Northrop HL-10 in (1966), the Northrop M2-F2 in 1966 and preceded the Northrop M2-F3 (1970).

The X-24A was a fat, short teardrop shape with three fins for control—the center fin vertical and the left and right fins canted slightly outward. It made its first, unpowered, glide flight on April 17, 1969 with Air Force Maj. Jerauld R. Gentry at the controls. Gentry also piloted its first powered flight on March 19, 1970. The craft was taken to around 45,000 feet (13.7 km) by a modified B-52, drop-launched, then either glided down or used its rocket engine to ascend to higher altitudes before gliding down. The X-24A was flown 28 times at speeds up to 1,036 mph (1,667 km/h) and altitudes up to 71,400 feet (21.8 km).

=== X-24B ===
The X-24B's design evolved from a family of potential reentry shapes, each with higher lift-to-drag ratios, proposed by the Air Force Flight Dynamics Laboratory. To reduce the costs of constructing a research vehicle, the Air Force returned the X-24A to the Martin Marietta Corporation—as Martin Aircraft Company became after a merger—for modifications that converted its bulbous shape into one resembling a "flying flatiron", i.e., rounded top, flat bottom, and a double delta planform that ended in a pointed nose.

John A. Manke was the first to fly the X-24B, a glide flight on 1 August 1973. He was also the pilot on the first powered mission 15 November 1973.

=== X-24C ===
A variety of "X-24C" proposals were floated between 1972 and 1978. Perhaps the most notable was a Lockheed Skunk Works design, the L-301, which was to use scramjets to reach a top speed of Mach 8.

=== SV-5J ===
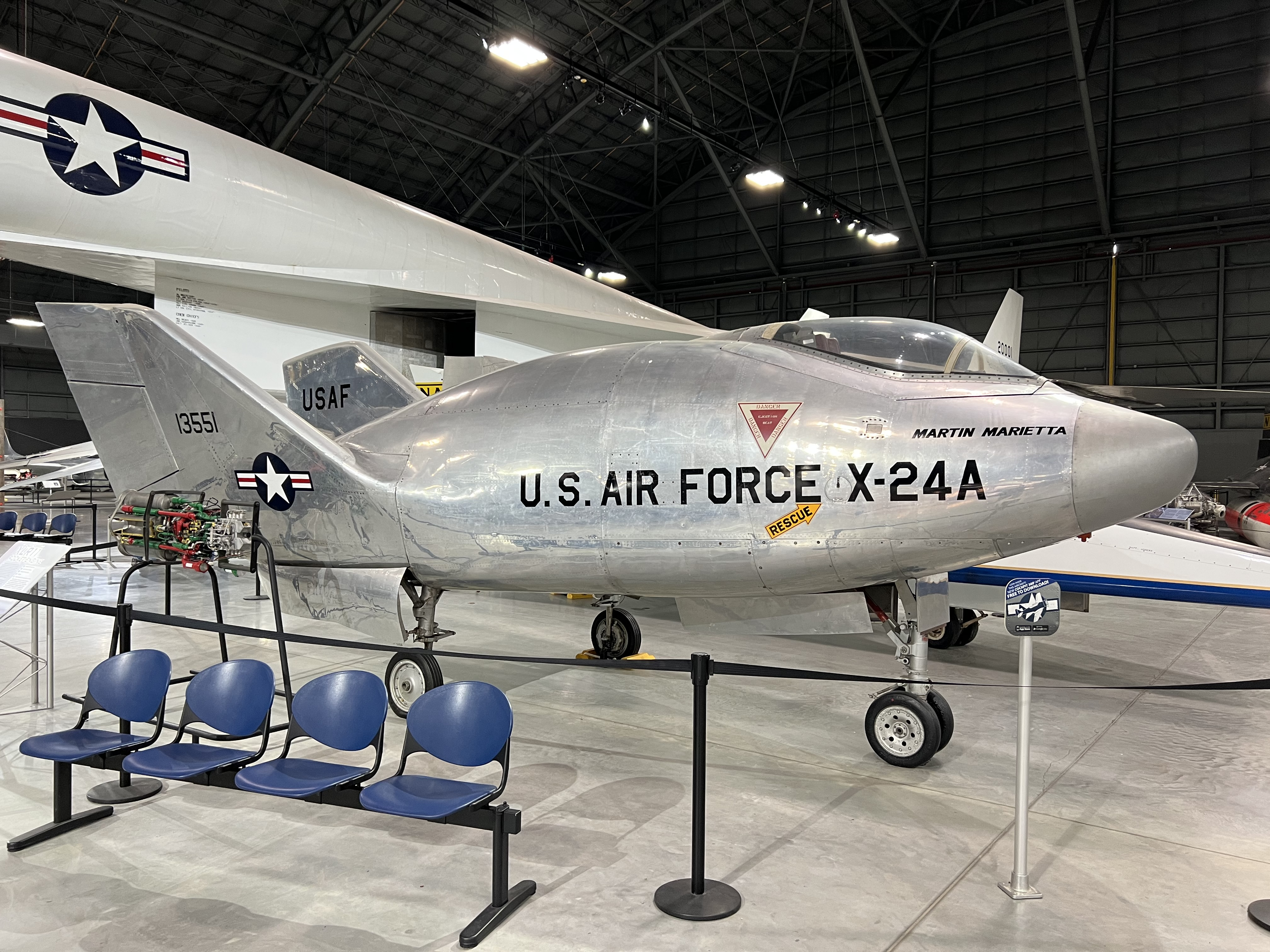
SV-5J displayed as the X-24A at the National Museum of the United States Air Force

After learning about a remark by Chuck Yeager that he would like to have some jet-powered lifting bodies for training purposes, Martin designed and built, on its own initiative, two examples of the SV-5J.

The SV-5J was a jet-powered version of the rocket-powered X-24A. The SV-5J had identical dimensions to the X-24A, but was powered by a single Pratt & Whitney J60-PW-1 jet engine of 1360 kgf, in place of the X-24A's Reaction Motors XLR-11-RM-13 rocket engine. Martin also manufactured a full-scale, unflyable, mock-up of the SV-5J. (Confusion over number built may be due to the mock-up being included in the production list.)

Martin were unable to convince Milt Thompson to fly the SV-5J, even after offering a $20,000 bonus. Both examples remained unflown.

As the original X-24A was converted to X-24B, one of the SV-5Js eventually was converted to represent the X-24A, for display at the National Museum of the United States Air Force, Wright-Patterson AFB, Ohio, beside the original X-24B.

== Operational history ==
The X-24A was flown 28 times in the program that, like the HL-10, validated the concept that a Space Shuttle vehicle could be landed unpowered. The fastest speed achieved by the X-24A was 1,036 miles per hour (1,667 km/h) miles per hour, or Mach 1.6. Its maximum altitude was 71,400 feet (21.8 km). It was powered by an XLR-11 rocket engine with a maximum theoretical vacuum thrust of 8,480 pounds-force (37.7 kN).

The X-24A was modified into the more stable X-24B with an entirely different shape in 1972. The bulbous shape of the X-24A was converted into a "flying flatiron" shape with a rounded top, flat bottom, and double delta planform that ended in a pointed nose. It was the basis for the Martin SV-5J. The X-24A shape was later borrowed for the X-38 Crew Return Vehicle (CRV) technology demonstrator for the International Space Station.

X-24A pilots

- Jerauld R. Gentry – 13 flights
- John A. Manke – 12 flights
- Cecil W. Powell – 3 flights

=== X-24B ===
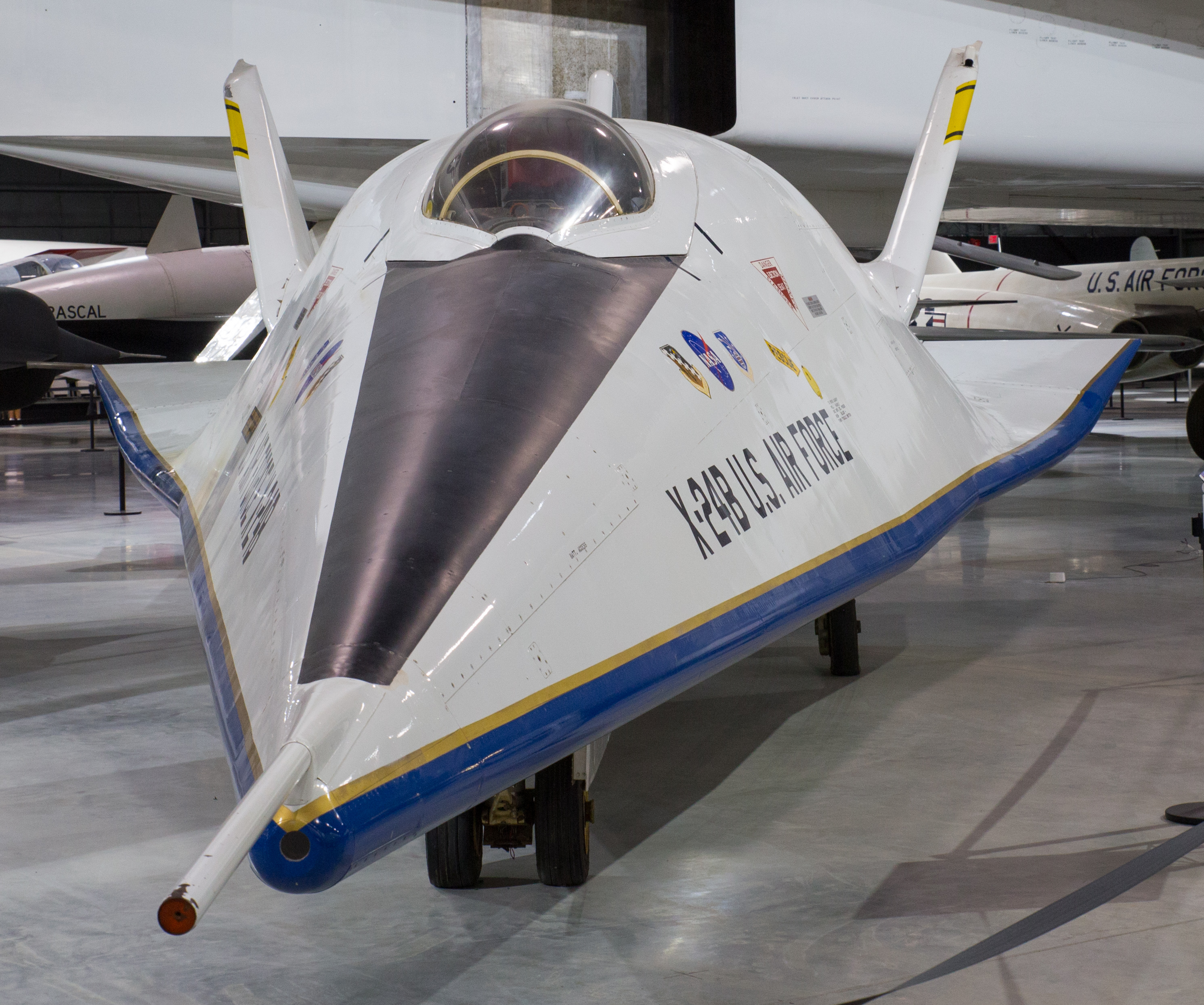
X-24B at the National Museum of the United States Air Force

The X-24B demonstrated that accurate unpowered reentry vehicle landings were operationally feasible. Top speed achieved by the X-24B was 1,164 mph (1873 km/h) and the highest altitude it reached was 74,130 feet (22.59 km). The pilot on the last powered flight of the X-24B was Bill Dana, who also flew the last X-15 flight about seven years earlier.

Among the final flights with the X-24B were two precise landings on the main concrete runway at Edwards. These missions were flown by Manke and Air Force Maj. Mike Love, and represented the final milestone in a program that helped write the flight plan for the Space Shuttle program.

The X-24B was the last aircraft to fly in Dryden's Lifting Body program. The X-24B was flown 36 times.

The X-24B is on public display at the National Museum of the United States Air Force, Wright-Patterson Air Force Base, Ohio.

X-24B pilots

- John A. Manke – 16 flights
- Michael V. Love – 12 flights
- William H. "Bill" Dana – 2 flights
- Einar Enevoldson – 2 flights
- Thomas C. McMurtry – 2 flights
- Dick Scobee – 2 flights

=== Serial number ===
- 66-13551
  - X-24A, 28 free flights; 10 unpowered, 18 powered
  - X-24B, 36 free flights; 12 unpowered, 24 powered

== Specifications (X-24B) ==
Diagram of X-24A

Diagram of X-24B

Data from Jane's All the World's Aircraft 65th ed. (1974–75)

General characteristics

- Crew: 1
- Length: 37 ft 6 in (11.43 m)
- Wingspan: 19 ft 2 in (5.84 m)
- Height: 10 ft 4 in (3.15 m)
- Wing area: 330 sq ft (31 m^{2})
- Empty weight: 7,800 lb (3,538 kg) zero propellant weight
- Max takeoff weight: 13,800 lb (6,260 kg)
- Fuel capacity: 4,500 lb (2,041 kg) total propellant weight (ethyl-alcohol/water fuel and LOX oxidiser)
- Powerplant: 1 × Reaction Motors XLR11-RM-13 (Thiokol) 4-chamber liquid-fuelled rocket engine, 8,000 lbf (36 kN) thrust
- Powerplant: 2 × Bell LLRV landing rockets solid-fuelled rocket engine, 400–500 lbf (1.8–2.2 kN) thrust each (optional)

Performance

- Maximum speed: 868 kn (999 mph, 1,608 km/h) at 60,000 ft (18,000 m)
- Maximum speed: Mach 1.52
- Range: 39 nmi (45 mi, 72 km)
- Service ceiling: 74,130 ft (22,590 m)
- Wing loading: 42 lb/sq ft (210 kg/m^{2})
- Thrust/weight: 0.71

== See also ==
- Space Shuttle

Related development

- Martin X-23 PRIME
- Lockheed L-301 (X-24C)

Aircraft of comparable role, configuration, and era

- NASA M2-F1
- Northrop M2-F2
- Northrop M2-F3
- Northrop HL-10

Related lists

- List of experimental aircraft
