= William H. Dana =

NASA research pilot and astronaut (1930–2014)

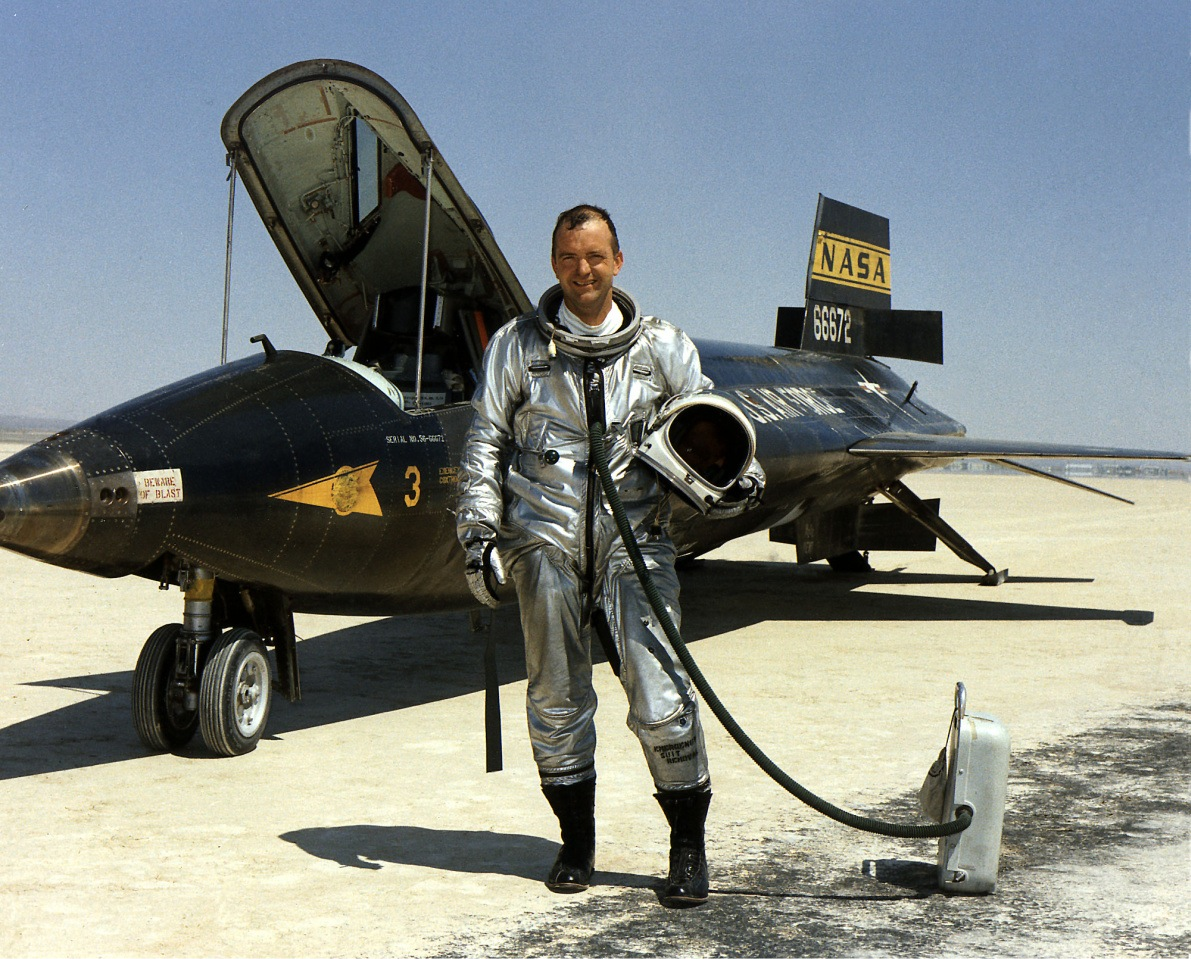
- Born: William Harvey Dana; November 3, 1930; Pasadena, California, U.S.
- Died: May 6, 2014 (aged 83); Phoenix, Arizona, U.S.
- Other name: Bill Dana
- Education: USMA, B.S. 1952; USC, M.S. 1958
- Occupation: Test pilot
- Space career

USAF / NASA astronaut
- Selection: 1960 Dyna-Soar Group 1
- Missions: X-15 Flight 174, X-15 Flight 197

William Harvey Dana (November 3, 1930 – May 6, 2014) was an American aeronautical engineer, U.S. Air Force pilot, NASA test pilot, and astronaut. He was one of twelve pilots who flew the North American X-15, an experimental spaceplane jointly operated by the Air Force and NASA. He was also selected for participation in the X-20 Dyna-Soar program.

On two separate flights, Dana flew the X-15 to an altitude above 50 miles, thereby qualifying as an astronaut according to the United States definition of the boundary of space; however, neither flight exceeded the Kármán line, the internationally accepted boundary of 100 kilometers (62 miles).

== Early life and education ==
Dana was born in Pasadena, California on November 3, 1930. He received a Bachelor of Science degree from the United States Military Academy in 1952 and served four years as a pilot in the United States Air Force. He joined NASA on October 1, 1958, after receiving a Master of Science degree in Aeronautical Engineering from the University of Southern California.

Dana married his wife Judi in 1962, and they had four children.

== Test pilot and astronaut career ==
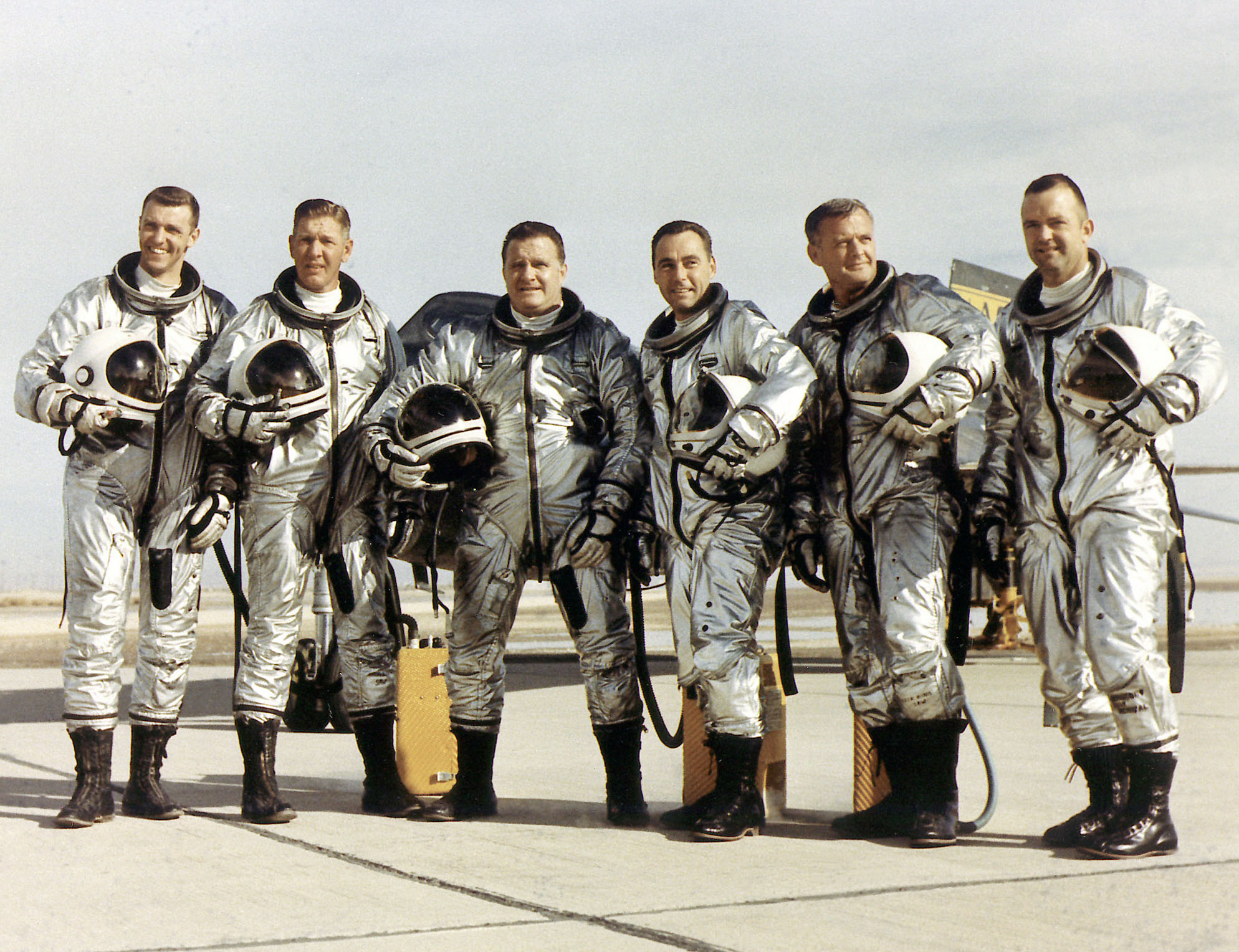
X-15 pilots (Dana: far right)

From 1960 through 1962 he was a pilot astronaut in the U.S. Air Force X-20 Dyna-Soar program. That program was canceled before the vehicle flew, but Dana later tested several other lifting-body space vehicle projects. He made one of the earliest flights in the plywood M2-F1, and flew the HL-10, the M2-F3, and the X-24B. He made the highest-ever flight in a lifting body, to 90,303 feet, in the HL-10. He also made the final powered flight of a lifting body, in the X-24B (1975).

Dana began as an engineer on the North American X-15 program. He progressed to chase pilot, and finally as project pilot on the hypersonic research aircraft. He flew the rocket-powered vehicle 16 times, reaching a top speed of 3,897 mph. His peak altitude of 307,000 feet (nearly 59 miles high) technically qualified him for the Astronaut Badge, although he was not formally recognized as an astronaut until 2005. He was the pilot on the final (199th) flight of the 10-year program.

In the late 1960s and in the 1970s, Dana was a project pilot on the manned lifting body program, which flew several versions of the wingless vehicles and produced data that helped in development of the Space Shuttle. He completed one NASA M2-F1, nine Northrop HL-10, nineteen Northrop M2-F3 and two Martin Marietta X-24B flights, for a total of 31 lifting body missions.

=== NASA career ===
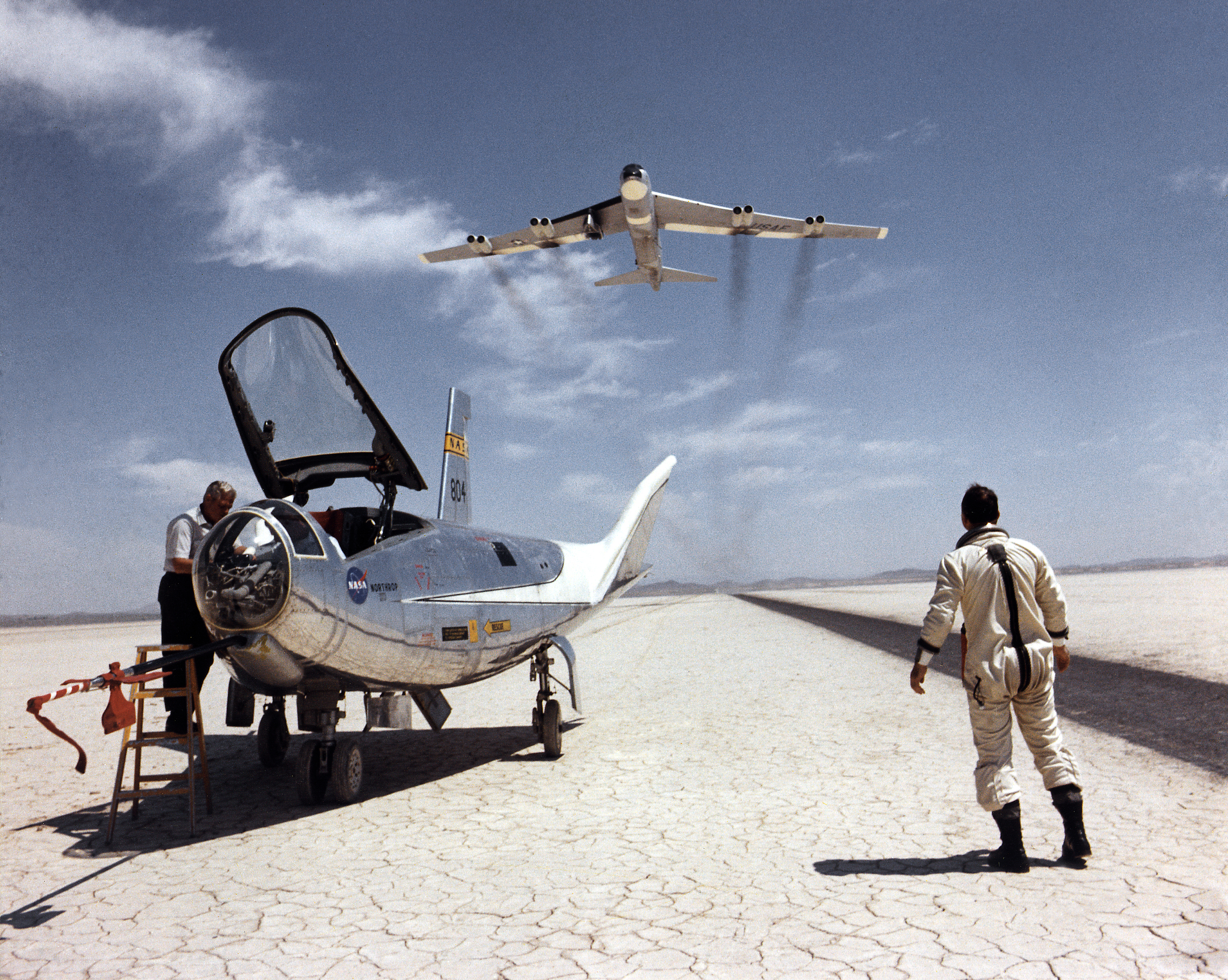
Bill Dana takes a moment to watch NASA's NB-52B cruise overhead after a research flight in the Northrop HL-10. On the left, John Reeves can be seen at the cockpit of the lifting body (1969).

Dana was Chief Engineer at NASA's Dryden Flight Research Center, Edwards Air Force Base, California, from 1993 until 1998, when he retired after almost 40 years of distinguished service to NASA. Formerly an aerospace research pilot, Dana flew the F-100 variable stability research aircraft and the Advanced Fighter Technology Integration/F-16 aircraft, as well as many others.

Before his assignment as Chief Engineer, he was Assistant Chief of the Flight Operations Division, a position he assumed after serving since 1986 as Chief Pilot. He was also a project pilot on the F-15 HIDEC (Highly Integrated Digital Electronic Control) research program, and a co-project pilot on the F-18 Hornet High Angle of Attack research program.

As a research pilot, Dana was involved in some of the most significant aeronautical programs carried out at Dryden. For his service as a flight research pilot, he received NASA Distinguished Service Medal in 1997. In 2000 he was awarded the Milton O. Thompson Lifetime Achievement Award by the Dryden Flight Research Center.

== Death ==
Dana died at age 83 in Phoenix, Arizona, on May 6, 2014, of Parkinson's disease.

== Honors ==
For his contributions to the lifting body program, Dana received the NASA Exceptional Service Medal. In 1976 he received the Haley Space Flight Award from the American Institute of Aeronautics and Astronautics (AIAA) for his research work on the M2-F3 lifting body control systems.

A member of the Society of Experimental Test Pilots, Dana is the author of several technical papers. In 1993, he was inducted into the Aerospace Walk of Honor.

=== Astronaut wings ===
During the X-15 program, eight pilots flew above 264,000 feet or 50 miles, thereby qualifying as astronauts according to the United States definition of the space border. Of these pilots, five were active-duty Air Force personnel who were awarded military astronaut wings contemporaneously with their achievements. However, the other three, including Dana, were then-current NASA employees, and did not receive a comparable decoration at the time. In 2004, the Federal Aviation Administration conferred its first-ever commercial astronaut wings on Mike Melvill and Brian Binnie, pilots of the commercial SpaceShipOne, another spaceplane with a flight profile comparable to the X-15's. Following this in 2005, NASA retroactively awarded its civilian astronaut wings to Dana (then living), and to McKay and Walker (posthumously).

== Bibliography ==
- Thompson, Milton O. (1992). At The Edge Of Space: The X-15 Flight Program, Smithsonian Institution Press, Washington and London. ISBN 1-56098-107-5
