= Rocket Engine Test Facility =

- Formerly listed on the U.S. National Register of Historic Places
- Former U.S. National Historic Landmark
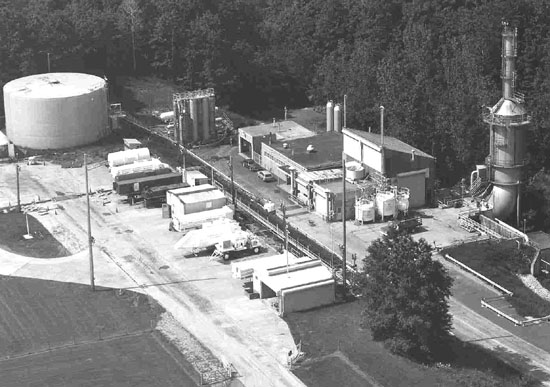
- 1982 photograph

- Location within Cleveland Location within Ohio Location within the United States
- Location: Lewis Research Center, Cleveland, Ohio
- Built: 1957
- Architect: National Advisory Committee for Aeronautics (NACA)
- NRHP reference No.: 85002800

Significant dates
- Added to NRHP: April 3, 1985
- Designated NHL: April 3, 1985
- Removed from NRHP: April 4, 2005
- Delisted NHL: April 4, 2005

Rocket Engine Test Facility was the name of a facility at the NASA Glenn Research Center, formerly known as the Lewis Research Center, in Ohio. The purpose of the Rocket Engine Test Facility was to test full-scale liquid hydrogen rockets at thrust chamber pressures of up to 2100 psia and thrust levels to at least 20,000 pounds. Work on the design of the facility began in 1954 under the auspices of NACA's Rocket Branch of the Fuels and Combustion Research Division. It was built at a cost of $2.5 million and completed in 1957. The facility was located at the south end of the center, adjacent to Abrams Creek 41.404°N 81.868°W. It was demolished in 2003 in order to make way for the runway expansion of the Cleveland Hopkins International Airport.

== Capabilities ==
It consisted of two major buildings and several support service buildings. Test Stand A was designed for sea-level testing of vertically mounted rocket engines that exhaust into an exhaust gas scrubber and muffler. The A stand had the capability of testing engines with chamber pressures up to 4300 psia and thrust levels up to 50,000 pounds.

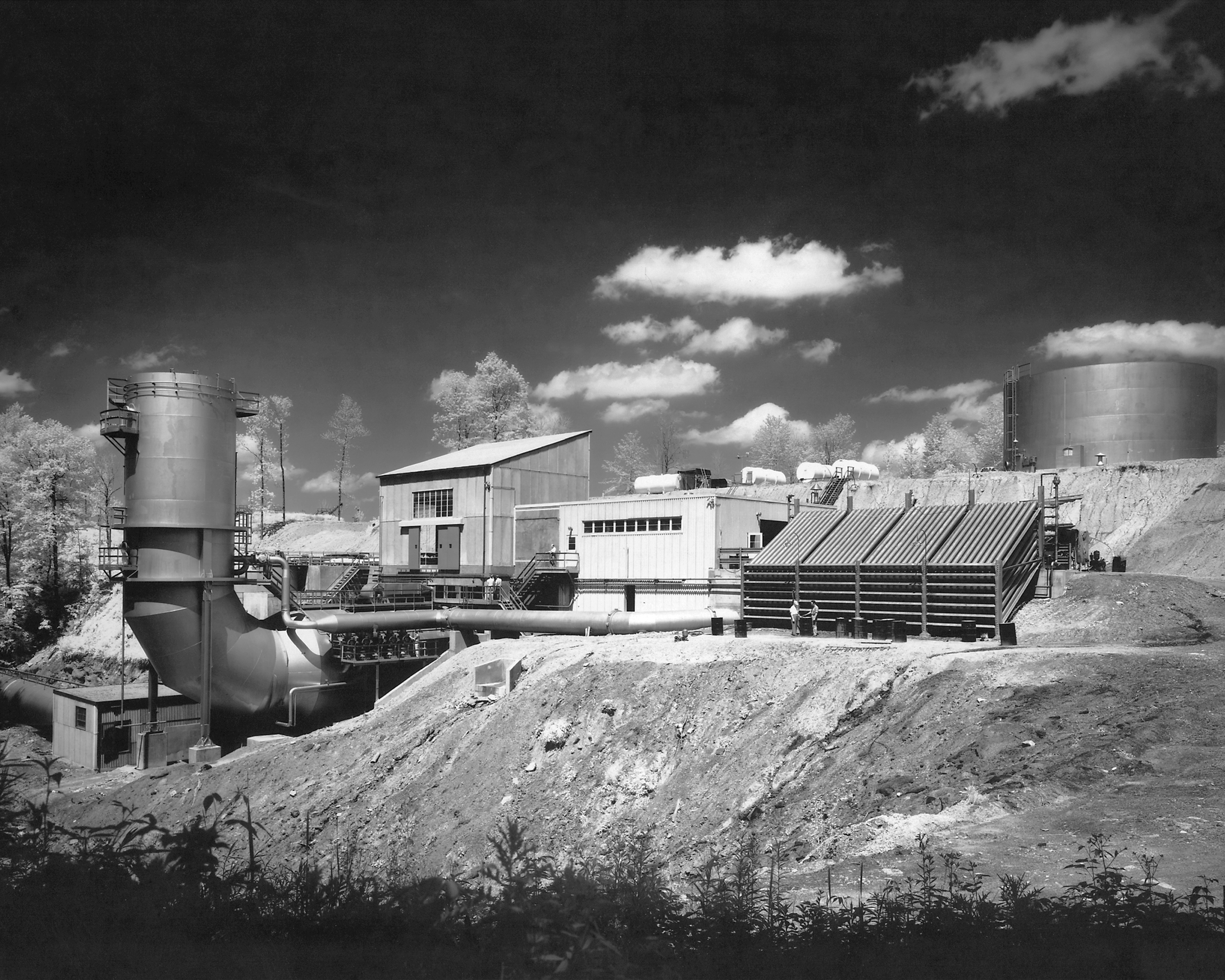
1957 photograph of the just completed Rocket Engine Test Facility

Test Stand B was designed by Anthony Fortini and Vearl N. Huff in 1959, but it was not built until after 1980. It could test horizontally mounted rocket engines exhausting into an exhaust diffuser, cooler, and a nitrogen-driven two-stage ejector system. The B stand, for altitude testing in a space environment, had the capability of testing engines with chamber pressures up to 1000 psia and thrust levels up to 1500 pounds.

The support systems included storage dewars for cryogenic fuels and a large water reservoir. Smaller buildings included a block house for observation, a pump house, a helium compressor shelter, and a liquid hydrogen pump vaporizer shelter. In 1984 the facility was modified to provide the capability for testing extremely large area ratio nozzles (to 1000:1).

Both men received awards for Test Stand B under the Space Act, as recommended by the Inventions and Contributions Board in accordance with the provisions of Section 306 of the National Aeronautics and Space Act 1958 and granted by the Administrator of NASA.

== National Historic Landmark ==
It was designated a U.S. National Historic Landmark in 1985, because of its significant role in the development of liquid hydrogen as a rocket fuel. It was used in the development of the Pratt & Whitney RL10 engine for the Centaur upper stage, as well as for the J-2 engine, with its 200,000-pound thrust, for the second stage of the Saturn V rocket. The hydrogen-oxygen engines used by the Space Shuttle were also tested in this facility. After the facility's 2003 razing, it was de-designated on April 4, 2005.
