= Octave Chanute Award =

The American Institute of Aeronautics and Astronautics, Inc. (AIAA) established the Octave Chanute Award named after Octave Chanute. Pilot(s) or test personnel that contributed to the advancement of the art, science, or technology of aeronautics received the Octave Chanute Award. The Octave Chanute Award was renamed the Chanute Flight Award in 1978 and discontinued by the AIAA in 2005. Starting in 2017, the Chanute Flight Award was re-established as the Chanute Flight Test Award. The Chanute Flight Test Award presentation occurs biennially (odd-numbered years) at the AIAA Aviation and Aeronautics Forum. The Chanute Flight Test Award is presented to recognize significant lifetime achievements in the advancement of the art, science, and technology of flight test engineering.

== Self taught ==
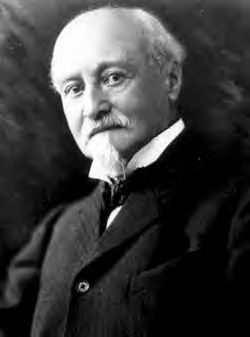
Chanute

Octave Chanute, 1832–1910, was born in France and became a naturalized American. He was a self-taught engineer. He designed the first railroad bridge over the Missouri River and the Union Stock Yards in Chicago (IL) as well as those in Kansas City (MO). Octave Chanute was a pioneer aeronautical engineer and experimenter, and was a friend and adviser to the Wright Brothers.

== Aeronautical pioneer ==
Chanute waged a long campaign to encourage the invention of the airplane. He collected information from every possible source and gave it to anyone who asked. He published a compendium of aviation information in 1894. In 1896 he commissioned several aircraft to be built. The Katydid had multiple wings that could be attached variously about the fuselage for ease of experimentation. Chanute's biplane glider (1896) with "two arched wings held rigidly together by vertical struts and diagonal wire bracing" (the principle of the Pratt truss used in the railroad bridges which Chanute constructed) served as a prototype design for subsequent airplanes.

== Chanute Flight Test Award recipients ==
- 1939 Edmund T. Allen, Boeing engineer and test pilot
- 1940 Howard Hughes, engineer and test pilot
- 1941 Melvin N. Gough, NACA engineer, test pilot
- 1942 A. L. MacClain, Pratt & Whitney test pilot
- 1943 William H. McAvoy, NACA engineer, test pilot
- 1944 Benjamin S. Kelsey, U.S. Army Air Force engineer, test pilot
- 1945 Robert T. Lamson, Boeing test pilot
- 1945 Albert "Elliot" Merrill, Boeing test pilot
- 1946 Captain Ernest A Cutrell, American Airlines test pilot
- 1947 Lawrence A. Clousing, NACA engineer and test pilot
- 1948 Herbert H. Hoover, NACA test pilot
- 1949 Vice Admiral Frederick M. Trapnell, United States Navy pioneering naval aviator and test pilot
- 1950 Captain Donald B. MacDiarmid, United States Coast Guard naval aviator
- 1951 Major General Marion E. Carl, United States Marine Corps naval aviator and test pilot
- 1952 John C. Seal, Cornell Aeronautical Laboratory test pilot
- 1953 William B. Bridgeman, Douglas Aircraft Company test pilot
- 1954 George E. Cooper, NACA engineer and test pilot
- 1955 Major General Albert Boyd, United States Air Force test pilot
- 1956 Alvin M. Johnston, Boeing test pilot
- 1957 Brigadier General Frank Kendall Everest Jr., United States Air Force test pilot
- 1958 Albert Scott Crossfield, North American Aviation engineer and test pilot
- 1959 John P. Reeder, NASA, engineer and test pilot
- 1960 Dr. Joseph P. Tymczyszyn, Federal Aviation Administration engineer and test pilot
- 1961 Joseph A. Walker, NASA engineer and test pilot
- 1962 Neil A. Armstrong, NASA engineer and test pilot
- 1963 Captain Edward J. Bechtold, Eastern Air Lines pilot
- 1964 Robert C. Innis, NASA engineer and test pilot
- 1964 Fred J Drinkwater, NASA engineer and test pilot
- 1965 Alvin S. White, North American Aviation engineer and test pilot
- 1966 John L. Swigert, North American Aviation engineer and test pilot
- 1966 Donald F. McCusker, North American Aviation engineer and test pilot
- 1967 Milton O. Thompson, NASA, engineer and test pilot
- 1968 Colonel William J. Knight, United States Air Force engineer and test pilot
- 1969 William C. Park, Lockheed test pilot
- 1970 Colonel Jerauld R. Gentry United States Air Force engineer and test pilot
- 1971 William M. Magruder, Federal Aviation Administration program manager, engineer, and test pilot
- 1972 Donald R. Segner, Lockheed engineer and test pilot
- 1973 Major General Cecil W. Powell, United States Air Force engineer and test pilot
- 1974 Lt. Colonel Charles A. Sewell, Grumman engineer and test pilot
- 1975 Captain Alan L. Bean, NASA, engineer and astronaut
- 1975 Colonel Jack R. Lousma, NASA, engineer and astronaut
- 1975 Dr. Owen K. Garriott, NASA, engineer and astronaut
- 1976 Lt. General Thomas P. Stafford, United States Air Force engineer and astronaut
- 1978 Tommie D. Benefield, North American Rockwell engineer and test pilot
- 1979 Colonel Austin J. Bailey
- 1981 Raymond L. McPherson, Boeing test pilot
- 1983 S. L Wallick, Jr., Boeing engineer and test pilot
- 1986 George R. Jansen, Douglas Aircraft Company test pilot.
- 1988 Russell C. Larson, NASA engineer and pilot
- 1990 William G Schweikhard, University of Kansas
- 1992 Robert A. Hoover, Evergreen International test pilot
- 1994 Richard Abrams, Lockheed executive
- 1996 Edward T Schneider, NASA, engineer and test pilot
- 1998 Harold C Farley, Lockheed, engineer and test pilot
- 2002 Mike Carriker, Boeing engineer and test pilot
- 2017 William R. Gray, United States Air Force engineer and test pilot
- 2019 David W. Minto
- 2022 Rogers E. Smith, SR-71 Pilot and Test Pilot

== See also ==
- List of aviation awards
- History of aviation § Picking up the pace
