= HL-42 (spacecraft) =

Proposed spacecraft

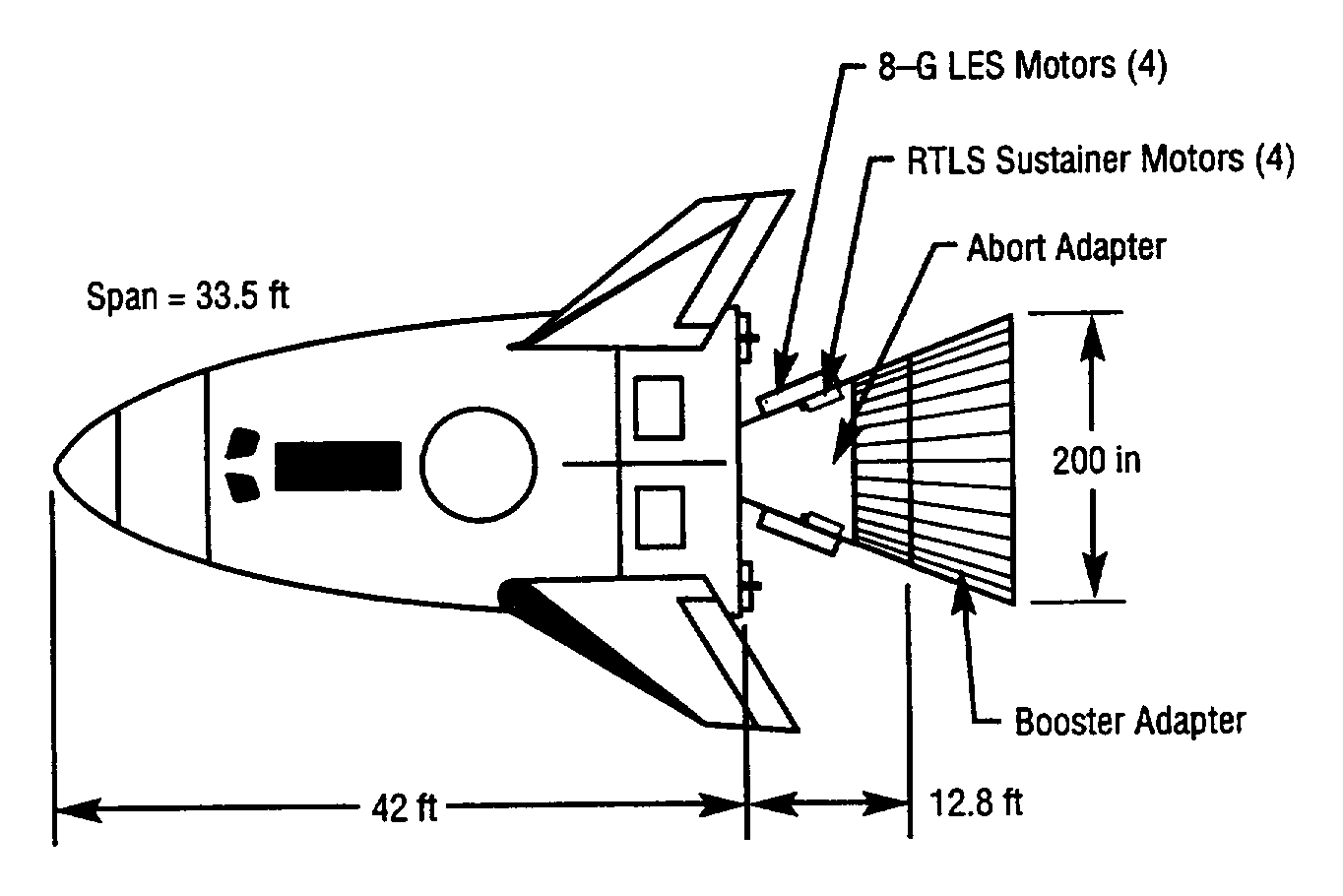
- NASA schematic from Access to Space Study
- Operator: NASA
- Applications: Crewed spaceplane

Specifications
- Launch mass: 29 tonnes, including adapters
- Regime: Low Earth orbit

Production
- Status: Cancelled
- Launched: 0

Related spacecraft
- Derived from: HL-20 Personnel Launch System

The HL-42 was a proposed scaled-up version of the HL-20 re-usable crewed spaceplane design, which had been developed from 1983 to 1991 at NASA's Langley Research Center but never flown. Like the HL-20 ("Horizontal Lander 20"), the HL-42 would have been launched into low Earth orbit mounted on top of a two-stage expendable rocket. At the end of the mission, it would have re-entered and glided to a runway landing.

The HL-42 was suggested as one possible successor to the Space Shuttle in the 1994 NASA Access to Space Study. However, another alternative, a Single-stage-to-orbit design, was chosen for further development, and work on the HL-42 was abandoned.

== Background: NASA launch policy ==
In the early 1980s, it had been NASA policy to promote the use of the Space Shuttle for almost all civilian and military launches; only then, with Shuttle missions taking off almost every week, would the Space Shuttle program make economic sense. However, the Challenger disaster in 1986 forced a reconsideration, and in the following years, many studies attempted to chart a way forward without reaching any consensus except for a growing feeling that "faster, better, cheaper" would be a good idea. There was also disagreement over the design (and indeed purpose) of the proposed Space Station Freedom.

== The Access to Space Study of 1994 ==
Finally, as President Clinton took office for the first time in January 1993, the new NASA Administrator Daniel Goldin commissioned a major study that would reduce the multitude of possibilities to three well-defined options for launch systems.

In November 1993, while that study was still underway, an agreement was reached with Russia to develop the Freedom design into the International Space Station, so for Space Station operations the study authors were told to design for the 'worst case': Assume a 4-person Station like Freedom that would have been built and maintained solely by the US, but put it in a Mir orbit with an inclination of 51.6 degrees (a significant change, as this would be more difficult to reach from Cape Canaveral and would reduce the Shuttle's payload by one third). (Note: Freedom would have been constructed in an orbit with an inclination of 28.5 degrees, the same as the latitude of the Shuttle launch pad at Cape Canaveral; visiting Shuttles could then be launched due East to gain maximum advantage from the eastward rotation of the Earth.) On the other hand, the new era of cooperation with Russia would make it easier to buy and use the promising Russian first-stage engines of the RD-170 / RD-180 family and the innovative tri-propellant RD-701.

The NASA Office of Space Systems Development published this Access to Space Study in January 1994; it had a major influence on space policy for the rest of the decade. The study aimed for the chosen new launch hardware to be introduced starting from 2005 as the current Shuttles approached retirement and to remain in use until 2030. Three expert teams each mapped out a possible path ahead:

=== Option 1: Continue to be Shuttle-based until 2030, but with upgrades ===
Option 1 was the most conservative, consisting of incremental upgrades to the existing Shuttle fleet and possibly constructing several more Shuttles using lighter, stronger materials. Vastly improved avionics could make uncrewed, autonomous operations practical and desirable for some missions.

=== Option 2: Conservative engineering, expendable launchers, and some new vehicles including the HL-42 ===
Option 2, slightly more adventurous and focused on economy and efficiency, would involve new vehicles but only small advances on existing materials and methods. Team 2 planned to use only technology expected to be readily available in 1997 and to have the new hardware ready for service in 2005.

All launch vehicles will be expendable in the recommended version of Option 2. Delta II would be retained; Atlas II would be upgraded with a Russian RD-180 engine; and the heavy Titan IV and Shuttle would be replaced by a new heavy launcher (using RD-180 engines and a J-2S-powered upper stage), which would support all Space Station operations using either a disposable uncrewed Automated Transfer Vehicle (for cargo) or the HL-42 re-usable spaceplane (for crew).

=== Option 3: Go straight for Single-stage-to-orbit (SSTO) ===
Option 3 was ambitious, but Team 3 felt the time had come for a new generation of large, fully re-usable single-stage-to-orbit (SSTO) launchers. They had been impressed by the April 1993 roll-out of the McDonnell Douglas DC-X and its central philosophy of drastically simplified "airline-like operations". Indeed, they concluded their part of the study with this italicized credo: The bottom line is this: operability must not be simply a goal; it must be THE design driver.

Team 3 investigated several air-breathing, horizontal take-off alternatives building on the experience of the Rockwell X-30 (NASP) project but concluded that the future lay with an all-rocket, vertical take-off, horizontal-landing SSTO design. Their reference design used the proposed but unbuilt Russian RD-704 tri-propellant engines, small wings, and a cylindrical fuselage with a central Shuttle-style payload bay. This could carry cargo or passengers, but the operation would be fully automated in both cases. The team calculated that the first operational vehicle could be delivered in 2007, with a fleet of four ready to take over all Delta, Atlas and Shuttle operations by 2011.

This final reference design strongly resembled the X-2000 Advanced Technology Demonstrator proposed in August 1993 by a group at NASA's Marshall Space Flight Center.

=== Final recommendation: Develop technology for SSTO ===
After analysis, the study decided on Option 3: "Adopt the development of an advanced technology, fully reusable single-stage-to-orbit rocket vehicle as an Agency goal." "It has the greatest potential for reducing annual operations costs as well as life-cycle costs ... it would place the U.S. in an extremely advantageous position concerning international competition and would leapfrog the U.S. into a next-generation launch capability."

As for commercial satellite launches, it was felt that even Option 2 would have difficulty competing against Ariane 4 and Ariane 5, identified as being "the most efficient of the foreign systems". "Option 3, on the other hand, would lower launch costs so dramatically that the U.S. industry could underprice all competitors. The U.S. would likely capture, and once again dominate, the international satellite launch market for a considerable period, utilizing these unique advanced technology vehicles."

Option 3 was recognised as presenting "moderate to high technical risk", but this "was felt to be manageable due to the 4 to 5 year technology maturation phase which would develop and demonstrate the needed technologies to at least a level 6 technology readiness level (proven in their operating environment)."

=== Outcome: Failure of hopes for SSTO ===
Once the decision had been made to concentrate on SSTO, NASA lost interest in the HL-42 and, indeed, in the whole concept of launching a crewed spaceplane on top of an expendable launcher. The last HL-20 studies based at NASA's Langley Research Center had been done in 1991, and they were not continued.

NASA now took over the DC-X from the Pentagon and renamed it the DC-XA Clipper Graham. Two new projects were also started as technology demonstrators: the Orbital Sciences X-34 and the Lockheed Martin X-33. Once the technology had been proved, the next step would have been VentureStar, a commercial SSTO spaceplane.

However, the "4 to 5 year technology maturation phase" failed. The DC-XA was cancelled in 1996 after the prototype was badly damaged in a landing accident, and the X-34 and X-33 were both cancelled in 2001 after disagreements and technical difficulties. Work on VentureStar also ceased in 2001, effectively ending the push towards SSTO.

== The HL-42 in Option 2 ==
=== Option 2D launch system in detail ===
Team 2 arrived at their conclusions after an exhaustive examination of many possibilities, starting with 84 vehicle families, narrowing this to 28, then to four, of which three included the HL-42 crewed spaceplane. Their final detailed recommendation (Option 2D in the Study) was as follows:

- For 5 tonne to low Earth orbit (LEO) missions, continue to use the Delta II (considered reliable and good value for money).
- For 10 tonne to LEO missions, replace the Atlas II with a new launcher using one "low-cost, low-risk" Russian RD-180 engine on the first stage, and a newly developed Centaur upper stage with a single RL10 engine instead of two.
- For heavier Titan IV or Shuttle-class payloads, retire the expensive Titans and develop a new two-stage expendable heavy launcher, with three Russian RD-180 engines in the first stage and a single J-2S in the second (which would in effect be an upgraded S-IVB stage). This new launcher would be able to lift about 38 tonnes to LEO without an upper (third) stage.

The heavy launcher could then carry:

- the new 23-tonne single-engine Centaur upper stage plus a geostationary satellite or an interplanetary spacecraft;
- 8 tonnes of disposable adapter and escape system plus the 21-tonne fully loaded HL-42 to LEO;
- the disposable 7-tonne ESA-built ATV plus up to 30 tonnes of cargo or structure to the Space Station in LEO.

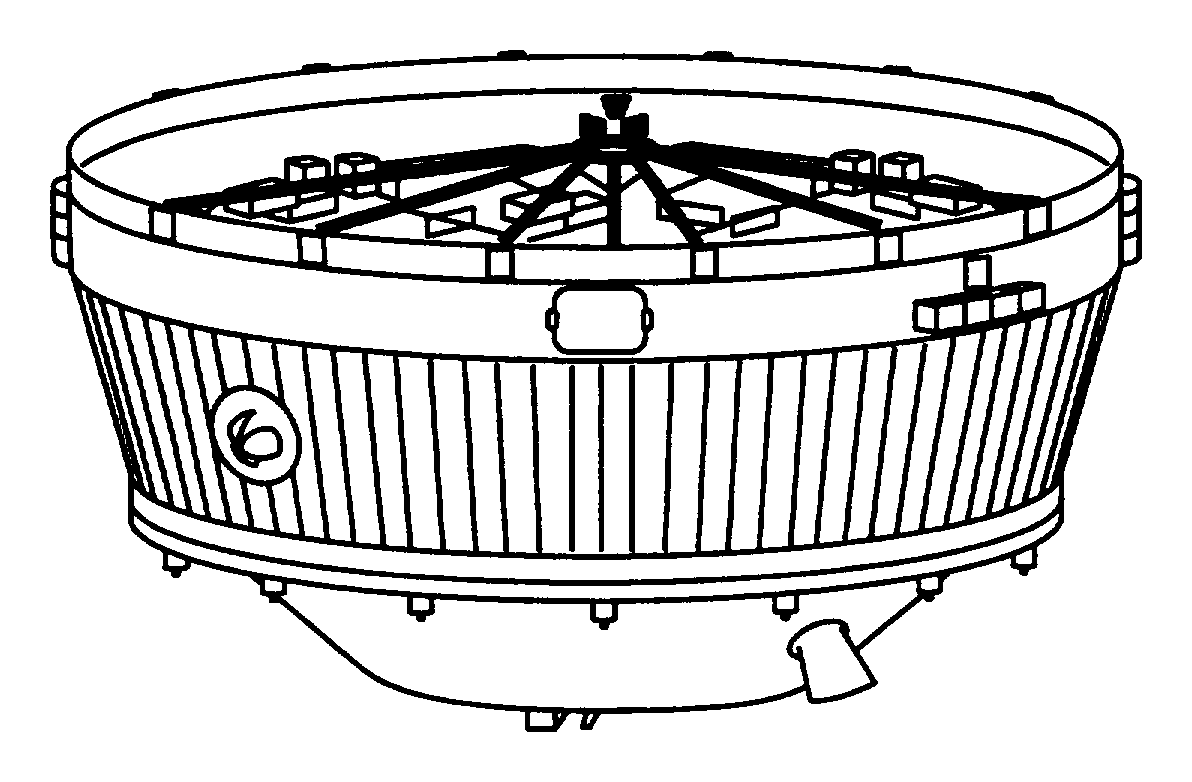
ATV partner of HL-42

At this stage the ATV would have been a short, squat orbital tug with no storage space, similar to the Service Module section of the later operational ESA Automated Transfer Vehicle. This tug could propel:

- a Pressurized Logistics Module (PLM) with a large CBM-sized docking port;
- an Unpressurized Logistics Carrier (ULC) with fuel and gas tanks;
- complete new modules and truss structures for the Space Station itself.

The teams had been told to assume that maintaining a 4-person Freedom-class Station would need 70 tonnes of up-going cargo each year. In Option 2, most of this would be carried out in five ATV missions (three PLM and two ULC). Waste for disposal would be loaded into the ATV/PLM or ATV/ULC, which would then de-orbit and burn up on re-entry. If necessary, the ATV could also de-orbit whole damaged or obsolete Space Station modules or structures.

The launch system aimed for economy and efficiency, with common components (the RD-180 engines, the Centaur upper stage) used as far as possible. The ATV would have been provided at European expense in exchange for some use of the Space Station; in this cost-effective way, ESA could preserve a foothold in space after the cancellation of the Columbus program in 1991. Even the ATV launch fairing was borrowed from the Titan IV.

Six new vehicles or "program elements" would be required:

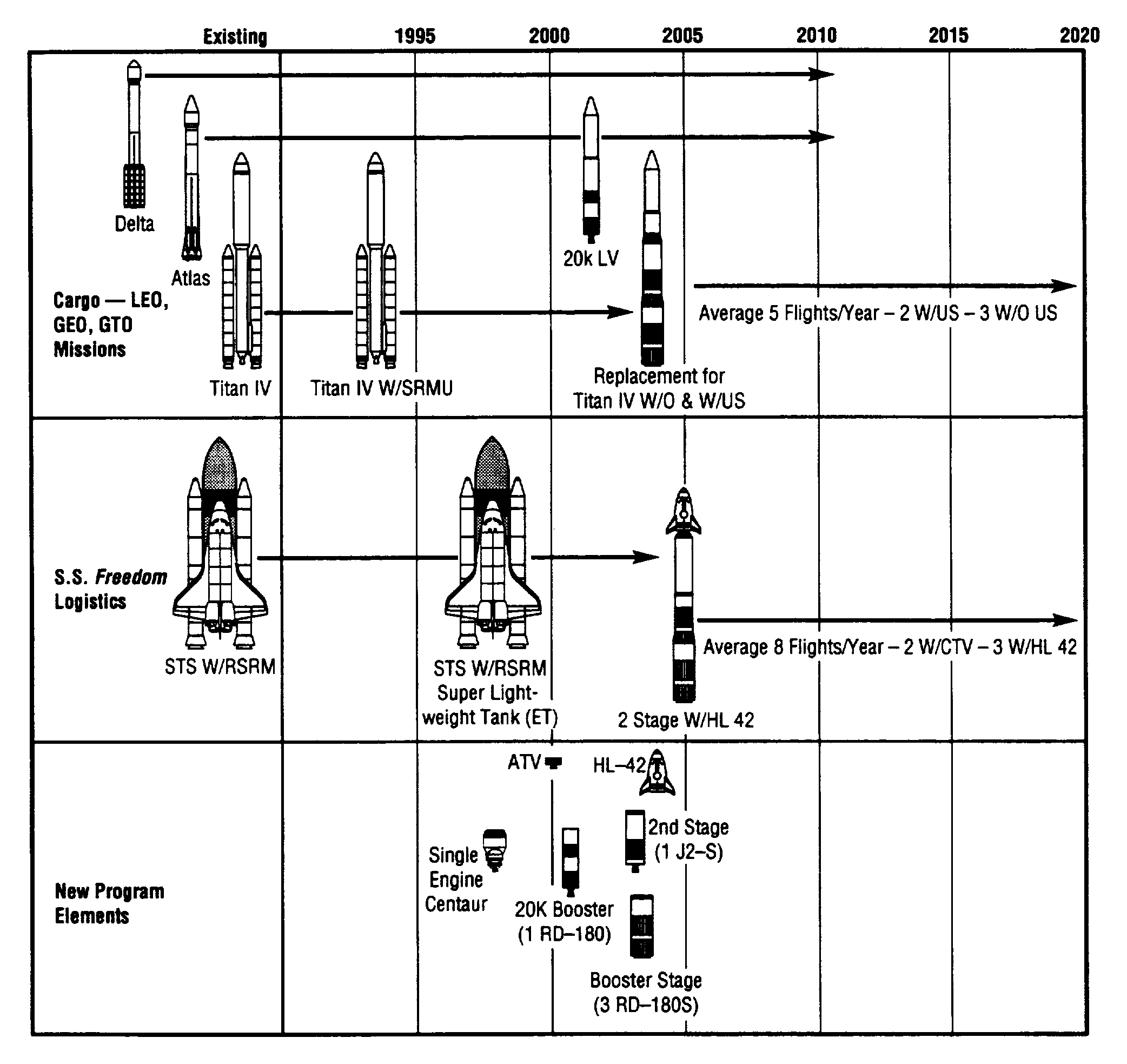
Figure 24 from the Access to Space Study Summary Report

Notably, many of the Option 2 recommendations were put into practice in later years despite this option not being selected. Three of the proposed new vehicles were built and widely used. (Note: The Delta II did continue in use for two more decades, and its final mission in 2018 completed a run of 100 consecutive successful launches. The RD-180 upgrade to the Atlas II (labelled "20k LV" in Fig. 24) first flew in 2000 as the Atlas III, earlier than envisaged in Fig 24, and both the RD-180 engine and the single-RL10 Centaur upper stage became workhorses of the US launch industry for the next two decades. The ATV evolved into the operational ESA ATV and then into the proposed Orion Service Module. The idea of an upgraded J-2 second stage has long existed. Only the triple RD-180 heavy launcher and the HL-42 itself were not pursued.)

=== How big should the HL-42 be? The down mass problem ===
Team 2 gave a great deal of thought to the question of downmass, cargo that would have to be returned safely to Earth (mainly equipment and completed experiments). This presented no problem for Options 1 and 3; the Shuttle could easily carry down mass, for example, in a Multi-Purpose Logistics Module (MPLM) in its payload bay, and VentureStar would have a similar system. In Option 2D, however, all down mass would have to be carried in the HL-42, which would need to be larger than the HL-20 to give some cargo capacity and crew seats. But how much capacity (volume and mass) would be needed in practice?

Since Freedom existed so far only on paper, it was hard to estimate this because there was no practical experience. The Russian space stations had sent down hardly any return mass since the disposable Progress cargo modules were designed to burn up on re-entry, and the cramped three-person Soyuz re-entry modules had little room to spare. (Note: The Russians did develop the VBK-Raduga, a small re-entry capsule that was used to return cargo from Mir on ten occasions between 1990 and 1994. The Raduga was carried up as internal cargo on Progress-M. At the end of the mission, after the disposable Progress had undocked from Mir, the Raduga was ejected from Progress, re-entered separately, and descended by parachute. However, each Raduga could carry only 150 kg.) But Freedom and the ISS program were much more ambitious and envisaged returning large biological and especially industrial-processing user experiments regularly.

Many of these experiments would be fitted into a bulky ISS International Standard Payload Rack (ISPR), too big even to fit through a Progress or Soyuz probe-and-drogue docking port. To load even one ISPR, the HL-42 would need a docking port of the same size as the 1300 mm (51-inch) Common Berthing Mechanism ports that would eventually interconnect the US-made modules of the Station. And how many ISPRs would it need to accommodate on each flight?

Initially, the teams were given a baseline figure of 58 tonnes of downmass per year (compared with the 70 tonnes of upmass), and this would have posed a major problem for Option 2: "However, the central issue relative to access to space is the return mass." With hindsight, 58 tonnes seems unnecessarily large, and indeed, immediate analysis by Langley Research Center (LaRC) showed that it could be reduced to 30 tonnes "by judicious return of spares, user, and crew systems."

This was still inconveniently large for Option 2, so LaRC went to work again and determined that by giving priority to the user experiments and throwing away almost everything else that was no longer of use, the annual downmass could be reduced to 10 tonnes or roughly 15% of the upmass. This figure was used to calculate the required size of the HL-42.

Given three crew-rotation missions per year, each must carry between three and four tonnes of down cargo. Team 2 calculated that this could be done by scaling up the HL-20 design by a factor of 1.42, coincidentally giving it a length of 42 feet (and the name HL-42). The combined mass of crew and cargo was set at 4.2 tonnes.

The baseline annual up cargo manifest would then look like this:

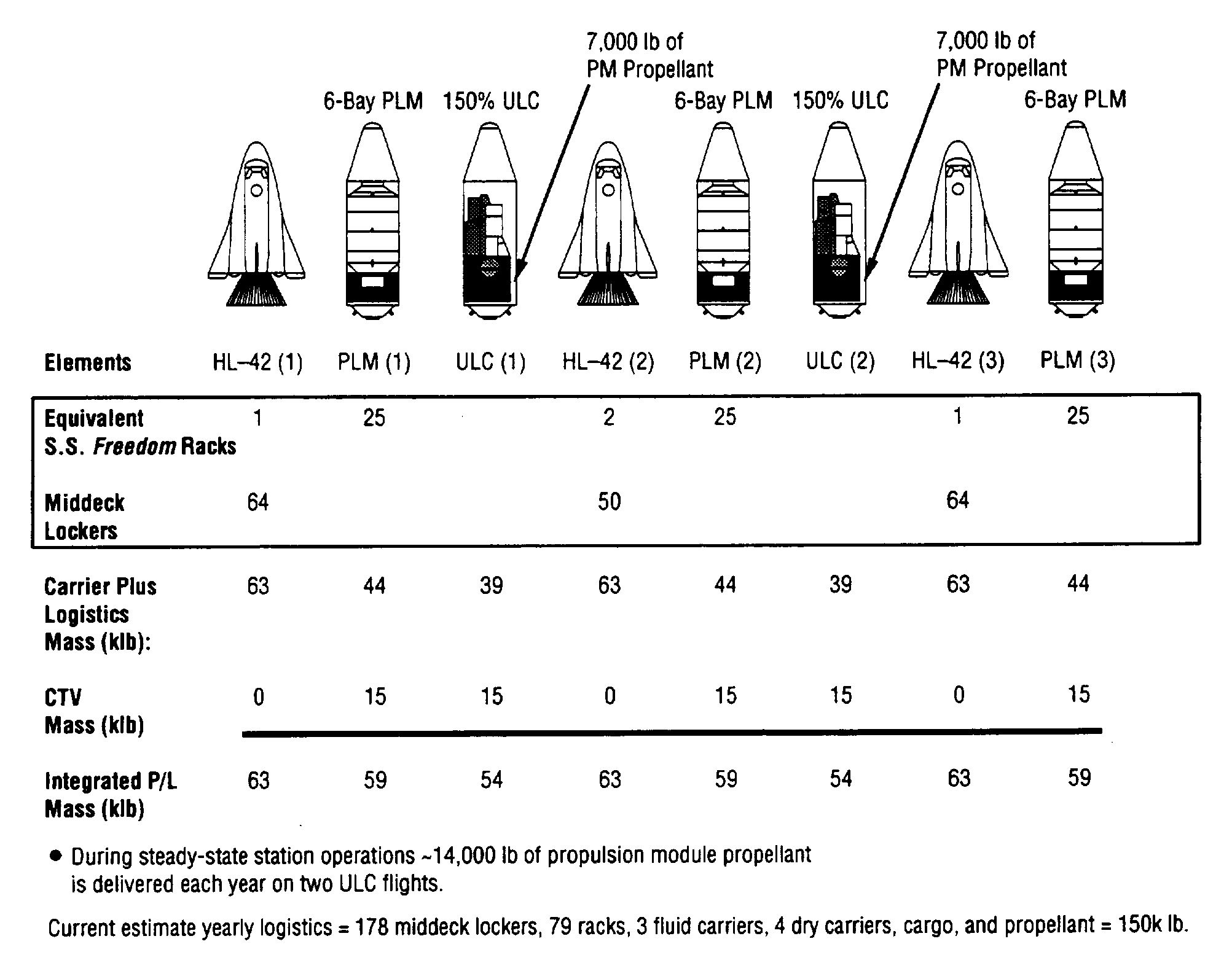
Figure 19 from the Access to Space Study Summary Report

On the downward journey, this manifest would return 78 mid-deck lockers, all extravehicular activity suits, and approximately 65 percent of the user pressurized racks (ISPRs).

According to Fig. 19, the HL-42 would carry one or two ISPRs on routine upward flights, but diagrams of its internal arrangement show stowage for three.

The system was designed to be flexible. If experience revealed a need for extra down mass at some times, extra HL-42 flights could be scheduled, or the sequence could be changed. Since all three vehicles used the same new heavy launcher, this would cause minimum disruption to launch processing.

Team 2 was very much aware that their minimal down mass provision might attract criticism: "The acceptability of this level of return (approximately 15 percent of delivered mass) represents an issue that should be addressed in the final Space Station Freedom logistics scenario." However, later ISS experience suggested that this would not have been a problem.

The HL-42 had about the same cargo capacity as the later uncrewed SpaceX Dragon, and for at least five years after the retirement of the Shuttle in July 2011 the Dragon was the only craft capable of carrying significant downmass from the ISS. The actual downmass figures for its first four Commercial Resupply Services missions CRS-1 to CRS-4 were 0.9 tonnes, 1.4 tonnes, 1.6 tonnes, and 1.5 tonnes, over the three years from 2012 to 2014. This suggests that the HL-42 would indeed have had sufficient capacity, especially with three flights a year. (Note: The downmass problem is complicated by the question of cargo volume. Comparison of space station cargo vehicles reveals that the Dragon and the Progress both allow about 3 m^{3} per tonne of upmass. Experience has shown that this is too small; the volume of the capsule is often filled before the mass limit is reached. Therefore in 2014, in its preparations for the Commercial Resupply Services 2 contract, NASA specified an allowance nearer to 4 m^{3} per tonne (50–70 m^{3} for 14.25–16.75 tonnes) for upmass. For the same amount of downmass, NASA advised 70–90 m^{3}, giving an allowance of roughly 5 m^{3} per tonne for downmass (because on-orbit packing is inevitably less efficient than ground packing). For the HL-42, a full 3.5-tonne load of downmass would thus be likely to occupy 15–20 m^{3}. The "habitable volume" of the HL-42 was given as 16.40 m^{3}, though it is not clear if this included the insides of storage lockers and similar spaces. It does however suggest that for the HL-42 the amount of down-cargo might have been limited in practice by its bulk rather than its mass.) It would also have given the down-cargo a gentler ride than the Dragon (1.5g deceleration compared to 3.5g for the Dragon) and a much more convenient landing on a runway (rather than the Pacific Ocean splashdown of the Dragon).

=== Safety advantages of the HL-42 ===
Since the Challenger disaster in 1986 it had been recognised that the Shuttle was not safe enough. The Study estimated its current "crew survivability" at 0.98. (Note: This turned out to be an accurate assessment. With 133 successes out of 135 missions over the lifetime of the Shuttle, the actual figure was 0.985.) One of the aims of the Study was to increase this to 0.999.

However, despite examining many possible Shuttle upgrades extending as far as 2030, Team 1 could not find a practical way of providing crew escape. The only effective way of making the whole system significantly safer would have been to upgrade the Shuttle's avionics and enable autonomous operation, to avoid risking lives on missions that were essentially just cargo delivery: "Providing additional crew escape capability was not recommended due to cost, weight, and center of gravity impacts, and technical risks. Several means to reduce costs further and increase flight safety were identified. One is an uncrewed orbiter, which would allow the flight rate to increase without impacting human safety ...". However, even if half the missions had been uncrewed, this would only have halved the risk and increased "survivability" to 0.99, still an order of magnitude worse than the target of 0.999.

The general principle of improving safety by separating crew and cargo (not risking lives on cargo missions) had already been studied by NASA for several years before the study, and Option 2 was designed this way from the start. The HL-42 would only be flown when crew rotation was necessary. This also meant that the cargo-only hardware (ATV, PLM, ULC) did not need to be human-rated, making the whole system cheaper.

Being much smaller than the Shuttle, the HL-42 could be mounted on top of its launcher, so on the pad and for the first minute of flight a simple launch escape system (LES) could "provide a high-thrust impulse to rapidly distance the HL-42 from a catastrophic booster event" and allow it to glide back to a runway near the launch-pad. (Note: This demanding manoeuvre had never been performed before, but several NASA studies (including some trials with a T-38 trainer) showed that it would be practical for the HL-20. The total time from "catastrophic event" to runway landing would be about two minutes.)

To deal with a "catastrophic event" in the next few minutes of flight, there would be an option to fit the launch adapter (between the rear of the HL-42 and the top of the launcher second stage) with larger solid rocket motors, to provide a boost-back and a Return To Launch Site (RTLS) intact abort.

If the accident happened beyond RTLS range, the LES would push the HL-42 clear and be jettisoned, and the HL-42 itself would glide back into the lower atmosphere. If no suitable long runways (possibly even at large commercial airports) were within reach, it would deploy parachutes and splash-down in the ocean. Since all the manoeuvring engines in the HL-42 itself used non-toxic methane fuel and liquid oxygen (rather than the toxic hypergolic fuels of the Shuttle) there would be no need for a runway "safing" procedure after any of these emergency landings, and less danger in a crash-landing.

The HL-42 would have survived the circumstances that destroyed the Shuttles Challenger in 1986 and Columbia in 2003. In 1986 the LES would have pulled it clear of the booster explosion; and on top of its launcher it would have been safely out of the way of the falling debris that fatally damaged the thermal insulation on Columbia.

These considerations led the study to conclude that Team 2 had met the safety target with the HL-42: "The improvement of crew safety (probability of crew survival) to at least 0.999 from the 0.98 of the Space Shuttle was met or exceeded by the new vehicles of Options 2 and 3."

== Design ==
The HL-42 drew indirectly on three decades of experience with lifting body spaceplanes, but depended mainly on its immediate predecessor, the HL-20. Team 2 described the background of their design as follows: "The HL-42 design stems directly from the HL-20 lifting body vehicle concept under study since 1983 at Langley Research Center. It is a 42 percent dimensional scale-up of the HL-20, and retains key design and operational features of the HL-20 design. The applicable HL-20 design data base includes extensive NASA aerodynamic, flight simulation and abort, and human-factors research, as well as results of contracted studies with Rockwell, Lockheed, and Boeing in defining efficient manufacturing and operations design."

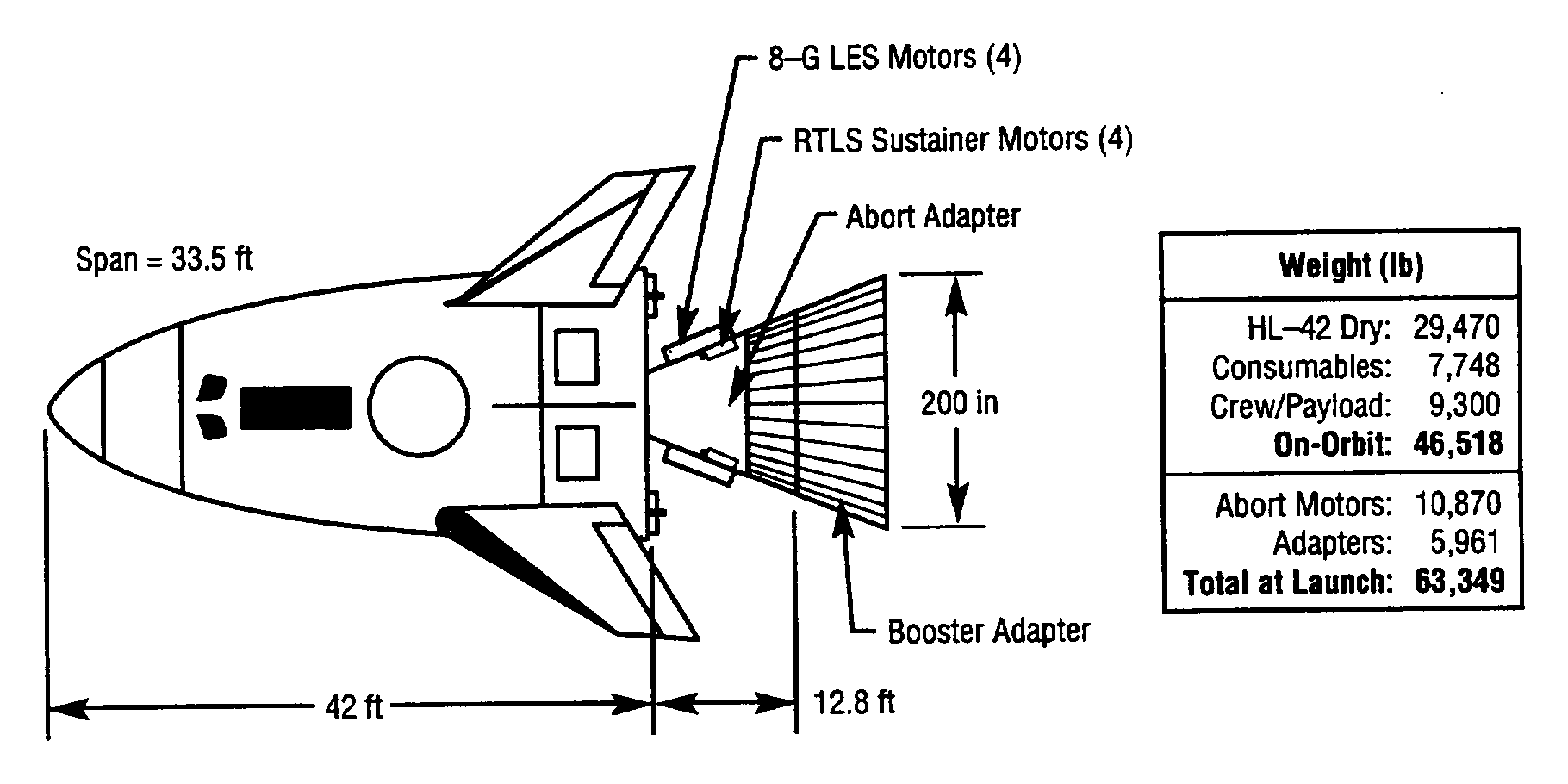
Figure 21 from the Access to Space Study Summary Report

=== Structure and thermal protection ===
Option 2 was based on technology available for practical use in 1997, so the HL-42 used many of the same materials as the Shuttle; it had a structural skeleton of aluminium alloy, and a very similar thermal protection system.

The structural core of the HL-42 was the cylindrical aluminium pressure-cabin, with two access hatches: a large one at the rear for docking with the Space Station after the launch adapter had been jettisoned (and for pre-launch horizontal cargo-loading), and a much smaller hatch on the roof of the cabin for crew access while vertical on the launch pad (and as an alternative exit after landing, especially after parachuting to an emergency ocean splash-down). Aluminium frames extended from either side of this strong cylindrical core to support the rest of the structure.

The whole lower surface of the lifting-body was protected from the heat of re-entry by Toughened Unipiece Fibrous Insulation (TUFI) tiles, a tougher, more impact-resistant version of the Shuttle's HRSI tiles; the upgraded TUFI tiles came into use in 1996. These tiles, matte black like those on the Shuttle, were bonded directly to a multi-piece titanium heat-resistant skin mounted on the aluminium frames. (Note: On the Shuttle, the skin was aluminium, and the tiles were bonded to felt Strain Isolation Pads which in turn were glued to the skin. This system isolated the fragile, brittle tiles from the thermal expansion of the aluminium and any general flexing of the structure. The titanium used on the HL-42 would have expanded only one-third as much as aluminium, making the isolation pads unnecessary. This did, however, introduce a new problem, because the titanium skin would expand much less than the aluminium frame structure inside it. This is why the skin had to be made in separate pieces that could move apart, to allow for the differential expansion of the two metals.)

The upper surface skin, exposed to much lower temperatures, was made of aluminium honeycomb panels that could be removed to allow access to the unpressurised equipment bays between the frames. The upper skin was covered with the same insulating white fabric (AFRSI, Nomex Advanced Felt Reusable Surface Insulation) as the upper surfaces of the Shuttle.

The fins were made entirely of titanium, with both TUFI tiles (in hotter areas) and AFRSI fabric (in cooler areas) directly bonded to the skin .

The hottest areas of all, the nose-cap and the leading edges of the fins, were made of reinforced carbon–carbon, as they were on the Shuttle.

=== Propulsion: OMS and RCS with methane fuel ===
The on-orbit propulsion systems of the HL-42 looked superficially like those of the Shuttle, on a smaller scale. At the rear, one on each side of the access hatch, were two Space Shuttle Orbital Maneuvering System (OMS) engines, used to adjust the orbit, rendezvous with other spacecraft, and finally de-orbit. The fully fuelled OMS was capable of giving the HL-42 a total velocity change (delta-v) of 290 m/s, similar to the 300 m/s figure for the Shuttle.

The reaction control system (RCS) was also similar in principle to that of the Shuttle, a system of small rocket engines to control the attitude of the HL-42 in pitch, roll and yaw, using the same fuel as the OMS. This meant that in case of an OMS engine failure the remaining fuel could be sent through an interconnect to the rear-facing RCS engines to complete an emergency de-orbit burn.

However, there was one major difference between the Shuttle and the HL-42: the type of fuel. The Shuttle used the toxic and hypergolic monomethylhydrazine (MMH) and dinitrogen tetroxide (N_{2}O_{4}) for both OMS and RCS. In keeping with the new "faster, better, cheaper" airline-style operations principle, Team 2 decided to switch to methane (CH_{4}) and liquid oxygen for both OMS and RCS. Although these are non-toxic and much easier to handle, it was a step into the unknown, as in 1994 hardly any work had yet been done on methane–lox engines. This was therefore listed as the fourth of the five Advanced Development Tasks Required for Option 2.

=== Aerodynamic control surfaces ===
Like the HL-20, the HL-42 had seven movable control surfaces: an elevon on each side fin, an all-moving central rudder between the fins, and four body flaps (two on the lower surface at the rear and two on the upper surface between the rudder and the fins). Compared to the Shuttle, the HL-42 relied far more on the two lower body flaps for pitch and roll control, particularly in the middle stages of re-entry with high dynamic pressures and a high angle of attack. In this respect, the HL-20 and the HL-42 were halfway between the Shuttle and vehicles like the later ESA IXV, which had two lower body flaps and no other control surfaces.

In the earliest stages of re-entry, the HL-42, like the Shuttle, would rely entirely on the RCS for attitude control. In the Shuttle case, as the surrounding air grew denser and dynamic pressures increased, the ailerons on the outer trailing edges of the wings would grip the airflow first and take over roll control from the RCS. Then, a little later, the elevons on the inner trailing edges would take over pitch control. (The Shuttle's single rear body flap was less important for attitude control, acting only as a pitch trim tab and to shield the main engine nozzles from the heat of re-entry.)

In the case of the HL-42, the elevons on the side fins were too close to the body to meet a steady airflow at this stage, so the two lower body flaps would take over instead, moving together to control pitch and differentially for roll. However, for the Shuttle and for the HL-42, the RCS would control the yaw until much later in the descent since the high angle of attack would still shield the rudder from the airflow. (Note: The body flaps must be carefully designed to avoid producing adverse yaw and interfering with yaw control. Some lower body flaps have a hinge line at right angles to the aircraft's center line. In that case, if the left flap is lowered, it will roll the aircraft right as intended, but the extra drag on the left side will also produce an adverse yaw to the left. However, if the hinge line is skewed so that the inboard end is to the rear of the outboard end (an angle of about 15–25 degrees is usually sufficient), the airflow will also push the flap to the left, producing a yaw to the right that will more or less cancel out the unwanted adverse yaw caused by its drag. Any remaining uncancelled yaw can be dealt with by the RCS (or, below Mach 3.5, by the rudder).)

Finally, for both the Shuttle and the HL-42, as the airspeed dropped below Mach 3.5 with denser air and a lower angle of attack, the rudder would begin to meet the airflow and take over yaw control from the RCS. From here until landing the HL-42 would behave more like a normal aircraft, controlled mainly by elevons and rudder, with some roll control from the lower body flaps. Moving together at lower speeds, the upper body flaps could also assist the elevons in controlling pitch (at higher speeds, they would be out of the airflow and ineffective). After touchdown, the upper body flaps will be extended with the lower body flaps to serve as air brakes.

=== Internal power: electro-mechanical, not hydraulic ===
All seven HL-42 control surfaces were moved by electro-mechanical actuators, not hydraulics as on the Shuttle. The wheels (a conventional Shuttle-type tricycle undercarriage) were also lowered electro-mechanically, not hydraulically as on the Shuttle. This resulted from a deliberate shift in design policy: Langley Research Center had decided not to have any hydraulic systems on the HL-20 but to use electro-mechanical actuators instead, and the HL-42 followed the same principle.

The Shuttle had been designed with three independent hydraulic systems, each pressurised by a turbopump driven by an APU powered by toxic hydrazine. These systems were only powered up during launch, re-entry, and landing and were designed to supply a lot of power for a short time. They could also cope with spikes in demand for up to three times normal power, lasting one or two seconds (for example, when rapidly moving all the control surfaces while lowering the wheels).

However, in the following decades, some spacecraft engineers regarded hydraulic power as unnecessarily complex, unreliable, and hard to maintain. (Note: For example, there were APU malfunctions on three of the first nine Shuttle missions: STS-2 (November 1981): High oil pressures were discovered in two of the three APUs during a launchpad hold. The gear boxes needed to be flushed and filters replaced, forcing the launch to be rescheduled.; STS-3 (March 1982): One APU overheated during ascent and had to be shut down, although it later functioned properly during re-entry and landing.; STS-9 (November–December 1983): Two of the three APUs caught fire during landing.) Even Team 1, in their list of possible Shuttle upgrades, had recommended replacing some or all of the hydraulic systems with electro-mechanical ones. One of their reasons was to simplify ground processing by removing the toxic hydrazine APU fuel, and this fitted in well with the new airline-style operations policy.

However, the HL-42 electrical system would now have to cope with large and unpredictable surges in power demand during landing. (Note: Launch would not be a problem. During launch, the Shuttle used most of its hydraulic power to gimbal its three main engines and operate their large valves. Since under Option 2D, the main engines were now in the expendable launcher, the HL-42 itself needed much less power during launch than the Shuttle.) It was therefore designed with two power sources. Normal baseline power was supplied by hydrogen–oxygen fuel cells as on the orbiting Shuttle; but the HL-42 also had rechargeable silver–zinc batteries to provide reserve power for short periods of very high demand. (This was the same combination of power sources used on the Apollo CSM.)

Team 2 recognised that further development would have to be done on this two-source electrical system, particularly the procedures for switching reserve power in and out. They, therefore, made this the second of the five Advanced Development Tasks Required: "... actuators and their electrical power driving and switching systems must be matured, with emphasis on the power supply systems."

=== Avionics ===
Electronic hardware had advanced tremendously in the two decades since the Shuttle was first planned, and the HL-42 was designed to make maximum use of these advances. It could check itself out on the launch and then fly an entire mission autonomously, navigating by GPS and continuously monitoring its health. "Significant portions of mission operations will be accomplished through automatic systems. Launch, ascent, on-orbit operations, entry, and landing are automated and require no crew intervention, thus reducing cost by eliminating major requirements for facilities and crew training. ... Ground management of on-board systems will be reduced by automation and on-board vehicle health management. Trajectory and navigation management are decreased by using the Global Positioning Satellite system."

Autonomous operation was a major departure from the philosophy of Apollo and the Shuttle, which had been designed as piloted vehicles. Flight control, guidance, and navigation had already been automated in other aircraft, but "on-board vehicle health management" would be more of a challenge; practical spaceflight experience had shown that a major part of the pilot's job was to decide which alarms or combinations of alarms could be safely or temporarily ignored, and which demanded urgent action given the overall situation. (Note: As had long been the case in commercial aviation, most pilot pieces of training was for those situations in which one or more things go wrong unexpectedly.) These decisions would now have to be written into the software. Testing and debugging this software would be a challenging task given that opportunities for actual flight-testing would be extremely limited (to hours or, for launch and re-entry, even minutes per year). (Note: This is why, as Team 3 put it, "Vehicle health management and monitoring, while being successfully and widely utilized on high-performance military and commercial aircraft, is not nearly as mature on domestic space launch systems, except certain subsystems on the Space Shuttle." Flight testing was one area where the Option 3 fully re-usable SSTO would have had a huge advantage; an SSTO spacecraft could undergo many suborbital test flights for the same cost as a single HL-42 launch. Later experience with the F-22 and F-35 showed that software testing and validation will always be a major bottleneck in such cutting-edge development programs, even with dozens of aircraft making weekly test flights.)

Avionics hardware obsolescence would bring other problems. While it might seem logical to upgrade the electronics every five to ten years, all of the software would then have to be re-validated on the new faster hardware, causing operational delays and expense that might well outweigh the benefits of better hardware. (Note: This is one reason why the Shuttle (and later the F-22) were given so few electronic hardware upgrades, and routinely flew with decades-old circuit boards.)

Team 2 was well aware of all this and chose avionics and software as the first of the five Advanced Development Tasks Required: "avionics systems that can be upgraded, software that is automatically generated and validated, and the health management of in-flight functions."

== Development: Business-as-usual versus Skunk Works ==
In the early 1990s a feeling began to develop among some engineers that NASA's culture had become too bureaucratic, with too much paperwork and too many middle managers, and that better results might come from a slimmed-down "Skunk Works" approach. Two of the Study teams shared this feeling: "The Options 2 and 3 teams recommended a streamlined management and contracting approach patterned after the Lockheed "Skunk Works," which features smaller, but dedicated and collocated government oversight, a more efficient contractor internal organization, rapid prototyping, and team continuity from design to flight."

Other NASA teams also shared the feeling. When the DC-X Evaluation Team briefed Dan Goldin on the DC-X project on 1 March 1994, only weeks after the study Summary was published, they recommended the same approach for further DC-X development. The DC-X had been built by McDonnell Douglas, so "rapid management" was by no means confined to Lockheed.

Team 2 in particular hoped for major cost savings from this approach. "The development of the HL-42 ... could use a "Skunk Works" type approach. This approach has been used successfully in major military programs such as the Hercules, U-2, and SR-71. In a study conducted on the HL-20 payload system by the Langley Research Center and Lockheed, it was determined that significant savings could be achieved using this approach. Based on those results, the new approach for the HL-42 ... could yield reductions as high as 40–45 percent in the total spacecraft development and production cost estimates, compared to the traditional "business-as-usual" estimates.

Team 2 characterised "Skunk Works" development as including: "firm requirements, single management authority, small technical staff, customers on site, contractor inspections, limited outside access, timely funding, reports only important work, simple drawing release, rapid prototyping, etc."

== Routine operations ==
In routine operations the HL-42 would be delivered to one of the three OPFs at Kennedy Space Center (KSC) to be prepared and loaded. It would arrive in flight-ready condition; all test and checkout procedures that would duplicate those already performed at the manufacturing facility would be eliminated.

Once loaded with its flight cargo, it would move to the VAB to be rotated to the vertical and mated with the second stage at the top of the heavy launcher. After this it would check itself out using its autonomous systems "with minimum personnel time and in one to two shifts". The whole stack would then be moved to one of the two Launch Complex 39 pads as with the Shuttle. Exactly the same procedure would be used for cargo launches using the ATV.

For Shuttle ground operations the ratio of support staff to those who actually worked on the vehicle (the "nontouch-to-touch" ratio) was six-to-one. For the HL-42, Team 2 hoped to reduce this to three-to-one, a ratio more typical of commercial airlines, thus halving not just salaries but also accommodation costs.

KSC would handle all the launches, handing over to a small (10–12 consoles) mission control room at Johnson Space Center in Houston as soon as the HL-42 had separated from the launcher second stage. "Autonomous systems that had targeted the booster to the separation point would transfer control to the orbital vehicle's autonomous system. This system would calculate the orbital insertion and steer the vehicle to that position. The vehicle would than proceed to the next pre-defined phase of the mission. This sequence would continue until all the mission events had been completed. Ground monitors will have the capability to terminate any phase and re-initialize the autonomous flight system with new instructions."

Since the 'crew' would now be just passengers, training could be greatly simplified and entirely simulation-based. "All training would be conducted in the central simulation facility. Training facilities should mirror flight control facilities for flight monitoring. The training facilities would be used to verify pre-flight analyses. The primary mode of training would be computer based. No motion based, fixed based, or flight aircraft facilities will be required."

All these detailed plans, however, were shelved when the SSTO option was chosen in 1994.

== Legacy ==
=== Situation in 2001–2004: Option 2 partially adopted ===
By 2001 it had become evident that the SSTO Option 3 would be too difficult in practice (at least given the funding that Congress was willing to allocate) and the X-33, X-34 and VentureStar were cancelled in that year. Option 1, substantially upgrading the Shuttle system, had also been abandoned. The Study had shown convincingly that this could not be made cost-effective: "... it is clear that the major cost savings targeted as a goal for this study only accrue in architectures employing new vehicles." It had also proved impracticable to raise Shuttle "crew survivability" above the current 0.98 or 0.99: Option 1 "did not improve significantly on the current crew safety analysis." The existing orbiters would therefore not be substantially upgraded, and by 2004 it had been decided that "With its job done, the Space Shuttle will be phased out when assembly of the ISS is complete, planned for the end of the decade."

In practice, then, it was only Option 2 that was ultimately followed up, though not completely. Delta II was retained. Atlas II was upgraded with a Russian RD-180 engine and flew as the Atlas III in 2000. The expensive Titan IV would be retired in 2005 and replaced by a new heavy launcher introduced in 2004, although this new launcher would be the Delta IV Heavy (26 tonnes to Mir orbit), not the more powerful triple RD-180 version (38 tonnes to Mir orbit) proposed for the Option 2 system. With these upgrades the Atlas and Delta families would continue to launch American uncrewed spacecraft for some time to come; and the ESA ATV (launched on the European Ariane 5) would be ready to take over supplying cargo to the International Space Station three years before the Shuttle was retired.

None of these vehicles, however, would be capable of ferrying crew to and from the ISS.

=== Crewed spaceplanes not reconsidered ===
Even though the problem of assuring post-Shuttle crew access to the ISS was now becoming more urgent, NASA did not revisit the Option 2 combination of a crewed spaceplane with an expendable launcher. The proposed X-38 Space Station 'lifeboat', while looking superficially similar to the HL-20, would have been ferried up as cargo in the Shuttle's payload bay, and used once or not at all; even this was cancelled in 2002. On the other hand, the military Boeing X-37, while operational from 2010, was much smaller (5 tonnes at launch), uncrewed, and never intended to support Space Station operations.

NASA was able to reject all three of the options for post-Shuttle ISS crew access presented in the Study because a fourth option had recently become available: using the Russian Soyuz program infrastructure for all crew transport, a possibility that had not been considered in the Study.

=== The fourth option: Soyuz–Progress ===
In 1993, while the Access to Space Study was being created, several developments occurred in quick succession that would lead to greatly increased Russian cooperation with NASA. (Note: Detailed chronology: In March 1993, President Clinton directed NASA to redesign Space Station Freedom in order to reduce costs, and to consider bringing Russia into the international space station partnership that already included Europe, Japan, and Canada.; On 10 June 1993 the Advisory Committee on the Redesign of the Space Station recommended that NASA pursue opportunities for cooperation with Russia.; On 2 September 1993 the United States and Russia agreed to pursue general cooperation in human space flight; Russia would now be a full partner, not merely an equipment supplier.; On 7 September 1993 the new Space Station design was released, renamed Alpha.; On 1 November 1993 NASA and the Russian Space Agency formally agreed on a plan to bring Russia into the space station program, transforming Space Station Alpha into International Space Station Alpha. ISSA would require $2 billion less funding from NASA while substantially increasing the capabilities of the Station.) As a result, the status of Russian cooperation was still uncertain while the Study was being written between January 1993 and January 1994. The terms of reference allowed the authors to use Russian companies as equipment suppliers (notably for engines); but they were to plan for a 'worst case', and not rely on Roscosmos, the newly established Russian Federal Space Agency, for finance or services. (Note: "[Before 2 September 1993] Russia’s participation had been contemplated during the [Space Station] redesign process, but as a supplier, not a partner.") Crew access was therefore assumed in the Study to be provided only by the US, Europe, Canada and Japan, the original Space Station Freedom consortium as it was in January 1993 when the Study was commissioned. (Note: For the ISS itself the situation was slightly different, with more Soyuz–Progress participation, because the initial ISSA plan was released on 1 November 1993, after Russia had been accepted as a partner. Even then, Russia only agreed "...to launch two Soyuz spacecraft a year to serve as 'lifeboats' and several Progress spacecraft per year to 'reboost' the station periodically to keep it in the correct orbit." Most routine crew transport would still be supplied by NASA.)

Initially Soyuz–Progress was not considered reliable: "From the beginning, challenges arose with Russia’s participation. Many promises were made by high ranking Russian government officials .... Most were not kept. ... Russia’s ability to provide sufficient Soyuz 'lifeboat' spacecraft and Progress 'reboost' spacecraft also was questioned. Funding for Russia’s space program was under severe stress ..."

However, over the next few years American confidence in Soyuz–Progress steadily grew. Russia managed to keep Mir in service and the ambitious Shuttle–Mir Program (1994–98) was a success. By July 2000 the first three ISS modules (two of them, Zarya and Zvezda, built by Russia) were in service, and after Mir was de-orbited on 23 March 2001 all the resources of the Soyuz–Progress system were available to support ISS operations. Relying exclusively on Soyuz–Progress for ISS crew access no longer seemed too risky.

By the time the X-33 SSTO program was cancelled in March 2001, NASA no longer felt under pressure to develop an all-American crew transport vehicle quickly, just to assure access to the ISS after Shuttle retirement; the Russian Soyuz could now provide that, in the short term at least. As for the long term, NASA was working on a new initiative focused on reusable vehicles.

=== The Space Launch Initiative of 2001 ===
In February 2001 the Space Launch Initiative (SLI, also known as the 2nd Generation Reusable Launch Vehicle (RLV) program) was formally established, with the goal of drastically reducing the cost of access to space. This would require ground-breaking new technology, and commercialisation and competition in the launch business. "Today, transferring NASA's space transportation needs to commercial launch vehicles remains the key goal of NASA's space transportation efforts."

The SLI was much less structured than the Access to Space Study with its three clearly defined alternatives. The SLI would start with "Hundreds of concepts"; then "In the program's first two years, a range of risk reduction activities and milestone reviews will gradually narrow viable reusable space transportation systems to two or three candidates." Hopes were high: "With new technologies and operations ... the cost of delivering a payload will drop dramatically from today's price of $10,000 per pound."

It was however clear to everyone that re-usability could only be achieved after several technical breakthroughs; and it would be up to NASA to provide those breakthroughs, at government expense. Nobody had presented this position more clearly than Ivan Bekey, the much-respected former NASA director, in his influential Congressional testimony of 11 April 2000, which helped to decide the fate of the X-33. This attitude might be summarised as 'Cutting-edge, or not at all'. Bekey argued forcefully that since the whole purpose of the X-33 program was to develop and demonstrate new technologies, building it without the ground-breaking but difficult composite hydrogen tanks "makes little sense from a technical point of view."

=== HL-20 and HL-42 revival impossible under SLI ===
These research priorities explain why the HL-20 and HL-42 programs were never revived by NASA. If even the SSTO X-33 (with its aerospike engine and innovative all-metal thermal protection system) was considered not cutting-edge enough without a composite tank, the HL-20 and HL-42 stood even less chance of being built with government money:

- With their expendable launchers they were very far from bringing the desired tenfold reduction in launch costs;
- They had been deliberately designed not to use any breakthrough technology;
- Their job was already being done by Soyuz.

In these circumstances there was no chance that they would be developed further by NASA.

However, commercial space transportation companies would be quite free to develop the HL-20 and HL-42 designs if they wished; NASA now welcomed commercial participation. But companies doing so would risk facing competition from SLI itself. If NASA-funded research really did produce breakthrough technology with $1000 per pound launch costs (a tenfold reduction) then spaceplanes with expendable launchers could never be competitive.

=== SLI discontinued in 2004 ===
By 2004 it had become evident that NASA would never be given sufficient funds for the type of high-risk, high-return program advocated by Bekey: "well-funded parallel component developments", so that if some lines of advance failed, as they inevitably would, still one of them might succeed and bring immense rewards – perhaps even reducing costs to as little as $100 per pound. Not only was Congress reluctant to provide the funding, but the management of such programs had also proved to be unexpectedly challenging, as the X-33 and X-34 had demonstrated.

NASA accordingly abandoned this line of development in March 2004. "NASA does not plan to pursue new Earth-to-orbit transportation capabilities, except where necessary to support unique exploration needs, such as those that could be met by a heavy lift vehicle. The budget discontinues the Space Launch Initiative ..."

NASA's own new vehicle programs would now concentrate only on exploration beyond LEO: the Constellation program, and ultimately the heavy-lift Space Launch System and Orion (which would be designed primarily for travel beyond LEO, though if necessary it could also be used in a Soyuz role to support the ISS).

=== Post-2004 revival of spaceplanes: Dream Chaser ===
Now that there was no prospect of a dramatic NASA-funded breakthrough cutting launch costs by one, perhaps two, orders of magnitude, the way was open for commercial ventures to develop the more conventional ideas that NASA had dismissed for a decade as 'not cutting-edge enough', among them the HL-20 and HL-42. An idea that halved costs stood a good chance of being successful and even profitable.

In 2006 Jim Benson (who had founded SpaceDev in 1997) licensed the HL-20 design for use in the Dream Chaser project. Unlike the HL-42, the Dream Chaser was not required to ferry three or four tonnes of cargo back down to Earth, so could return to the smaller size of the HL-20. This was light enough to be put on top of an Atlas-class launcher, and in 2007 an agreement was reached with United Launch Alliance to use the Atlas V as the first Dream Chaser launcher.

This is the combination that finally, in January 2016, won a six-launch Commercial Resupply Services contract with NASA.

== See also ==
- ASSET
- Boeing X-20 Dyna-Soar
- BOR-4
- Kliper
- Martin Marietta X-24A
- Martin X-23 PRIME
- Mikoyan-Gurevich MiG-105
- Prometheus
- Shenlong spaceplane
