= Takeoff and landing =

Method used by an aircraft to depart and return to the ground

Aircraft have different ways to take off and land. Conventional airplanes accelerate along the ground until reaching a speed that is sufficient for the airplane to take off and climb at a safe speed. Some airplanes can take off at low speed, this being a short takeoff. Some aircraft such as helicopters and Harrier jump jets can take off and land vertically. Rockets also usually take off vertically, but some designs can land horizontally.

== Principles ==
=== Takeoff ===
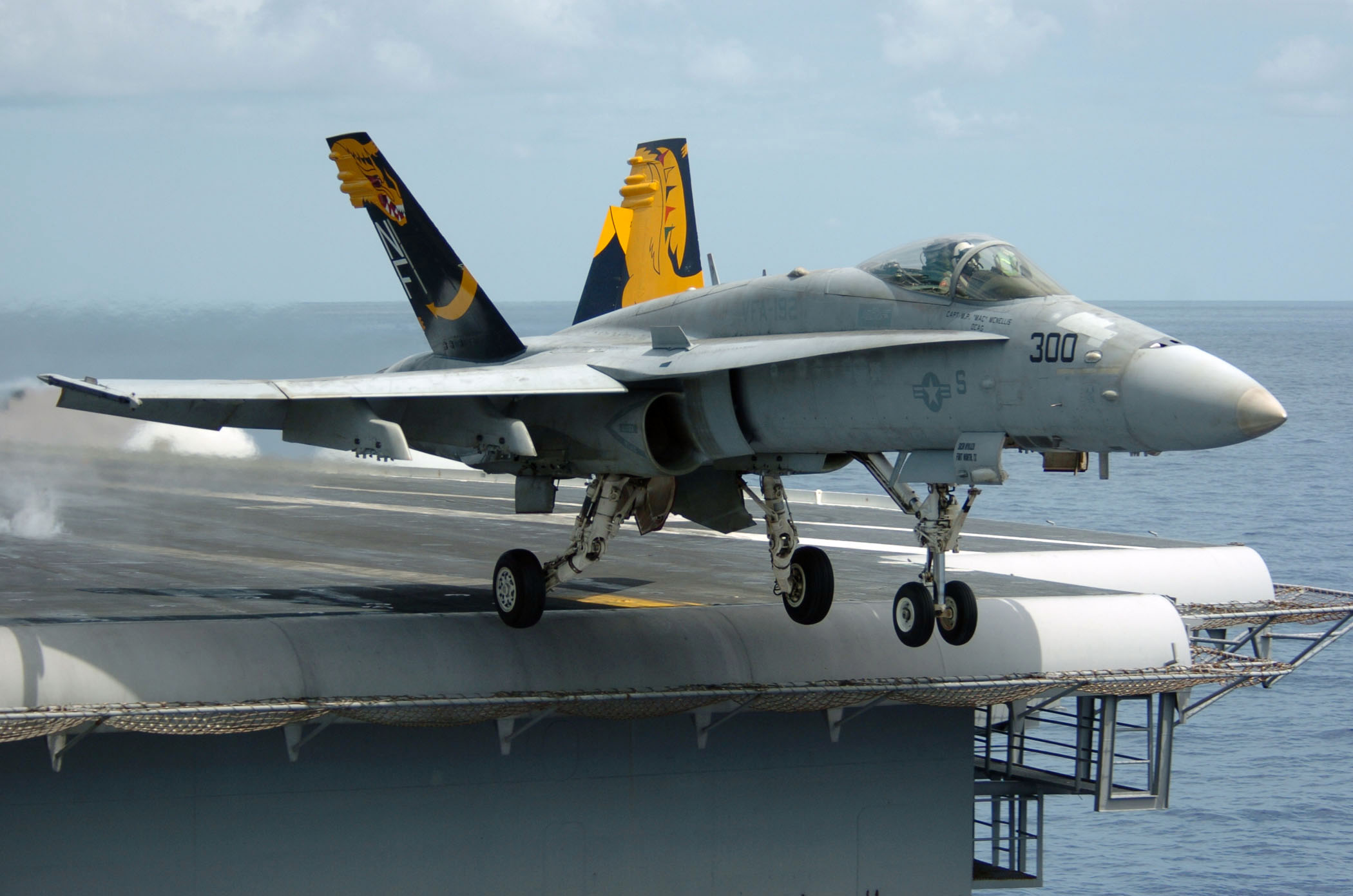
An F/A-18 taking off from an aircraft carrier

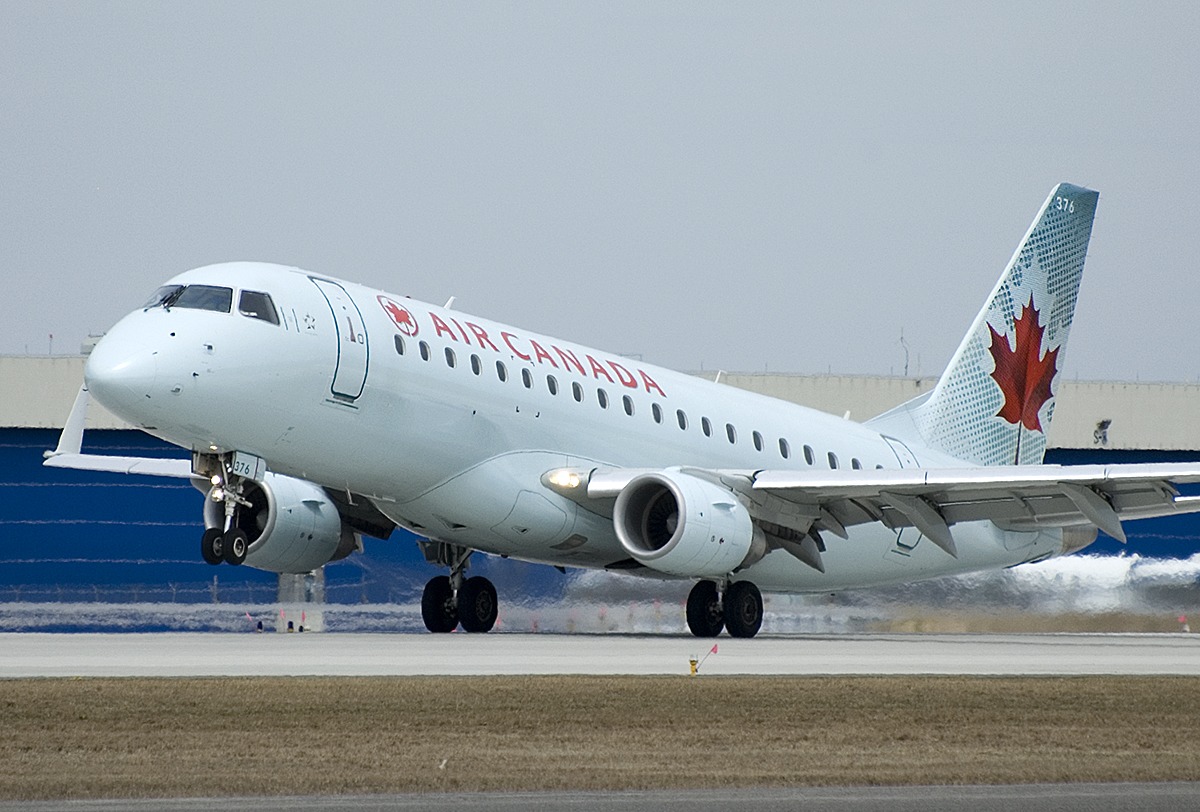
An Embraer E175 taking off

Takeoff or take-off is the phase of flight during which an aerial vehicle leaves the ground and becomes airborne. For space vehicles that launch vertically, this is known as liftoff.

For fixed-wing aircraft that take off horizontally (conventional takeoff), this usually involves an accelerating ground run (known as the roll) on a runway to build up speed so the wings can generate enough lift. For aerostats (balloons and airships), helicopters, tiltrotors (e.g. the V-22 Osprey) and thrust-vectoring STOVL fixed-wing aircraft (e.g. the Harrier jump jet and F-35B), a helipad/STOLport is sufficient and no runway is needed.

Takeoff of the Shuttle Carrier Aircraft carrying the Space Shuttle Enterprise

=== Landing ===
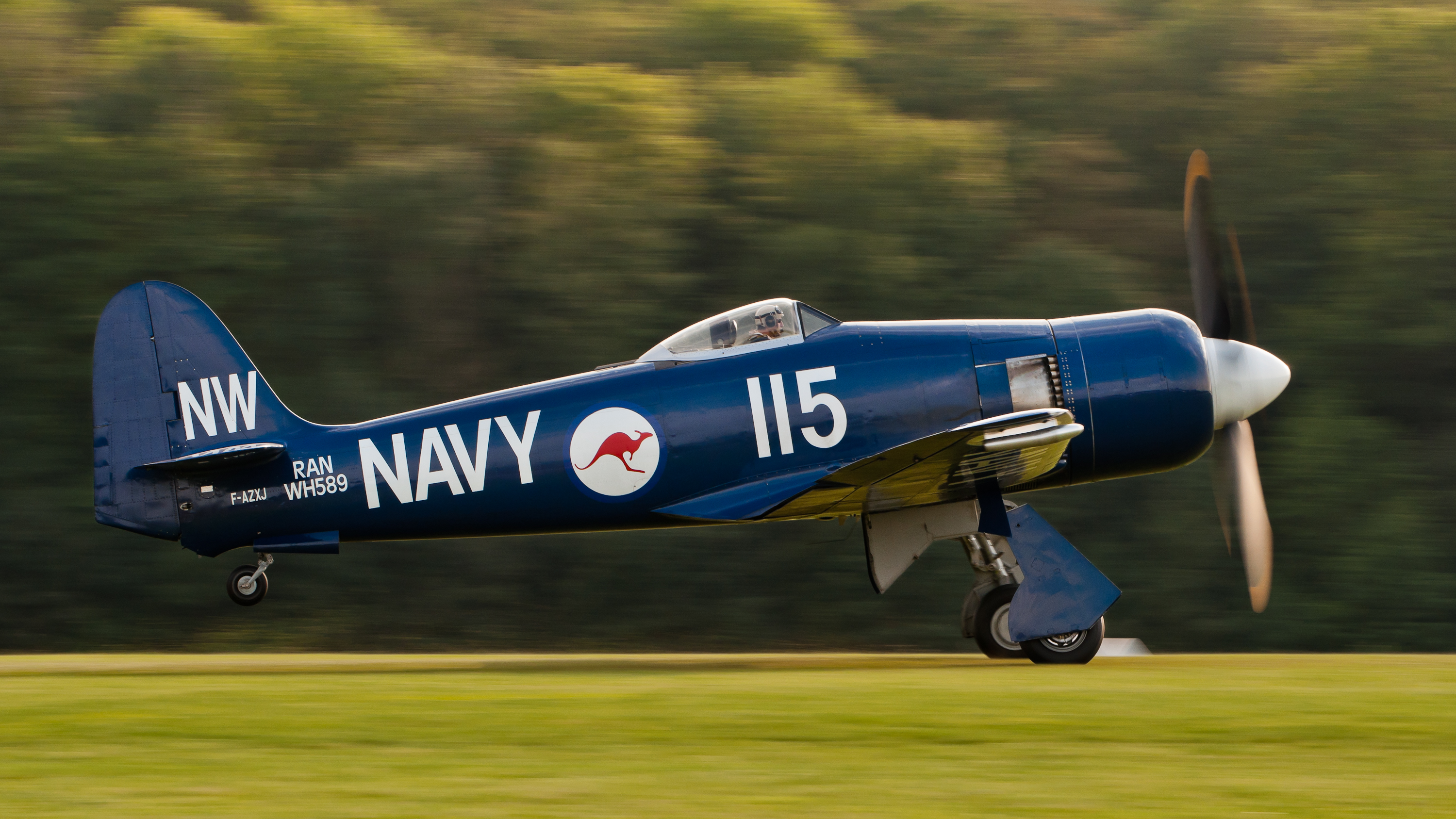
Landing of Hawker Sea Fury FB 10

Landing is the last part of a flight, where a flying animal, aircraft, or spacecraft returns to the ground. When the flying object returns to water, the process is called alighting, although it is commonly called "landing", "touchdown"^{a} or "splashdown" as well. A normal aircraft flight would include several parts of flight including taxi, takeoff, climb, cruise, descent and landing.

An aircraft landing at Haneda Airport in Japan, 2021

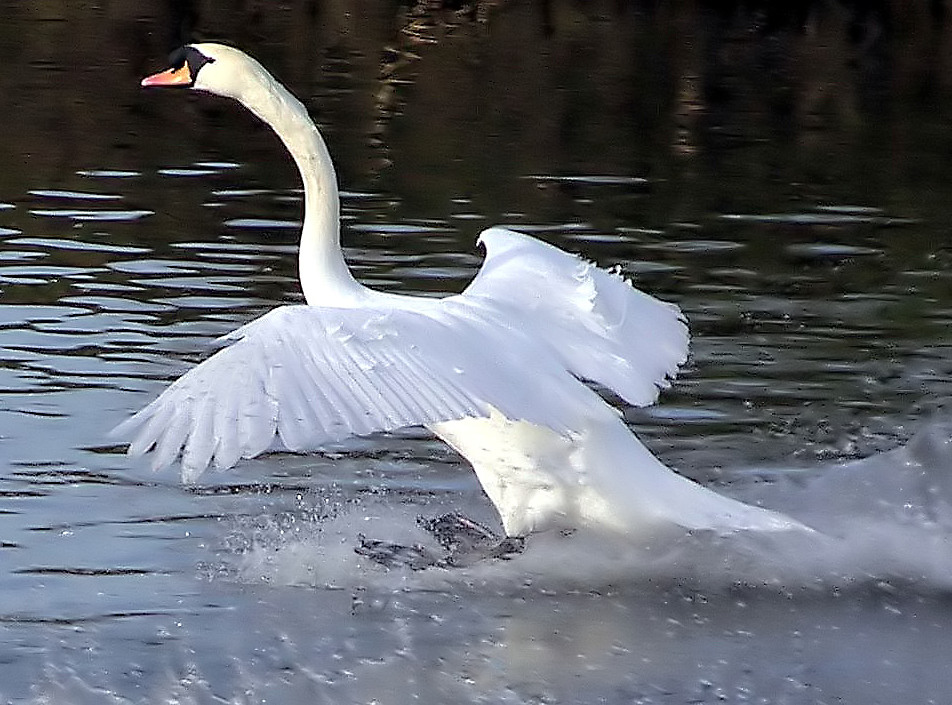
A mute swan alighting. Note the ruffled feathers on top of the wings indicate that the swan is flying at the stalling speed. The extended and splayed feathers act as lift augmenters in the same way as an aircraft's slats and flaps.

== Horizontal takeoff and landing ==
=== Aircraft ===
==== Conventional takeoff and landing (CTOL) ====
CTOL is the process whereby conventional fixed-wing aircraft (such as passenger aircraft) take off and land, involving the use of runways.

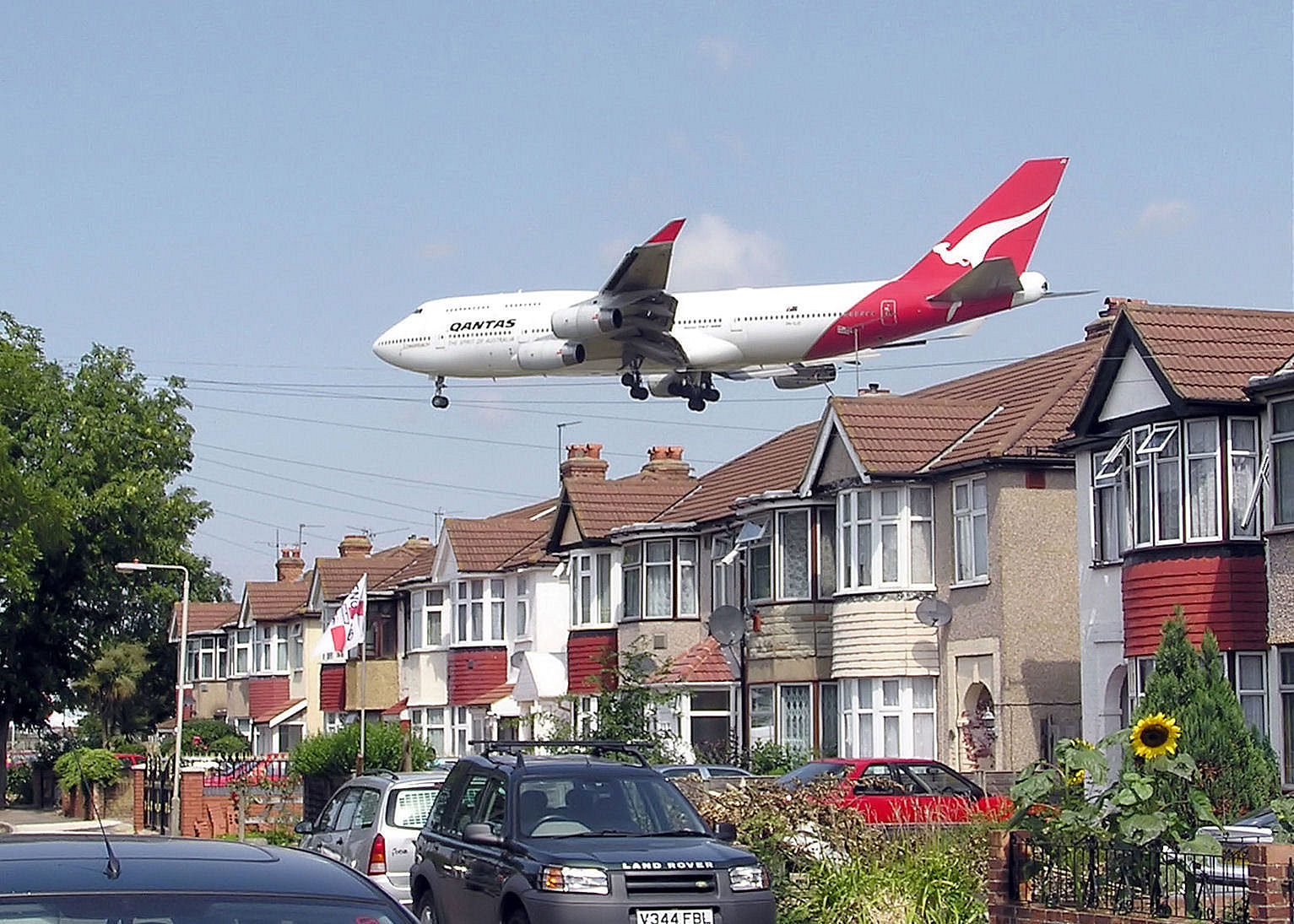
A landing Qantas Boeing 747-400 passes close to houses on the boundary of London Heathrow Airport, England.

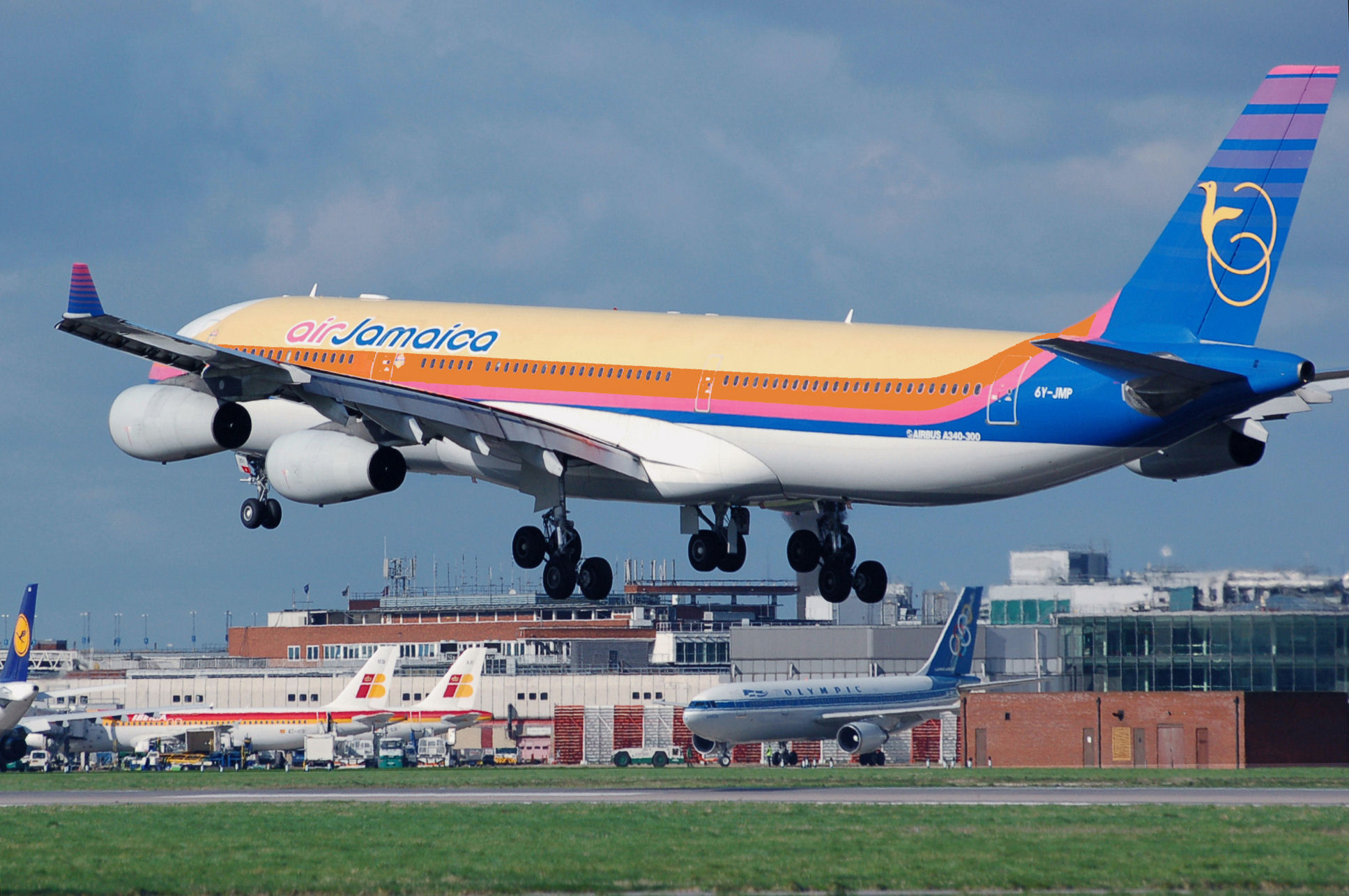
An airliner flaring at London Heathrow Airport (Air Jamaica Airbus A340-300)

==== Reduced takeoff and landing (RTOL) ====
RTOL aircraft require shorter runways than conventional types, typically 3,500 feet (1,100 m) to 4,500 feet (1,400 m).

==== Short takeoff and landing (STOL) ====
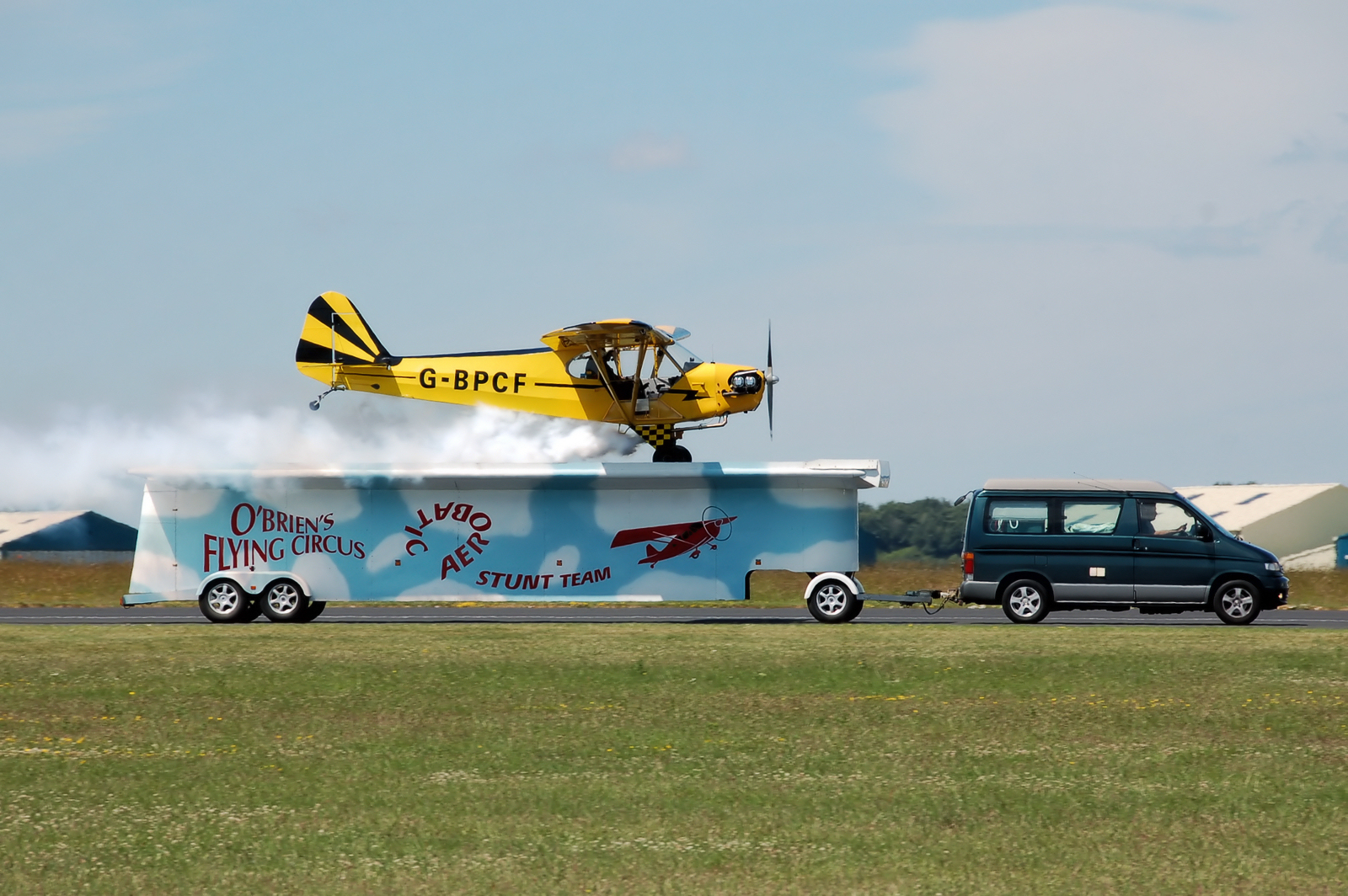
An unusual landing; a Piper J3C-65 Cub lands on a trailer as part of an airshow.

STOL is an acronym for short take-off and landing, aircraft with very short runway requirements, typically between 2,000 feet (610 m) to 3,500 feet (1,100 m).

==== Catapult launch and arrested recovery (CATOBAR) ====
CATOBAR (catapult assisted takeoff but arrested recovery) is a system used for the launch and recovery of aircraft from the deck of an aircraft carrier. Under this technique, aircraft are launched using a catapult and land on the ship (the recovery phase) using arrestor wires.

Although this system is more costly than alternative methods, it provides greater flexibility in carrier operations, since it allows the vessel to support conventional aircraft. Alternate methods of launch and recovery can only use aircraft with STOVL or STOBAR capability.

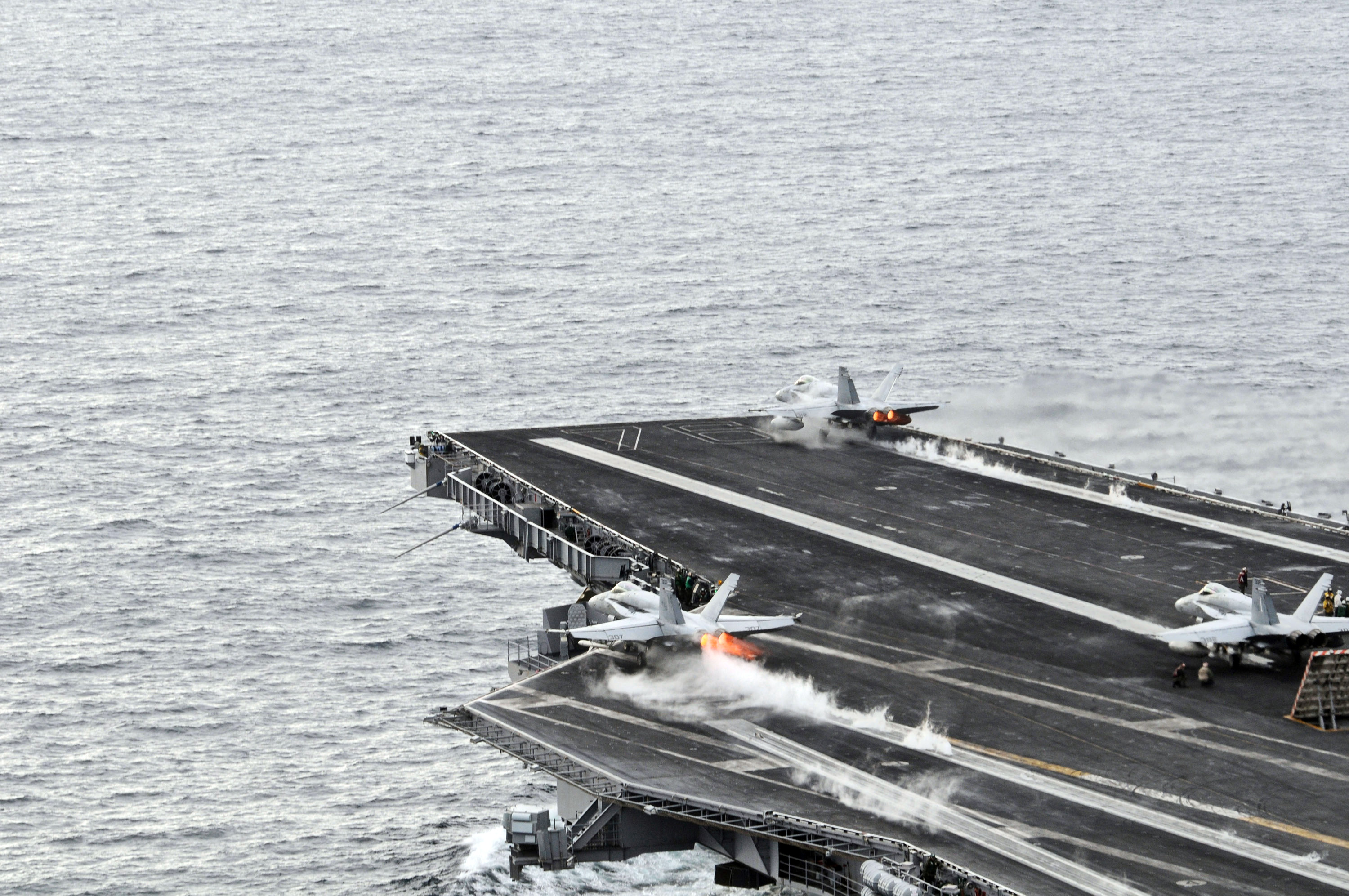
Catapult launches aboard USS Ronald Reagan

F-18 landing on an aircraft carrier

==== Short Take Off But Arrested Recovery (STOBAR) ====
STOBAR (Short Take Off But Arrested Recovery) is a system used for the launch and recovery of aircraft from the deck of an aircraft carrier, combining elements of both STOVL (Short Take-Off and Vertical Landing) and CATOBAR (Catapult Assisted Take-Off But Arrested Recovery).

=== Spacecraft (HTHL) ===
Horizontal takeoff, horizontal landing (HTHL) — is the mode of operation for the first private commercial spaceplane, the two-stage-to-space Scaled Composites Tier One from the Ansari X-Prize SpaceShipOne/WhiteKnightOne combination. It is also used for the upcoming Tier 1b SpaceShipTwo/WhiteKnightTwo combination. A prominent example of its use was the North American X-15 program. In these examples the space craft are carried to altitude on a "mother ship" before launch. The failed proposals for NASA Space Shuttle replacements, Rockwell X-30 NASP used this mode of operation but were conceived as single stage to orbit.

The Lynx rocketplane was a suborbital HTHL spaceplane developed by XCOR Aerospace that was slated to begin atmospheric flight testing in late 2011. However, after numerous delays, XCOR Aerospace went bankrupt in 2017 without finishing a prototype.

Reaction Engines Skylon, a design descendant of the 1980s British HOTOL ("Horizontal Take-Off and Landing") design project, was a proposed HTHL spaceplane developed in the United Kingdom.

Both the Lynx rocketplane and SpaceShipTwo have been proffered to NASA to carry suborbital research payloads in response to NASA's suborbital reusable launch vehicle (sRLV) solicitation under the NASA Flight Operations Program.

An early example was the 1960s Northrop HL-10 atmospheric test aircraft where the HL stands for "Horizontal Lander".

== Vertical takeoff and landing ==
Different terms are used for takeoff and landing depending on the source of thrust used. VTVL uses rockets, whereas VTOL uses air, propelled via some kind of rotor system.

=== Aircraft (VTOL) ===
Vertical Take-Off and Landing (VTOL) aircraft includes fixed-wing aircraft that can hover, take off and land vertically as well as helicopters and other aircraft with powered rotors, such as tiltrotors. The terminology for spacecraft and rockets is VTVL (vertical takeoff with vertical landing). Some VTOL aircraft can operate in other modes as well, such as CTOL (conventional take-off and landing), STOL (short take-off and landing), and/or STOVL (short take-off and vertical landing). Others, such as some helicopters, can only operate by VTOL, due to the aircraft lacking landing gear that can handle horizontal motion. VTOL is a subset of V/STOL (vertical and/or short take-off and landing).

Besides the ubiquitous helicopter, there are currently two types of VTOL aircraft in military service: craft using a tiltrotor, such as the Bell Boeing V-22 Osprey, and aircraft using directed jet thrust such as the Harrier family. In the civilian sector currently only helicopters are in general use (some other types of commercial VTOL aircraft have been proposed and are under development as of 2017).

=== Rocket (VTVL) ===
Vertical takeoff, vertical landing (VTVL) is a form of takeoff and landing for rockets. Multiple VTVL craft have flown. The most widely known and commercially successful VTVL rocket is SpaceX's Falcon 9 first stage.

VTVL technologies were developed substantially with small rockets after 2000, in part due to incentive prize competitions like the Lunar Lander Challenge. Successful small VTVL rockets were developed by Masten Space Systems, Armadillo Aerospace, and others.

== Vertical takeoff and horizontal landing ==
=== Aircraft (VTOHL) ===
In aviation the term VTOHL ("Vertical Take-Off and Horizontal Landing") as well as several VTOHL aviation-specific subtypes: VTOCL, VTOSL, VTOBAR exist.

==== Zero-length launch system ====
The zero-length launch system or zero-length take-off system (ZLL, ZLTO, ZEL, ZELL) was a system whereby jet fighters and attack aircraft were intended to be placed upon rockets attached to mobile launch platforms. Most zero-length launch experiments took place in the 1950s, during the Cold War.

=== Spacecraft (VTHL) ===
Vertical takeoff, horizontal landing (VTHL) is the mode of operation for all current and formerly operational orbital spaceplanes, such as the Boeing X-37, the NASA Space Shuttle, the 1988 Soviet Buran space shuttle, and the PRC Reusable experimental spacecraft/Shenlong. For launch vehicles an advantage of VTHL over HTHL is that the wing can be smaller, since it only has to carry the landing weight of the vehicle, rather than the takeoff weight.

There have been several VTHL proposals that never flew, including the circa-1960 USAF Boeing X-20 Dyna-Soar project, NASA Space Shuttle proposed replacements, Lockheed Martin X-33, and VentureStar. The 1990s NASA concept spaceplane, the HL-20 Personnel Launch System (HL stands for "Horizontal Lander"), was VTHL, as was a circa-2003 derivative of the HL-20, the Orbital Space Plane concept.

As of March 2011, two VTHL commercial spaceplanes were in various stages of proposal/development, both successors to the HL-20 design. The Sierra Nevada Corporation Dream Chaser follows the outer mold line of the earlier HL-20. The circa-2011 proposed Orbital Sciences Corporation Prometheus was a blended lifting body spaceplane that followed the outer mold line of the circa-2003 Orbital Space Plane, itself a derivative of the HL-20; however, Prometheus did not receive any NASA contracts and Orbital has announced they will not pursue further development.

German Aerospace Center studied reusable VTHL Liquid Fly-back Boosters from 1999. Design was intended to replace Ariane 5 solid rocket boosters. The U.S. government-funded, US$250,000,000, Reusable Booster System program, initiated by the USAF in 2010, had specified a high-level requirement that the design be VTHL, but the funding was discontinued after 2012.

In 2017 DARPA selected a VTHL design for XS-1.

== Horizontal takeoff and vertical landing ==
Few airplanes can operate with conventional takeoff and vertical landing (and its subtypes STOVL, CATOVL) as the F-35B.

Horizontal takeoff and vertical landing (HTVL) in spaceflight has not been used, but has been proposed for some systems that use a two-stage to orbit launch system with a plane based first stage, and a capsule return vehicle. One of the few HTVL concept vehicles is the 1960s concept spacecraft Hyperion SSTO, designed by Philip Bono.

== Multi-mode configurations ==
Vehicles use more than one mode also exist.

=== Vertical/Short takeoff landing (V/STOL) ===
Vertical and/or short take-off and landing (V/STOL) aircraft that are able to take off or land vertically or on short runways. Vertical takeoff and landing (VTOL) includes craft that do not require runways at all. Generally, a V/STOL aircraft needs to be able to hover; helicopters are not typically considered under the V/STOL classification.

A rolling takeoff, sometimes with a ramp (ski-jump), reduces the amount of thrust required to lift an aircraft from the ground (compared with vertical takeoff), and hence increases the payload and range that can be achieved for a given thrust. For instance, the Harrier is incapable of taking off vertically with a full weapons and fuel load. Hence V/STOL aircraft generally use a runway if it is available. I.e. Short Take-Off and Vertical Landing (STOVL) or Conventional Take-off and Landing (CTOL) operation is preferred to VTOL operation.

V/STOL was developed to allow fast jets to be operated from clearings in forests, from very short runways, and from small aircraft carriers that would previously only have been able to carry helicopters.

The main advantage of V/STOL aircraft is closer basing to the enemy, which reduces response time and tanker support requirements. In the case of the Falklands War, it also permitted high performance fighter air cover and ground attack without a large aircraft carrier equipped with a catapult.

The latest V/STOL aircraft is the F-35B, which entered service in 2015.

== See also ==
- Landing gear
