= BOR-4 =

Soviet spaceplane (1980-1984)

BOR-4S
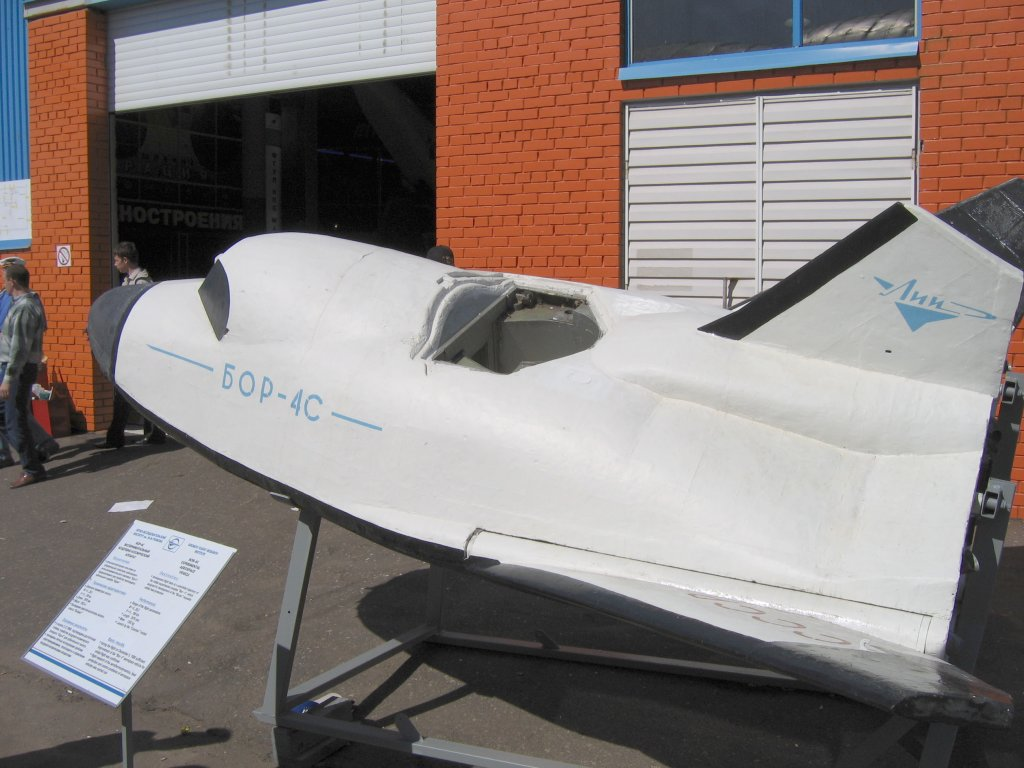
- BOR-4S nº401 at MAKS Airshow in Zhukovskiy, 2005

General information
- Type: Uncrewed 1:2 scale re-entry test vehicle
- National origin: Soviet Union
- Manufacturer: NPO Molniya
- Number built: 7

History
- First flight: 5 December 1980

The BOR-4 (БОР-4 Russian: Беспилотный Орбитальный Ракетоплан 4, Bespilotnyi Orbital'nyi Raketoplan 4, "Unpiloted Orbital Rocketplane 4") flight vehicle is a scaled (1:2) prototype of the Soviet Spiral VTHL (vertical takeoff, horizontal landing) spaceplane. An uncrewed, subscale spacecraft, its purpose was to test the heatshield tiles and reinforced carbon-carbon for the Buran space shuttle, then under development.

Several of them were built and flown between 1982 and 1984 from the Kapustin Yar launch site at speeds of up to Mach 25, using K65-RB5 variant of Kosmos-3M launch vehicle. After reentry, they were designed to parachute to an ocean splashdown for recovery by the Soviet Navy. The testing was nearly identical to that carried out by the US Air Force ASSET program in the 1960s, which tested the heatshield design for the X-20 Dyna-Soar. On 16 March 1983 a Royal Australian Air Force P-3 Orion reconnaissance aircraft captured the first Western images of the craft as it was recovered by a Soviet ship near the Cocos Islands.

== Flights ==
Seven BOR were built, and four confirmed flights took place between 1982 and 1984. All orbital flights were launched using Kosmos-3M rockets at the Kapustin Yar launch complex in Astrakhan Oblast, Russia

BOR-4 test flights
Mission	Launch date (UTC)	Landing date (UTC)	Recovery site	Orbit	Duration (in orbit)	Outcome
Kosmos 1374	3 June 1982; 21:36	3 June 1982; 23:04	17°S 98°E; Indian Ocean	158 x 204 km	1 hour, 28 minutes	Success
Kosmos 1445	15 March 1983; 22:33	16 March 1983; 00:25	Indian Ocean	158 x 208 km	1 hour, 52 minutes	Success
Kosmos 1517	27 December 1983; 10:04	27 December 1983; 11:46	Black Sea	212 x 217 km	1 hour, 42 minutes	Success
Kosmos 1614	19 December 1984; 04:04	19 December 1984; 05:26	Black Sea	174 x 223 km	1 hour, 22 minutes	Partial failure. Spacecraft lost at sea during recovery

== Current locations ==
- BOR-4S nº401 – Zhukovsky, Moscow Oblast, Russia
- BOR-4 – Zhukovsky, Moscow Oblast, Russia

== See also ==
- HL-20 Personnel Launch System
- Dream Chaser
