= HL-20 Personnel Launch System =

NASA cancelled spaceplane project

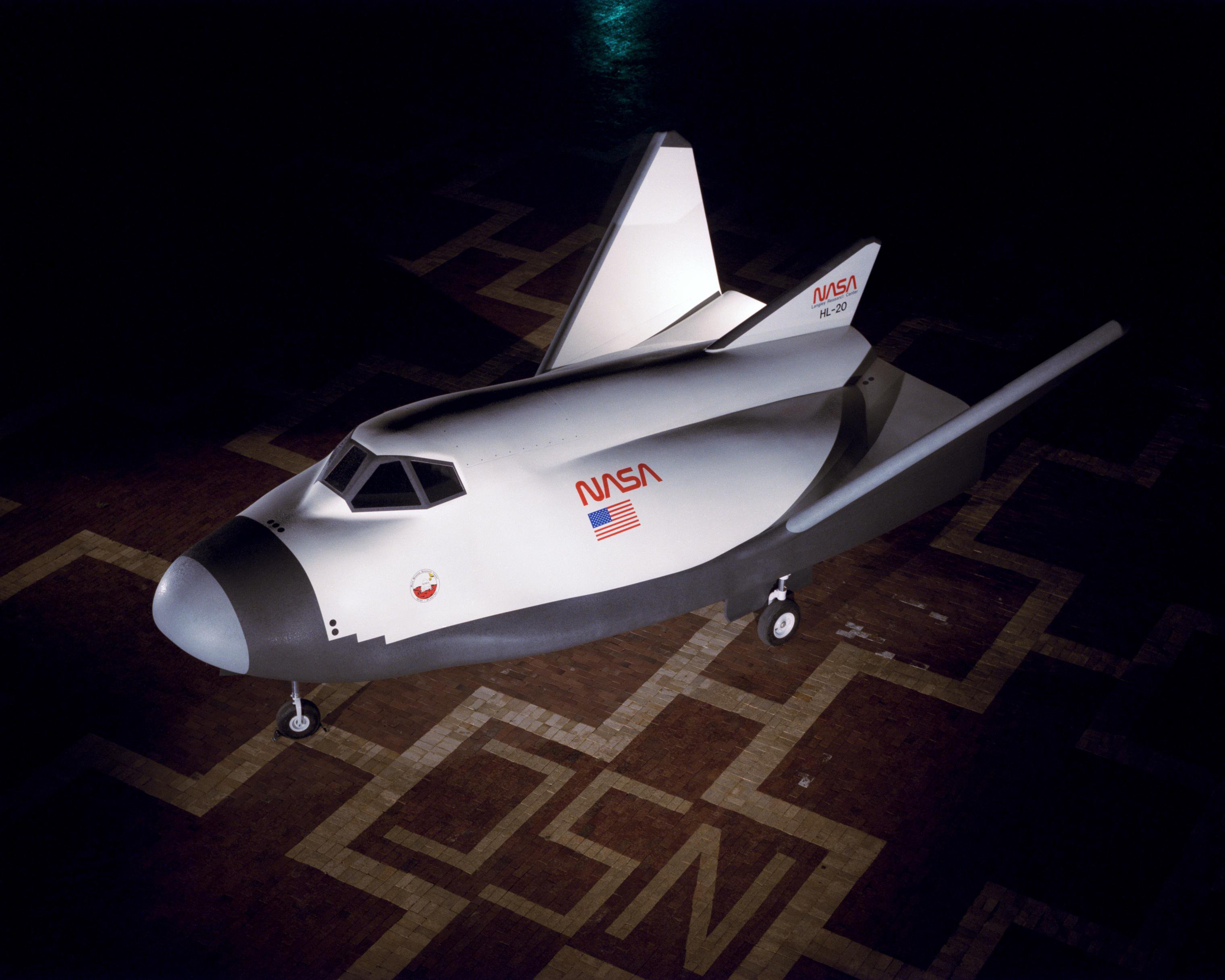
- HL-20 Mock-Up
- Operator: NASA
- Applications: Crewed spaceplane

Specifications
- Launch mass: 10,884 kg (23,995 lb)
- Regime: Low Earth

Production
- Status: Cancelled
- Launched: 0

Related spacecraft
- Derivatives: HL-42, Dream Chaser

The HL-20 Personnel Launch System was a NASA spaceplane concept for crewed orbital missions studied by NASA's Langley Research Center around 1990. It was envisaged as a lifting body re-entry vehicle similar to the Soviet BOR-4 spaceplane design. Its stated goals were to achieve low operational costs, improved flight safety, and a possibility of landing on conventional runways. No flight hardware was built.

== PLS concept ==
With increasing national interest in obtaining routine access to space, a number of Earth-to-orbit transportation systems were studied in the mid-1980s. One, referred to as a Personnel Launch System (PLS), could utilize the HL-20 and an expendable launch system to provide crewed access complementing the Space Shuttle. A full-size engineering research model of the HL-20 was constructed in 1990 by the students and faculty of North Carolina State University and North Carolina A&T University for studying crew seating arrangements, habitability, equipment layout and crew ingress and egress. This 29-foot (9 m) long engineering research model was used at Langley to define the full-scale external and internal definition of the HL-20 for utilization studies.

The PLS mission was to transport people and small amounts of cargo to and from low Earth orbit, i.e., a small space taxi system. Although never approved for development, the PLS concept spaceplane was designed as a complement to the Space Shuttle and was being considered an addition to the crewed launch capability of the United States for three main reasons:

- Assured crewed access to space. In the era of Space Station Freedom and subsequent missions of the Space Exploration Initiative, it is imperative that the United States have an alternate means of getting people and valuable small cargo to low Earth orbit and back, should the Space Shuttle be unavailable.
- Enhanced crew safety. Unlike the Space Shuttle, the PLS would not have main propulsion engines or large payload bay. By removing large payload-carrying requirements from personnel-delivery missions, the PLS would be a small, compact vehicle. It is then more feasible to design an abort capability to safely recover the crew during critical phases of the launch and return from orbit.
- Affordable costs. As a small vehicle designed with available technologies, the PLS is forecast to have a low development cost. Subsystem simplification and an aircraft approach to PLS ground and flight operations can also greatly lower the costs of operating PLS.

Two designs that were considered for PLS differed in their aerodynamic characteristics and mission capabilities:

- the Johnson Space Center's approach used a blunt cone shape (similar to the various Moon-mission return vehicles), incorporating a parachute system for coming to rest;
- the Langley Research Center proposed a lifting body that could make a conventional runway landing on return from orbit.

== Lifting-body development ==
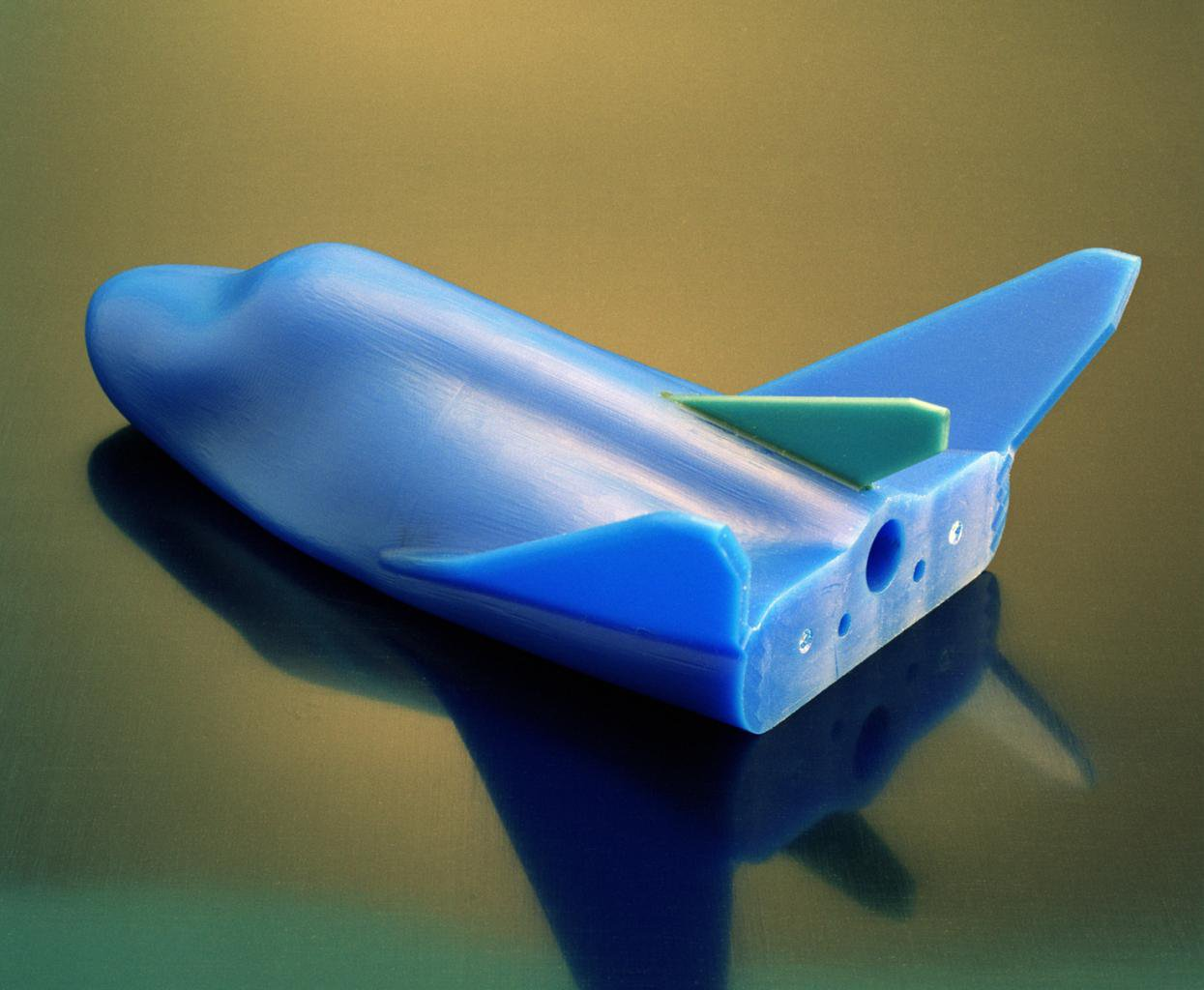
Wax model of the HL-20, used for Wind Tunnel Testing.

Predating and influencing the design of the Space Shuttle, several lifting-body craft, including M2-F2, M2-F3, HL-10, and the X-24 A and X-24B, were flown by test pilots from 1966 through 1975. The M2-F2 and the HL-10 were proposed in the 1960s to carry 12 people to a space station following launch on a Saturn IB. The HL-20 PLS concept was evolved from these early shapes, being further influenced by the Soviet MiG-105 and especially BOR-4. The "HL" designation stands for horizontal lander, and "20" reflects Langley's long-term involvement with the lifting-body concept, which included the Northrop HL-10.

A lifting-body spacecraft would have several advantages over other shapes. With higher lift characteristics during flight through the atmosphere while returning from orbit, the spacecraft can reach more land area, and the number of available landing opportunities to specific sites would be increased. Deceleration loading during entry would be limited to about 1.5 G. This is important when returning sick, injured, or deconditioned Space Station crew members to Earth. Wheeled runway landings would be possible, permitting simple, precision recovery at many sites around the world, including the Kennedy Space Center launch site.

== Proposed missions ==
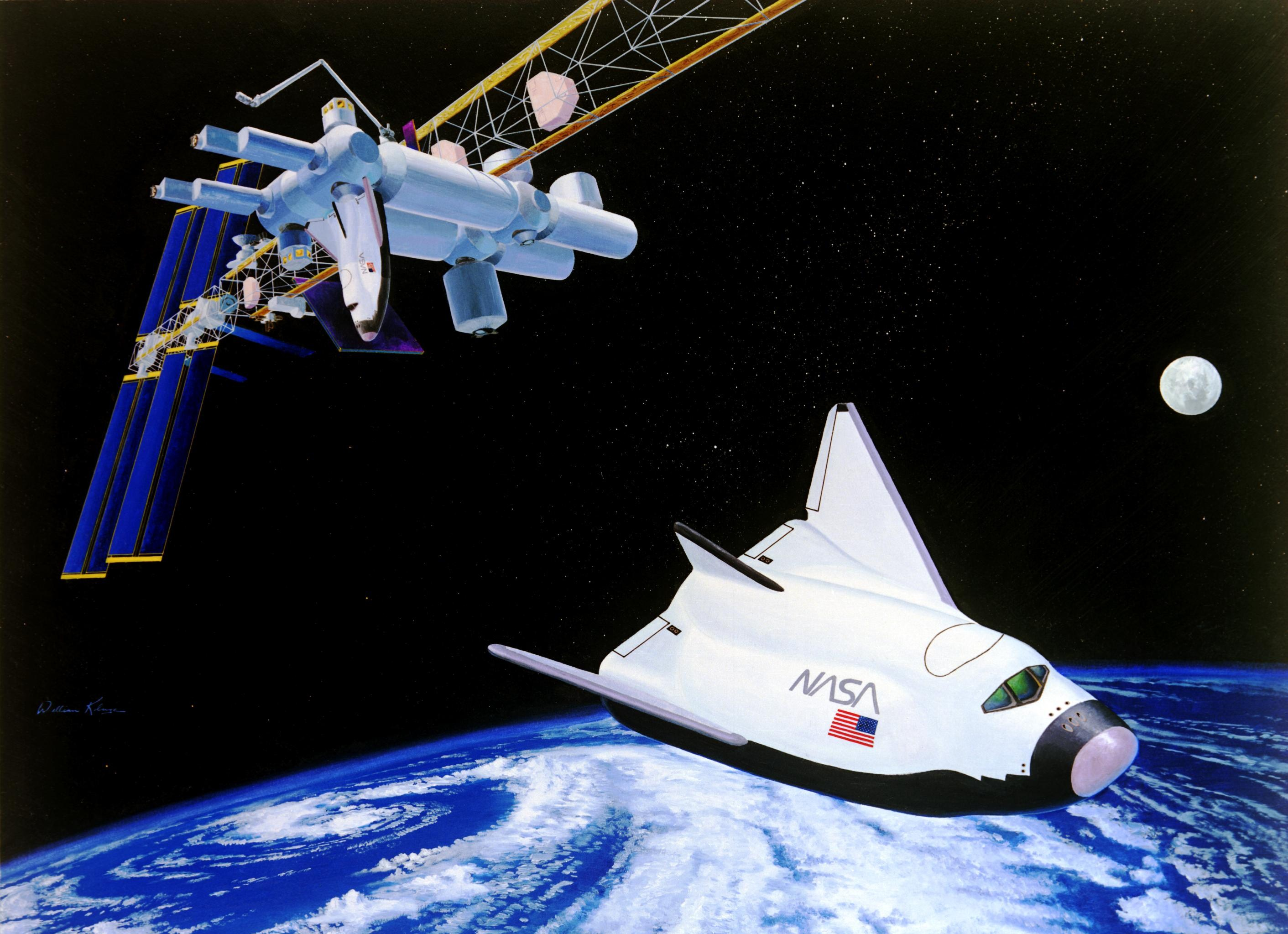
HL-20 depicted as leaving the planned Space Station Freedom

Originally, delivery of passengers to Space Station Freedom would have been the primary mission of a PLS. For the baseline space station mission, depending on design, the crew size would be either 8 or 10 crew members.

A typical HL-20 mission operation would commence at the Kennedy Space Center with the HL-20 being processed horizontally in a vehicle-processing facility, while an expendable launch vehicle is processed vertically in a separate facility. The launch vehicle and HL-20 would be mated at the launch pad, and the launch sequence initiated as the space station passes over the launch site.

Following launch, the HL-20 would initially enter a low 100-nautical-mile (200 km) orbit to chase after the space station and then transfer up to the space-station orbit altitude of 220 nautical miles (410 km). After rendezvous and docking at Space Station Freedom, crews would be exchanged, and the HL-20 would decelerate for return to Earth.

The HL-20 would land horizontally on a runway similar to the return of the Space Shuttle. Total mission duration could be as low as 72 hours.

Other potential missions defined for a PLS included the orbital rescue of stranded astronauts, priority delivery and observation missions, and missions to perform satellite servicing. For these other missions, the basic HL-20 design would be unchanged, but interior subsystems and arrangements would be modified according to crew accommodations, duration, and equipment required for the particular mission.

== Design features ==
3 view diagram of the spacecraft

The HL-20 concept of the PLS is adaptable to several launch vehicle concepts. Titan IV was an existing booster system which could have been used for uncrewed prototype launches or, with modification, as a crewed system. A future launch system option would have been the National Launch System under study by the Air Force and NASA in the 1990s. Choice of a launch system for the HL-20 PLS would depend both on the required date of initial PLS operations and the cost of booster development and launches.

The HL-20 PLS concept was to complement the Space Shuttle with safe, reliable crewed transportation at the lowest cost. Crew safety was of utmost importance with the HL-20 design emphasizing crew protection during aborted launches and vehicle recovery. Other requirements had focused on minimizing life-cycle costs of the system by ensuring simple operations, low-cost manufacturing, and high utilization potential. When not including the time of the mission, turnaround time was expected to be 43 days.

With an overall length of about 29 feet (8.8 m) and wingspan of 23.5 feet (7.2 m), the HL-20 would be a much smaller craft than the Space Shuttle Orbiter; it could fit within the payload bay of the Shuttle with wings folded. Projected empty weight of the HL-20 was 23,000 pounds (10 t) compared to the Space Shuttle Orbiter's empty weight of 185,000 pounds (84 t). Its cockpit, although smaller than that of the Shuttle, would exceed that of today's small corporate business jets.

A focus on easy maintenance would reduce the operating costs of the HL-20 PLS. The vehicle would be prepared in a horizontal position, and its large exterior access panels permit easy access to subsystems, allowing easy servicing or replacement. The selection and design of these subsystems would emphasize simplicity and reduce maintenance requirements: for example, hydraulic systems would be replaced by all-electric controls. Moreover, unlike the Space Shuttle, the HL-20 would not have a payload bay or main engine propulsion, and its thermal protection system, while similar to the Space Shuttle's combination of tiles and ablative coatings, would be far quicker to inspect and maintain due to the HL-20's much smaller size. These design changes and subsystem simplifications, along with the adoption of aircraft maintenance philosophies, could reduce the HL-20 preparation man-hours to less than 10 percent of the Space Shuttle Orbiter's requirement.

To protect the crew during an aborted launch, the HL-20 PLS incorporates several safety features. Its interior layout with a ladder and hatch arrangement was designed to permit rapid egress of passengers and crew for emergencies on the launch pad. For emergencies during which the crew must leave at once (launch vehicle fire or explosion), the HL-20, in a manner much similar to Apollo program rockets, would be equipped with emergency escape rockets to push the PLS away from the booster. Once at a safe distance, three emergency parachutes would open to slow the vehicle's descent into the ocean. Upon splashdown, inflatable flotation devices would ensure that at least one of the PLS's two hatches is above the water and available for emergency crew egress.

== Contracted efforts ==
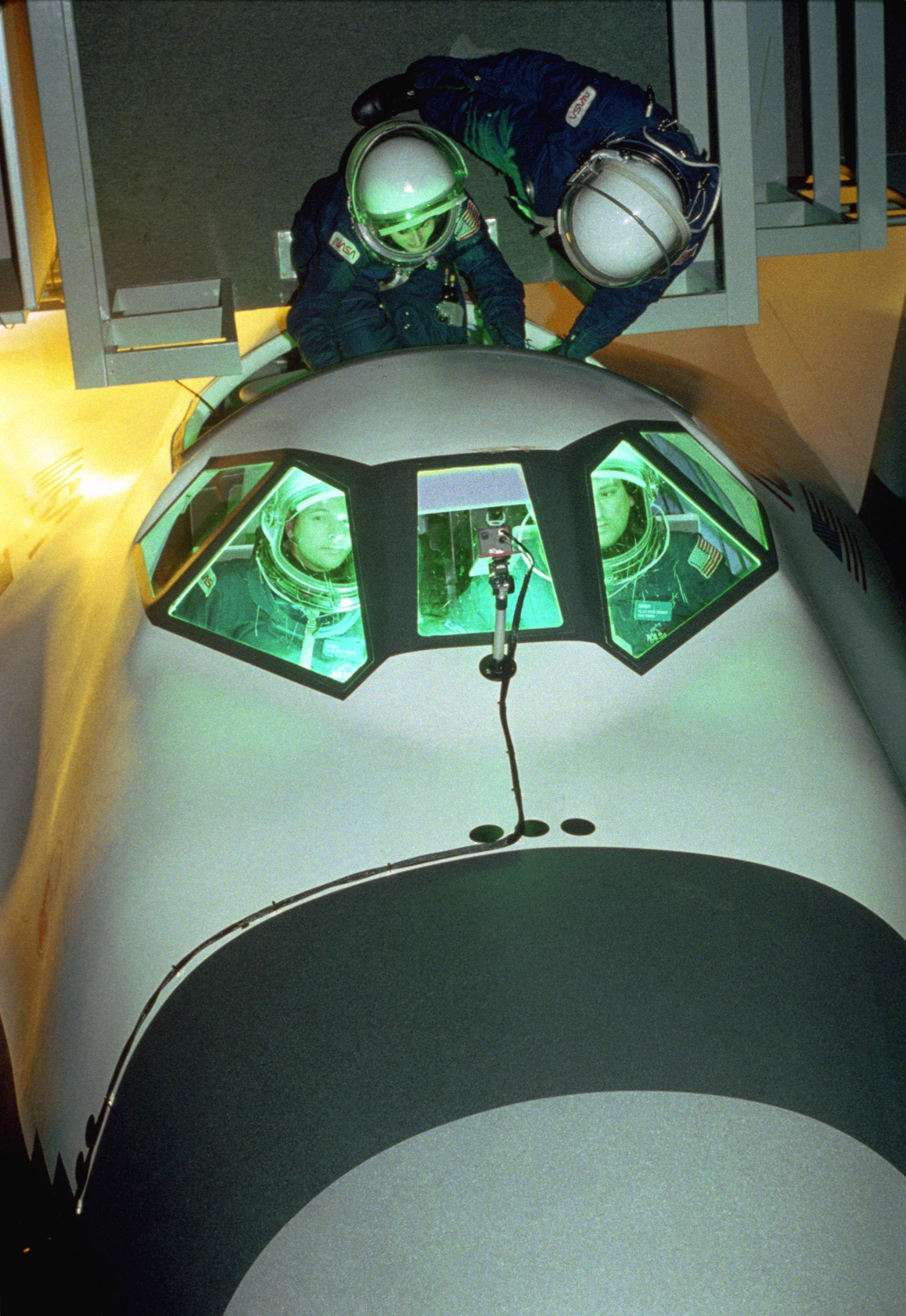
Langley volunteers, wearing flight suits and helmets, were put through a series of tests with the craft placed both vertically and horizontally to simulate launch and landing attitudes.

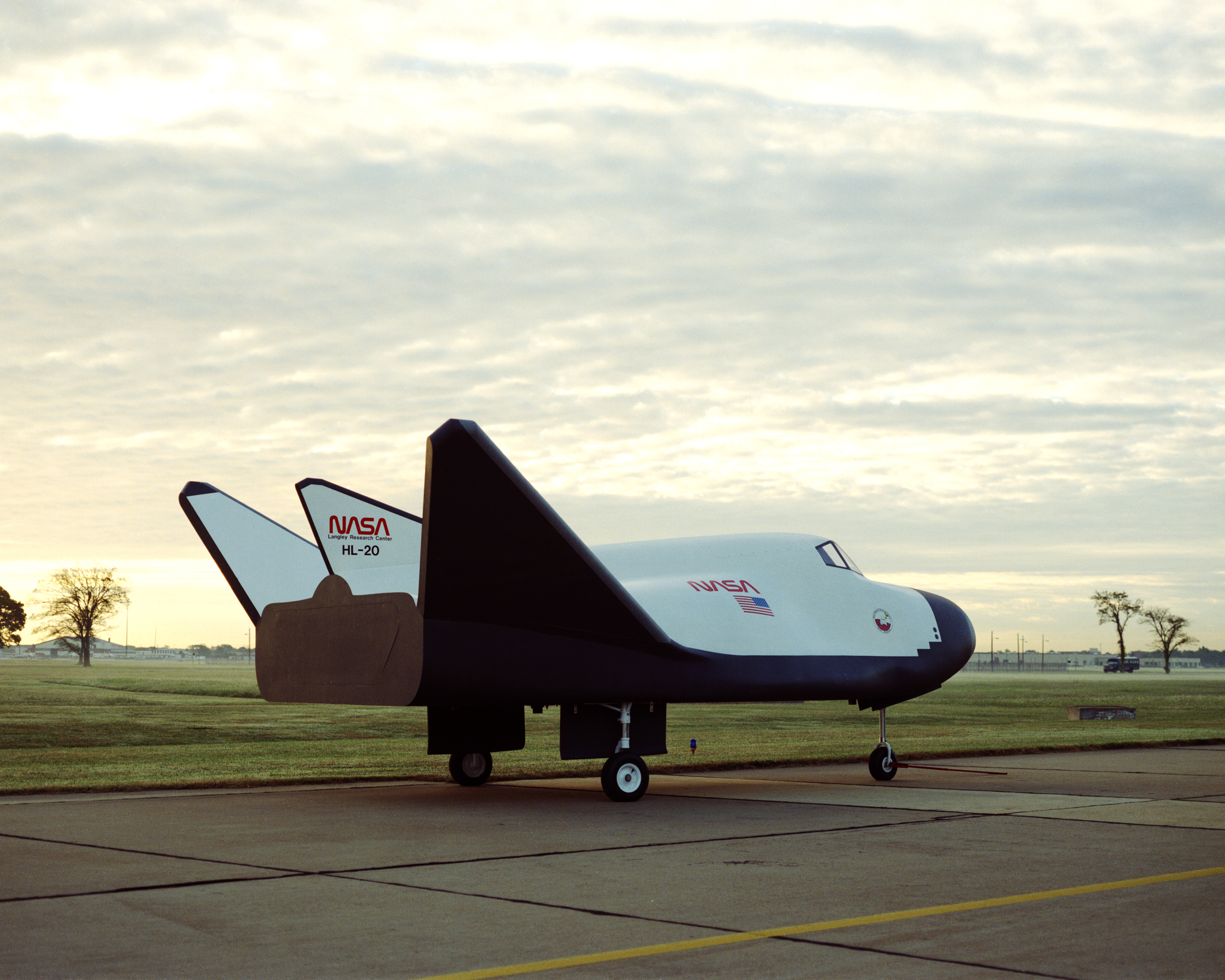
The HL-20 was built at Langley in October 1990 and is a full-scale non-flying mockup. It is currently on loan and displayed at the Wings Over the Rockies Air and Space Museum, Denver, Colorado.

In October 1989, Rockwell International (Space Systems Division) began a year-long contracted effort managed by Langley Research Center to perform an in-depth study of PLS design and operations with the HL-20 concept as a baseline for the study. Using a concurrent engineering approach, Rockwell factored supportable, efficient design and operations measures into defining a detailed, cost-effective design along with a manufacturing plan and operations assessment. A key finding of this study was the realization that while design and technological factors could reduce costs of a new crewed space transportation system, further significant savings would be possible only if a new operations philosophy were adopted which treated PLS in a manner similar to an operational airliner rather than a research and development space vehicle.

In October 1991, the Lockheed Advanced Development Company began a study to determine the feasibility of developing a prototype and operational system. Their objectives were to assess technical attributes, determine flight qualification requirements, and develop cost and schedule estimates.

A cooperative agreement between NASA, North Carolina State University and North Carolina A&T University led to the construction of a full-scale model of the HL-20 PLS for further human factors research on this concept. Students at the universities, with requirements furnished by Langley and guidance from university instructors, designed the research model during their spring 1990 semester with construction following during the summer. The resulting model was used to evaluate human factors such as crew ingress and egress operations, crew volume and habitability arrangements, and visibility requirements for the crew during docking and landing operations.

== Legacy ==
The Dream Chaser spacecraft is based on the HL-20 lifting-body design. It was developed by SpaceDev for the 2004 Commercial Orbital Transportation Services competition and was being developed by Sierra Nevada Corporation for the Commercial Crew Development program (CCDev). The crewed Dream Chaser was not selected by NASA for the final phase of development of commercial crew (CCtCap). However, the cargo Dream Chaser was selected by NASA for its Commercial Resupply Services 2 (CRS2) program.

Orbital Sciences Corporation has also proposed an HL-20 derivative for the second round of CCDev funding, the Prometheus spacecraft.

Both vehicles were proposed to launch unfaired atop a human-rated Atlas V launch vehicle.

== See also ==
- Martin X-23 PRIME
- Kliper
- Mikoyan-Gurevich MiG-105
- BOR-4
- NASA X-38
- Dream Chaser
- Prometheus
- Space Shuttle
- Spaceplane
- HL-42 (spacecraft)
