= Orbital Space Plane Program =

NASA concept to support the International Space Station

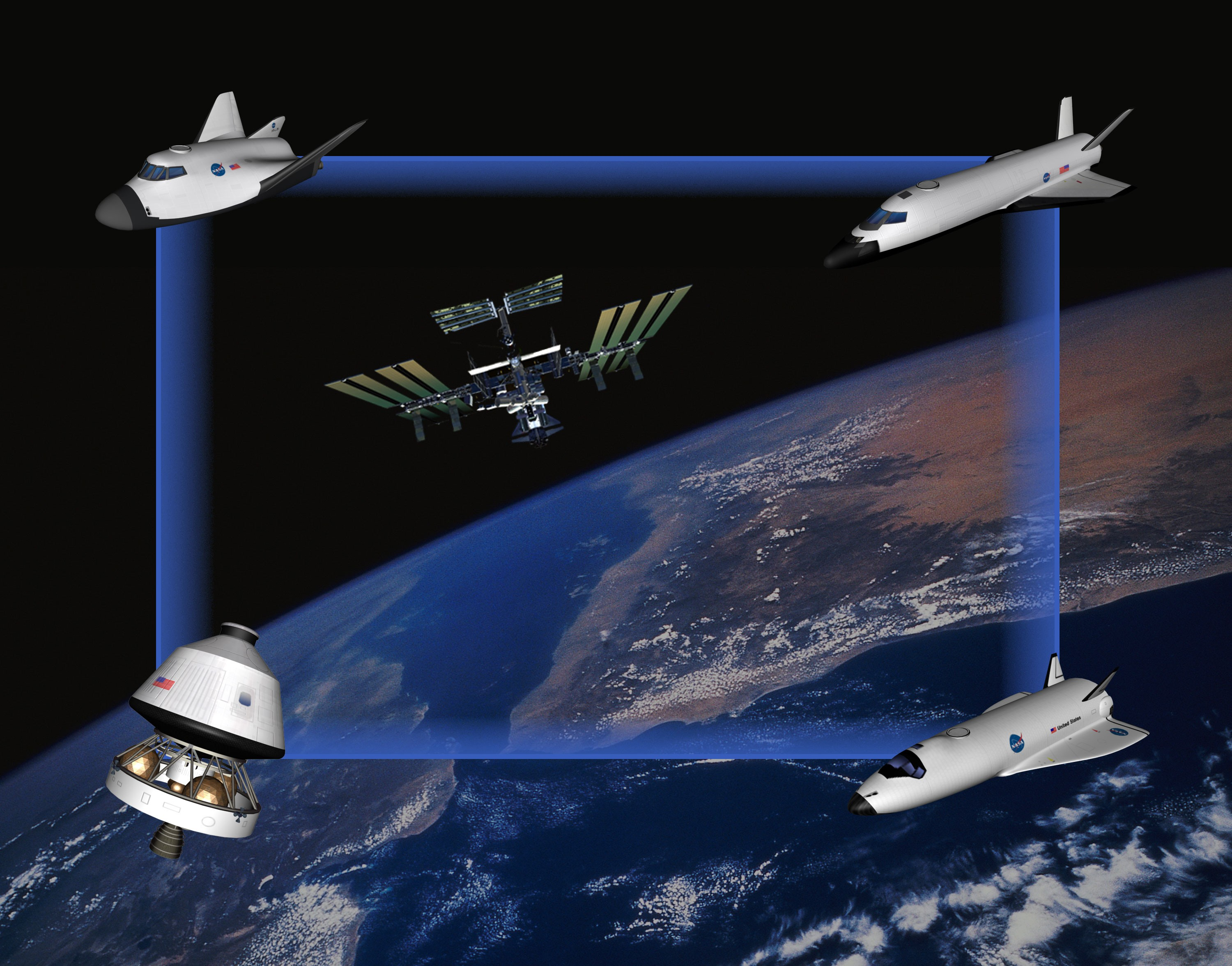
Conceptual drawings of the Orbital Space Plane

The Orbital Space Plane (OSP) program was a NASA spaceplane concept in the early 2000s designed to support the International Space Station requirements for crew rescue, crew transport and contingency cargo transport. It was part of the Space Launch Initiative.

When NASA began the Constellation program in 2004, NASA transferred the knowledge gained on the OSP to the development of the Crew Exploration Vehicle.

== Origin ==
A small, low-cost 'Assured Crew Return Vehicle' (ACRV) had been envisaged for the International Space Station, serving as an emergency evacuation capability. The X-38 was the prototype. This evolved into the Orbital Space Plane concept: rather than being only a lifeboat, the OSP would serve as a crew transport vehicle to and from the ISS. This had been expected to enter service by 2010.

The Space Launch Initiative program began with the award of reusable launch vehicle study contracts in 2000. In November 2002 it was evolved into the Orbital Space Plane Program and the Next Generation Launch Technology Program.

== Function ==
Future versions of the Orbital Space Plane would have been launched on an existing Evolved Expendable Launch Vehicle (EELV) rocket to carry crews to the International Space Station. It was envisaged that the OSP would operate alongside the Space Shuttle with the OSP responsible for crew flights and the shuttle handling construction and cargo flights. At the time, the shuttle program was not yet set for retirement and was thought to be technically viable up until the 2030s. Thus it was expected that the two spacecraft would complement each other throughout the lifespan of the ISS. One advantage of this approach would have been assured human access to space; the lack of this capability was to be highlighted starkly with the loss of Space Shuttle Columbia.

Top level requirements for the Orbital Space Plane and its related systems were approved in February 2003. In March 2003, the program began evaluating system operations to ensure the alignment of systems design between the NASA mission and the contractor design.

== Transfer to the CEV program ==
The Crew Exploration Vehicle program was based on four groups of concepts considered for the physical design of the space plane itself — or the vehicle architecture: a capsule, a lifting body, a sharp body with wings and a blunt body with wings.

After the Columbia accident investigation, the capsule design with a separate escape system was considered the optimal design for crew safety.

== Other program components ==
Other components of the OSP program were the X-37 and the DART.

The X-37 vehicle was designed to flight test advancing technologies to reduce the risk of future reusable launch vehicle systems, including the Orbital Space Plane.

The Demonstration for Autonomous Rendezvous Technology or DART, was another flight demonstrator vehicle designed to test technologies required to locate and rendezvous with other spacecraft. Using onboard guidance sensors, DART would have performed a series of maneuvers around a retired satellite. However, after a successful launch, unknown problems with the guidance system caused the vehicle to run out of thruster fuel prematurely, ending the mission before all objectives could be carried out.

In 2010, Orbital Sciences Corporation reused some work done under OSP program contracts for its Prometheus spacecraft proposal to NASA under phase 2 of the Commercial Crew Development program.

== See also ==
- Hermes
- Dream Chaser
