= Prometheus (spacecraft) =

Proposed Orbital Sciences Corporation spaceplane

Rendering of Prometheus in orbit

Prometheus was a proposed crewed vertical-takeoff, horizontal-landing (VTHL) lifting body spaceplane concept put forward by Orbital Sciences Corporation in late 2010 as part of the second phase of NASA's Commercial Crew Development (CCDev) program.

== Design ==
The Prometheus design was based on an earlier NASA design, the HL-20 Personnel Launch System. Prometheus also included other NASA-funded design improvements to HL-20 by Orbital Sciences that were done some years ago as part of NASA's Orbital Space Plane program. Whereas the HL-20 was a pure lifting body, the Prometheus design was for a Blended Lifting Body (BLB). This design combines volumetric efficiency with superior aerodynamic qualities. Prometheus could have initially carried four astronauts to the International Space Station or future commercial space stations but further development could have increased the seating capacity to six. The baselined launch vehicle was the Atlas V, but the design could have accommodated other launch vehicles. The cost of the development of the Prometheus spacecraft and of upgrading the Atlas V would be between $3.5 and $4 billion.

== Commercial Crew Development program ==
The Vertical Takeoff, Horizontal Landing (VTHL) vehicle would be launched on a human-rated Atlas V rocket but would land on a runway. The initial design would carry a crew of four, but it could carry up to six people or a combination of crew and cargo. In addition to Orbital Sciences, the consortium included Northrop Grumman that would have built the spaceplane and the United Launch Alliance that would have provided the launch vehicle. Virgin Galactic also confirmed it would be teaming with Orbital on the Orbital CCDev 2 project. After failing to be selected for a CCDev phase 2 award by NASA, Orbital announced in April 2011 it would likely wind down its efforts to develop a commercial crew vehicle.

== See also ==
- Dream Chaser (spacecraft) - another HL-20 derived proposed spacecraft put forward in 2010 by Sierra Nevada Corporation
