= Chinese reusable experimental spacecraft =

Chinese reusable spacecraft

Reusable Experimental Spacecraft
Spacecraft properties
- Spacecraft type: Reusable spacecraft

Start of mission
- Rocket: Long March 2F
- Launch site: Jiuquan Satellite Launch Center

End of mission
- Landing site: Lop Nur, Runway 05

Orbital parameters
- Reference system: Geocentric orbit
- Regime: Low Earth orbit
- Periapsis altitude: 332 km (206 mi)
- Apoapsis altitude: 348 km (216 mi)
- Inclination: 50.2°
- Period: 90.0 minutes (?)

A photograph of Chinese reusable experimental spacecraft taken by a satellite.

The Chinese reusable experimental spacecraft (Chinese: 可重复使用试验航天器; pinyin: Kěchóngfùshǐyòng shìyàn hángtiānqì, CSSHQ) is the first reusable spacecraft produced by China. It embarked upon its initial orbital mission on 4 September 2020. According to media reports, the spacecraft is launched into Earth orbit in a vertical configuration while enclosed within the payload fairing of a rocket like a traditional satellite, but it returns to Earth via autonomous runway landing. In the absence of any official descriptions of the spacecraft or photographic depictions thereof, some observers have speculated that the spacecraft may resemble the X-37B spaceplane of the United States in both form and function.

Another reusable robotic spaceplane, Shenlong (simplified Chinese: 神龙; traditional Chinese: 神龍; pinyin: shén lóng; lit. 'divine dragon'), is currently in development. Only a few pictures have appeared in publications since it was revealed in late 2007.

== Operational history ==
The state-owned Xinhua News Agency reported in 2017 that China planned to launch a reusable spacecraft in 2020 designed to "fly into the sky like an aircraft".

=== Mission 1 ===
The spacecraft's first mission began on 4 September 2020 at 07:30 UTC when it was launched into low earth orbit via a Long March-2F/T3 carrier rocket; the launch occurred at China's Jiuquan Satellite Launch Center, located in the Gobi Desert. According to the Xinhua News Agency, "(a)fter a period of in-orbit operation, the spacecraft will return to the scheduled landing site in China. It will test reusable technologies during its flight, providing technological support for the peaceful use of space".

For launching payloads like the spaceplane, the Long March 2F/G needs four cusps added to its fairing to accommodate the payload (as seen post-launch), which led to speculation that the spacecraft resembles the US' Boeing X37-B.

Unofficial reports indicate that the spacecraft is part of the Shenlong spaceplane, which is claimed to be similar to the Boeing X-37B.

On 6 September 2020, two days after the launch, the spacecraft successfully returned to the Earth. According to observers Marco Langbroek and Jonathan McDowell, the spacecraft's landing site was an airbase located at Lop Nur, China.

On 7 September 2020, commercial satellite reconnaissance company Planet Labs published a satellite photo of a 3.1-mile (5.0 km) runway at Lop Nur, taken shortly after the landing of the spaceplane. Astronomer Jonathan McDowell of the Harvard–Smithsonian Center for Astrophysics speculated that one of the dots visible on the image of the runway was the Chinese spaceplane.

On 8 September 2020, Spaceflight Now reported that US analysts had detected the launch at 7:30 GMT on the fourth of September and that the craft's orbital axes were 332 kilometres (206 mi) by 348 kilometres (216 mi), and inclined by 50.2 degrees with respect to the equator.

=== Mission 2 ===
On 4 August 2022 at around 16:00 UTC, the spacecraft was launched for a second time, again on top of a Long March 2F rocket. The spacecraft was observed to have raised its orbit on 25 August 2022 to a near-circular 597 by 608-kilometre orbit. While aloft it deployed at least one object that may have been a small satellite or monitoring craft. On 8 May 2023, the spacecraft returned to Earth after 276 days in orbit.

=== Mission 3 ===
On 14 December 2023 at around 14:12 UTC, the spacecraft was launched for a third time, again on top of a Long March 2F rocket. It has released at least seven objects into orbit. On 6 September 2024, 01:10 UTC, the spacecraft returned to Earth after 266 days and 10 hours in orbit.

The spaceplane was photographed in orbit, from the ground, by an amateur space photographer.

=== Mission 4 ===
The reusable spaceplane was launched for the fourth time from the Jiuquan Satellite Launch Center near 3:57 UTC on 7 February 2026.

On 26 October 2026, the United States Defense Intelligence Agency released its 2026 edition of Challenges to Security in Space. In this unclassified intelligence report on the state of orbital threats to the United states and its allies, it disclosed a higher resolution photo of the space plane on orbit by a Maxar Technologies satellite. The knowledge that a photograph was taken by an American satellite was first revealed by Col. John Patrick of the United States Space Force at the Open Space Forum in South Korea in 2024. Taken on 28 May 2024 by a Maxar technologies (now Vantor company) WorldView-3 satellite, this photo becomes the first public images of the Shenlong space plane.

=== List of missions ===
Flight	Launch (UTC)	Landing (UTC)	Launcher	Duration	Notes	Status
1	4 September 2020, 07:30	6 September 2020	Long March 2F/T	2 days	First Chinese autonomous orbital runway landing; First flight; Landed at Lop Nur	Success
2	4 August 2022, 16:00	8 May 2023	Long March 2F/T	276 days	Landed at Lop Nur; Spacecraft performed orbital maneuvers	Success
3	14 December 2023, ~14:12	6 September 2024, 01:10	Long March 2F/T	266 days	Landed at Lop Nur; Spacecraft performed orbital maneuvers	Success
4	7 February 2026, ~03:57		Long March 2F/T	287 days (in progress)		In progress

== Specifications ==
The only information available about the program is the photos taken from the ground by an amateur in late July 2024, revealing structures similar to solar panels or antennas. The payload fairings used, having been photographed after their fall to the ground, showed extensions that could house wings and help constrain the size and wingspan of the craft. Without a clear link being established between these two projects, in 2020, Chen Hongbo, of China Aerospace Science and Technology Corporation (CASC), the main contractor for China's space agency, said during a 2017 interview that China's space plane would be able to be re-used up to 20 times. Chen said the vehicle's first stage would use a scramjet engine.

== History ==
Images of an aerodynamic scaled model, ready to be launched from under the fuselage of a Xian H-6 bomber, were first published on 11 December 2007. Code named Program 863-706, the Chinese name of this spacecraft was revealed as "Shenlong Spaceplane" (神龙空天飞机). These images, possibly taken in late 2005, show the vehicle's black reentry heat shielding, indicating a reusable design, and its engine assembly. The first sub-orbital flight of the Shenlong reportedly took place on 8 January 2011.

Earlier, images of the High-enthalpy Shock Waves Laboratory wind tunnel of the Chinese Academy of Sciences (CAS) State Key Laboratory of High-Temperature Gas Dynamics (LHD) were published in the Chinese media. Tests with speeds up to Mach 20 were reached in around 2001.

Somewhere around 2024 Maxar Technologies imaged the craft in orbit.

== See also ==
- Boeing X-37 – American reusable spacecraft
