= Martin Knutson =

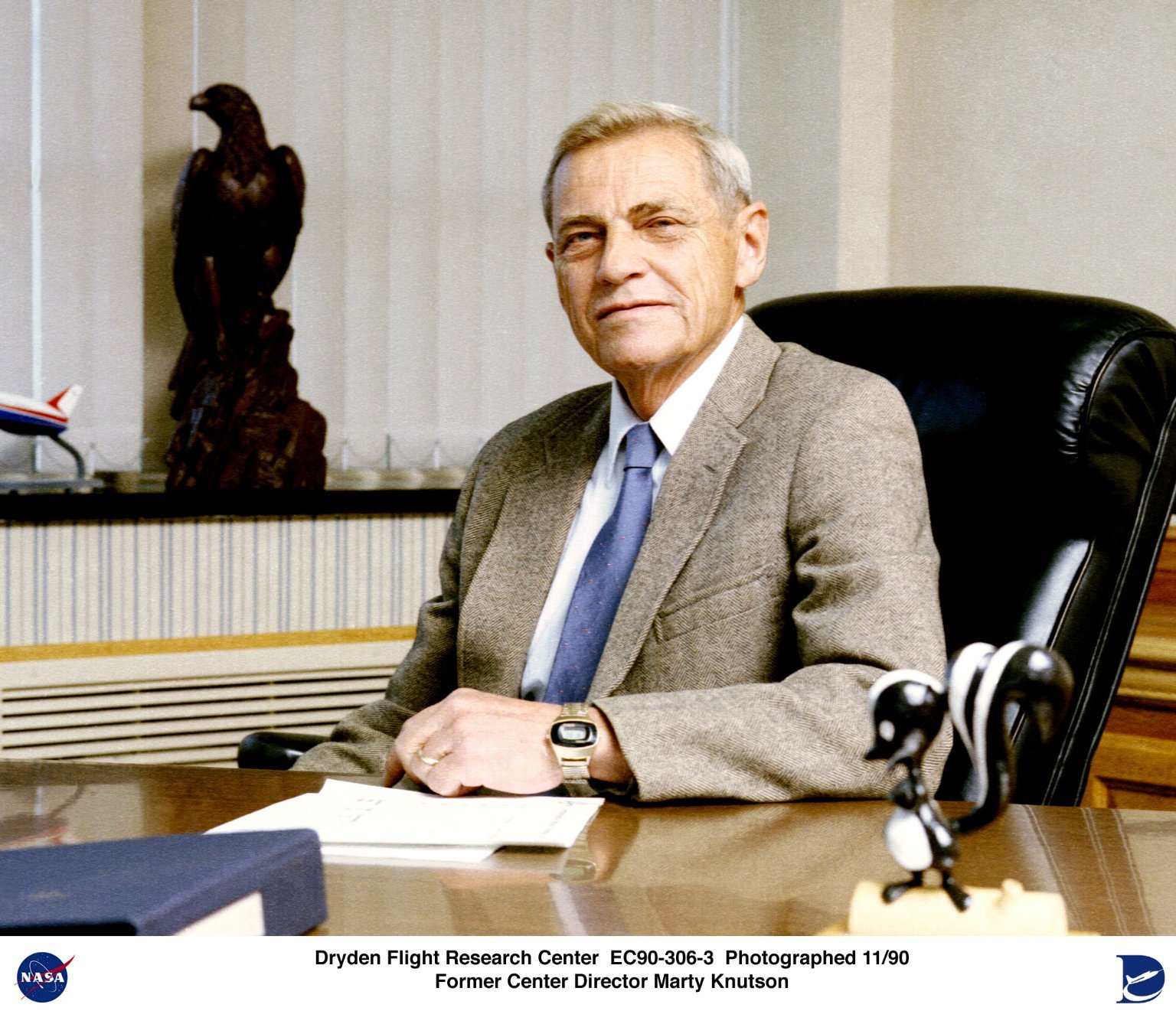
Martin A. Knutson in 1990

Martin A. "Marty" Knutson (May 31, 1930 – December 11, 2013) served as Director of Flight Operations for NASA's Ames Research Center at Moffett Field, CA, and also as site manager of the Ames-Dryden Flight Research Facility at Edwards Air Force Base in CA, at that time a satellite facility of Ames, from May 1984 through late 1990. Born in St. Louis Park, he attended the University of Minnesota, majoring in electrical engineering. Knutson joined the U.S. Navy, before transferring to the Air Force as an aviation cadet in 1950. Following service in Korea and participation in developmental testing and operational missions in the F-84 and F-86, he was recruited to fly the U-2 reconnaissance aircraft for the Central Intelligence Agency in 1955. He was assigned to Det A, the first U-2 detachment to deploy operationally.

On July 9, 1956 he flew the third overflight of the USSR, Mission 2020 in a U-2A. The sortie from Wiesbaden took him over Berlin, Riga, Kaunas, Vilnius and Minsk. After re-assignment to Det B he flew Operation TOUCHDOWN, the 20th Soviet overflight, exactly three years later, (also in a U-2A). This mission was launched from Peshawar, Pakistan and landed nine hours later in the Iranian desert. He retired from the USAF in 1970.

Knutson joined NASA in 1971 as manager of U-2 flight operations at Ames and was one of several pilots who flew the aircraft on Earth resources science missions. He later flew the ER-2, an updated model of the U-2 that remains in service at NASA Dryden today.

During Knutson's six years at Dryden he maintained the facility at operational readiness for Space Shuttle landings and replaced Dryden's aging fleet of F-104 support aircraft with F/A-18 Hornets. He also provided leadership for numerous flight research projects including the X-29 forward-swept-wing technology demonstrator; the Controlled Impact Demonstration, the F-15 Digital Electronic Engine Control project that integrated propulsion and flight controls, the Pegasus air-launched rocket for placing small payloads into low Earth orbit; the CV-990 Landing Systems Research aircraft that tested improved braking systems for the Space Shuttle; and the F-18 High Alpha Research Vehicle.

After the Air Force announced the impending retirement of the SR-71 Blackbird, Knutson successfully sought to acquire three of the airplanes for Dryden. In late 1990 he returned to Ames where he served as chief of flight operations until his retirement in 1997.

His awards include the Meritorious Service Medal and the Distinguished Flying Cross, both from the Air Force, NASA's Outstanding Leadership Award, and the Presidential Rank of Meritorious Executive. He was an Associate Fellow of the Society of Experimental Test Pilots and a charter member of the federal government's Senior Executive Service.
