= 2012 Boeing 727 crash experiment =

Televised crash test experiment

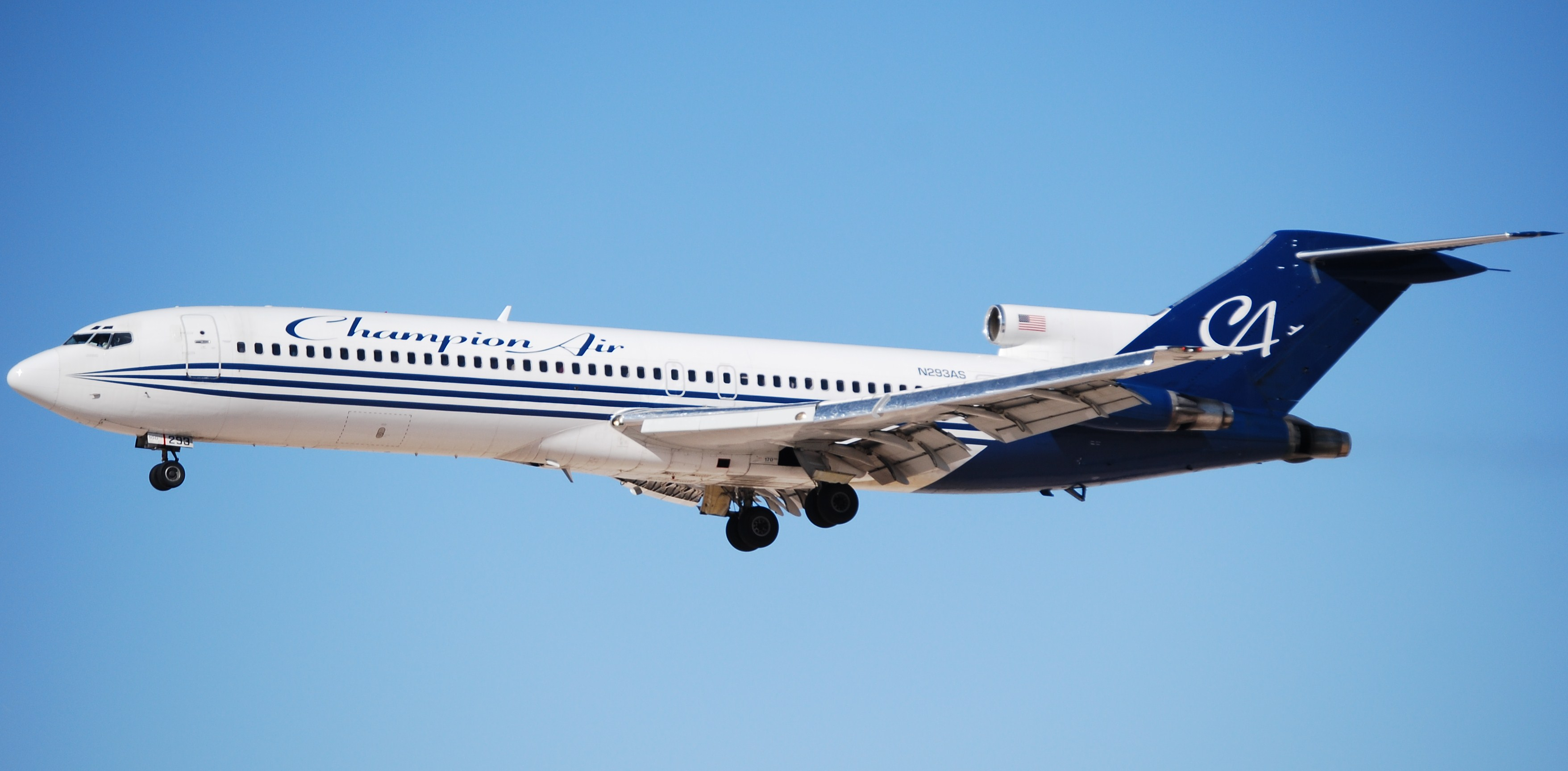
- The experiment aircraft while still in service with Champion Air

Crash experiment
- Date: 27 April 2012
- Summary: Remote controlled deliberate crash into terrain
- Site: Laguna Salada, Mexico; 32.36°N 115.66°W

Aircraft
- Aircraft type: Boeing 727-212 Advanced
- Aircraft name: Big Flo
- Operator: Warner Bros. Discovery
- Registration: XB-MNP
- Flight origin: Mexicali International Airport

On 27 April 2012, a multinational team of television studios staged an airplane crash near Mexicali, Mexico. An unmanned Boeing 727-200, fitted with numerous cameras, crash test dummies and other scientific instruments, was flown into the ground. The exercise was filmed for television.

== Aircraft and test site ==
The aircraft used was a Boeing 727-200 purchased by the television production companies, registration XB-MNP (formerly N293AS).

The site in Mexico was chosen because authorities in the United States would not allow the test to take place. The aircraft's original owner was Singapore Airlines. The last United-States-based owner was Broken Wing LLC of Webster Groves, Missouri, who then exported it and transferred it to a Mexican production company. Broken Wing is also the company that planned and executed the experiment. The aircraft had been leased to Bob Dole's 1996 presidential election campaign by the then-owner AvAtlantic.

== Flight ==
Several federal permits by the Mexican government were needed before the remote controlled flight and crash could be performed. In addition, the Mexican authorities stipulated that the aircraft had to be flown by humans during part of the flight, since it would be flying over a populated area.

The flight was piloted by captain Jim Bob Slocum, then controlled remotely by Chip Shanle, a former United States Navy pilot who worked at American Airlines.

The airplane took off from Mexicali International Airport in Mexicali, with three flight crew and three support jumpers, as well as a number of crash dummies, and with a chase plane Cessna Skymaster following close behind. As the flight progressed towards the Sonoran Desert of Baja California in Mexico, its occupants parachuted to safety via the 727's ventral airstair. Slocum was the last one to leave the jet, three minutes before impact. Shanle then flew the jetliner by remote control, from the chase plane.

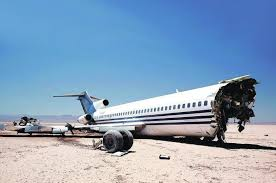
Aftermath at the crash site. Note that the cockpit has broken off.

The jetliner hit the ground at 140 miles per hour (120 kn; 230 km/h), with a descent rate of 1,500 feet per minute (460 m/min). Upon impact, the Boeing 727 broke up into several sections, the main landing gear collapsing with the cockpit being torn off the fuselage.

The zone of the crash had been cordoned off by security teams, as well as Mexican police and military, for the safety of the public.

== Aftermath ==
The crash site received a full environmental cleanup and salvage operation, under the supervision of Mexican authorities.

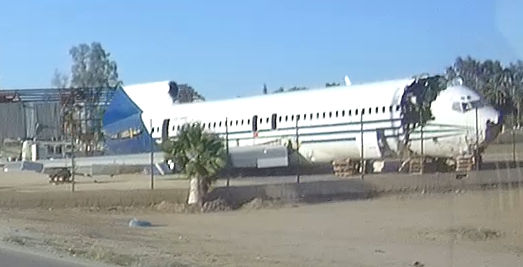
Large sections from the crashed plane stored alongside Highway 5 in March 2016

Most of the large sections of the plane that survived the crash – including the majority of the fuselage, as well as the detached cockpit and nose section – were moved to a field next to Federal Highway 5 south of Mexicali at 32°30′05″N 115°23′48″W, and were still there in December 2022. However, satellite imagery taken in 2026 shows that nothing of the aircraft remains at the site.

== Study result ==
The conclusion for this test was that, in a case like this, passengers at the front of an aircraft would be the ones most at risk in a crash. Passengers seated closer to the airplane's wings would have suffered serious but survivable injuries such as broken ankles. The test dummies near the tail section were largely intact, so any passengers there would have likely walked away without serious injury. However, in other crashes, such as when the tail hits the ground first, as was the case with Asiana Airlines flight 214, in which a Boeing 777-200ER crashed short of the runway at San Francisco International Airport, the reverse might apply. The brace position was found to be protective against concussion and spinal injuries, but created additional loads on the legs that could result in fractured legs or ankles. Additionally, the aircraft's wiring and cosmetic panels were shown to have collapsed into the passenger compartment, creating debris hazards and obstacles to evacuation.

== Television program ==
A television program about the experiment was produced by Discovery Channel (United States), Dragonfly Film and Television Productions (United Kingdom), ProSieben (Germany), and Channel 4 (United Kingdom).

The crash was the subject of a Discovery Channel television series Curiosity 2-hour episode "Plane Crash". The episode was aired on 7 October 2012 (28 October on Discovery Channel Canada, and 17 December on Discovery Channel India), and it was narrated by Josh Charles.

The 1-hour-35-minute episode "The Plane Crash" aired on Channel 4 in Britain on 11 October 2012. The program garnered criticism in Britain, as it was aired less than two weeks after the Sita Air Flight 601 air crash in Nepal.

ProSieben planned to air the documentary special before the end of 2012 and the French channel France 5 broadcast it on 23 June 2013.

== See also ==
- Controlled Impact Demonstration
