= David Hedgley =

American computer scientist (1937–2024)

David Rice Hedgley, Jr.
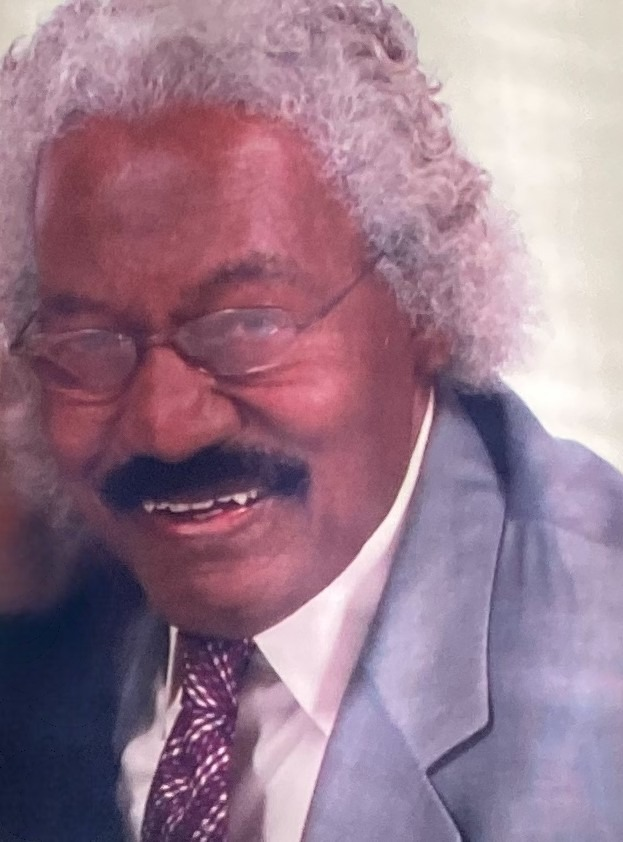
- Born: January 21, 1937; Chicago, Illinois, United States
- Died: April 13, 2024; Seal Beach, California, United States
- Education: Virginia Union University; California State University, Northridge; University of Somerset
- Known for: Hidden line removal, Computer-automated routing of printed circuit board
- Scientific career
- Fields: Computer Science, Mathematics
- Workplaces: Armstrong Flight Research Center

David Rice Hedgley Jr. (born January 21, 1937 in Chicago, Illinois and died April 13, 2024 in Seal Beach, California) was an American computer scientist and mathematician who made major contributions to the field of computer graphics. One of his contributions was the solution of the hidden-line problem in computer 3D graphics.
