= Marta Bohn-Meyer =

American pilot and engineer

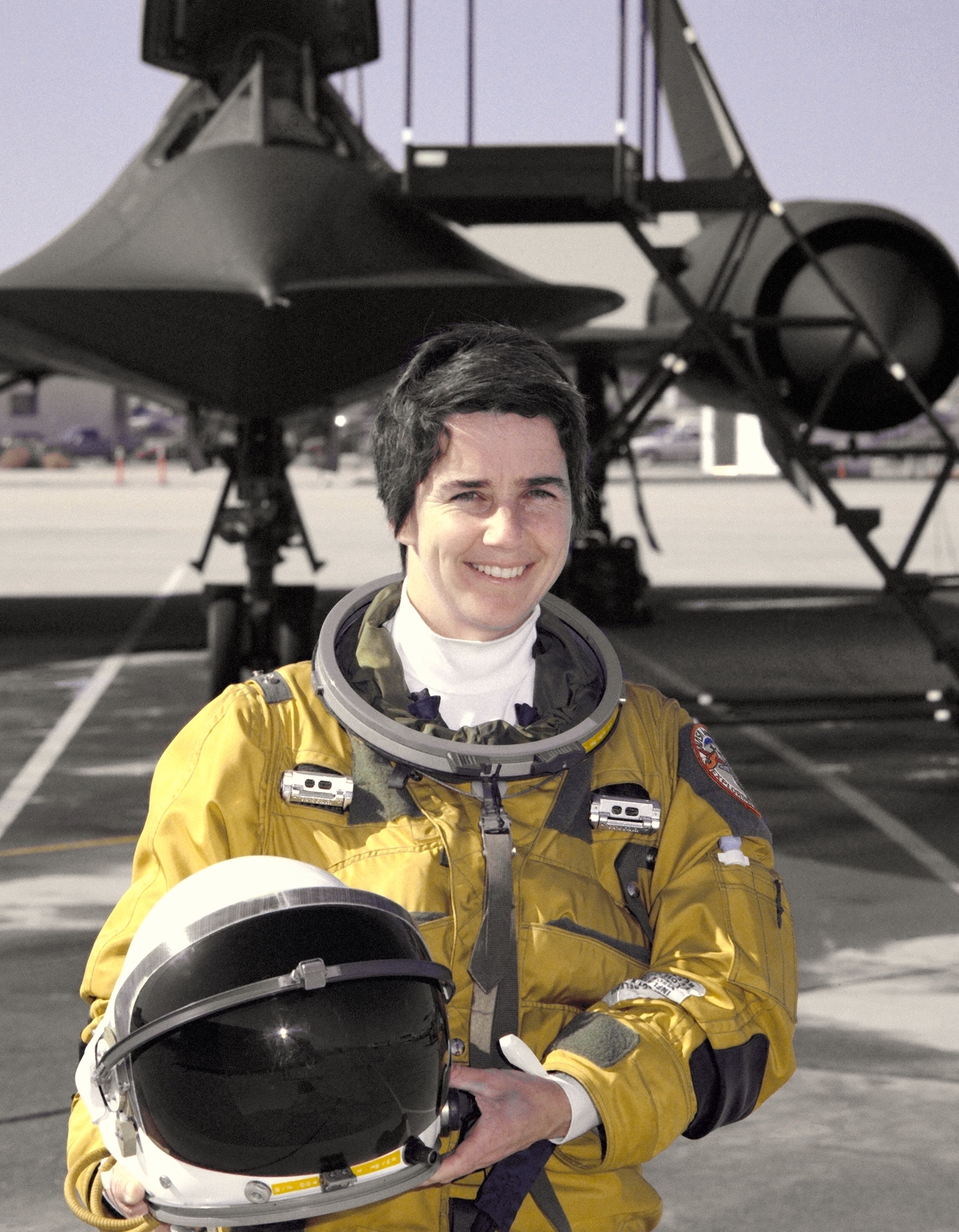
- Born: 18 August 1957
- Died: 18 September 2005 (aged 48)
- Scientific career
- Institutions: Dryden Flight Research Center

Marta Bohn-Meyer (18 August 1957 – 18 September 2005) was an American pilot and engineer.

Marta Bohn-Meyer was born in Amityville, New York. Marta Bohn-Meyer served as chief engineer of the NASA Dryden Flight Research Center. Bohn-Meyer was involved in a variety of research projects at NASA — she was the first female crewmember assigned to the Lockheed SR-71, serving as navigator during studies of aerodynamics and propulsion that used the SR-71 as a testbed. She was also project manager in a study of advanced laminar flow wing design using the General Dynamics F-16XL aircraft.

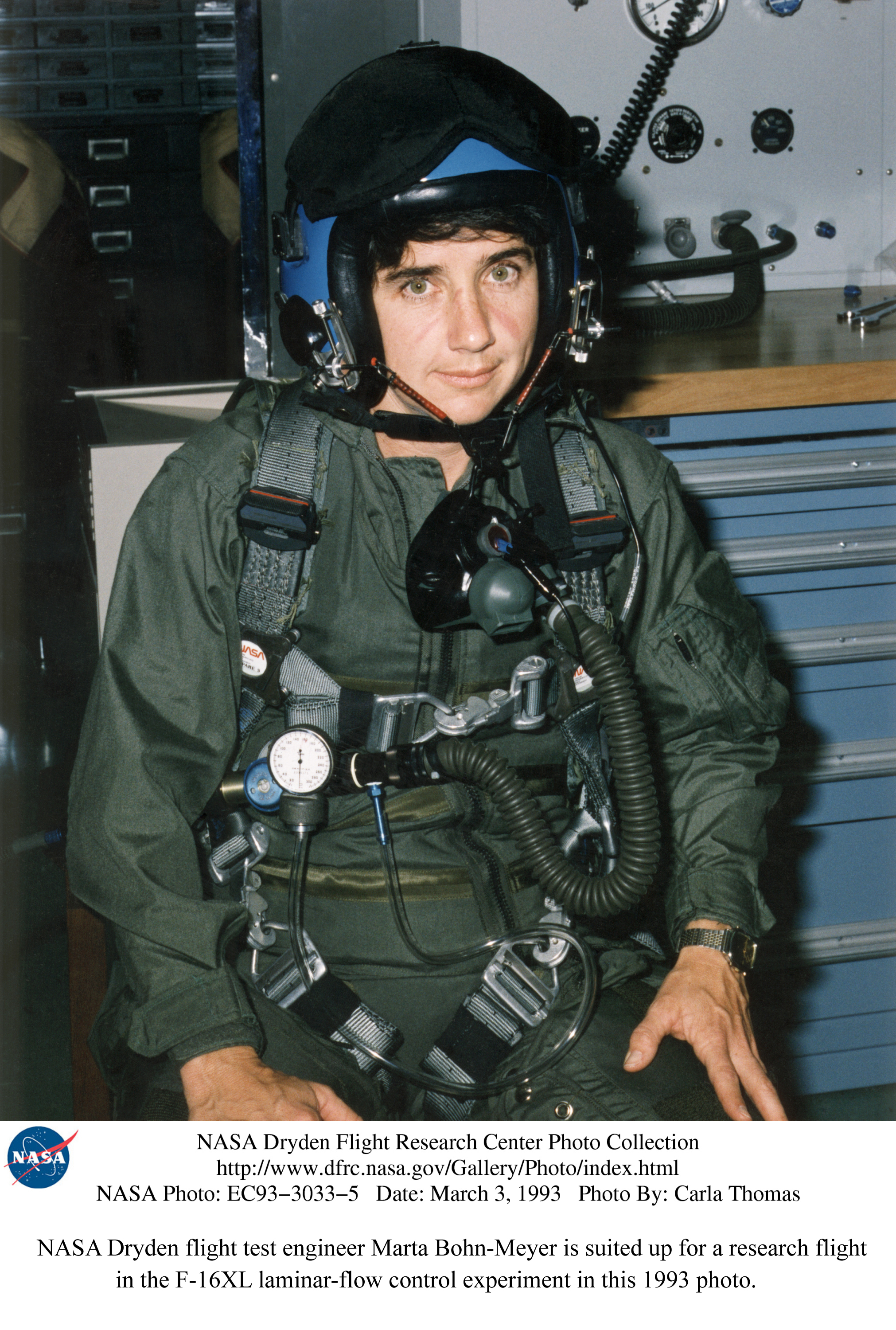
NASA Dryden flight test engineer Marta Bohn-Meyer is suited up for a research flight in the F-16XL laminar-flow control experiment in this 1993 photo.

Bohn-Meyer was an accomplished Unlimited aerobatic pilot, and was twice a member of the United States Unlimited Aerobatic Team. She also served as Team Manager in 2005. Bohn-Meyer died while practicing for the 2005 U.S. National Aerobatic Championships when the Giles 300 aerobatic aircraft she was piloting crashed in Yukon, Oklahoma, near the Clarence E. Page Municipal Airport. The cause of the crash was deemed to be from catastrophic failure of the front hinge of the canopy - which apparently incapacitated her and led to the crash.

Her husband was Robert R. Meyer, Jr., a project manager and flight test engineer at Dryden.

Bohn-Meyer was a 1979 graduate from Rensselaer Polytechnic Institute in Troy, N.Y. At that time she met her husband, Bob Meyer, during an internship at NASA. In addition to excelling in her aerospace career, Bohn-Meyer served as a role model to young girls interested in technical career fields. She could often be found in classrooms encouraging young women to explore career fields that have so long been dominated by men.

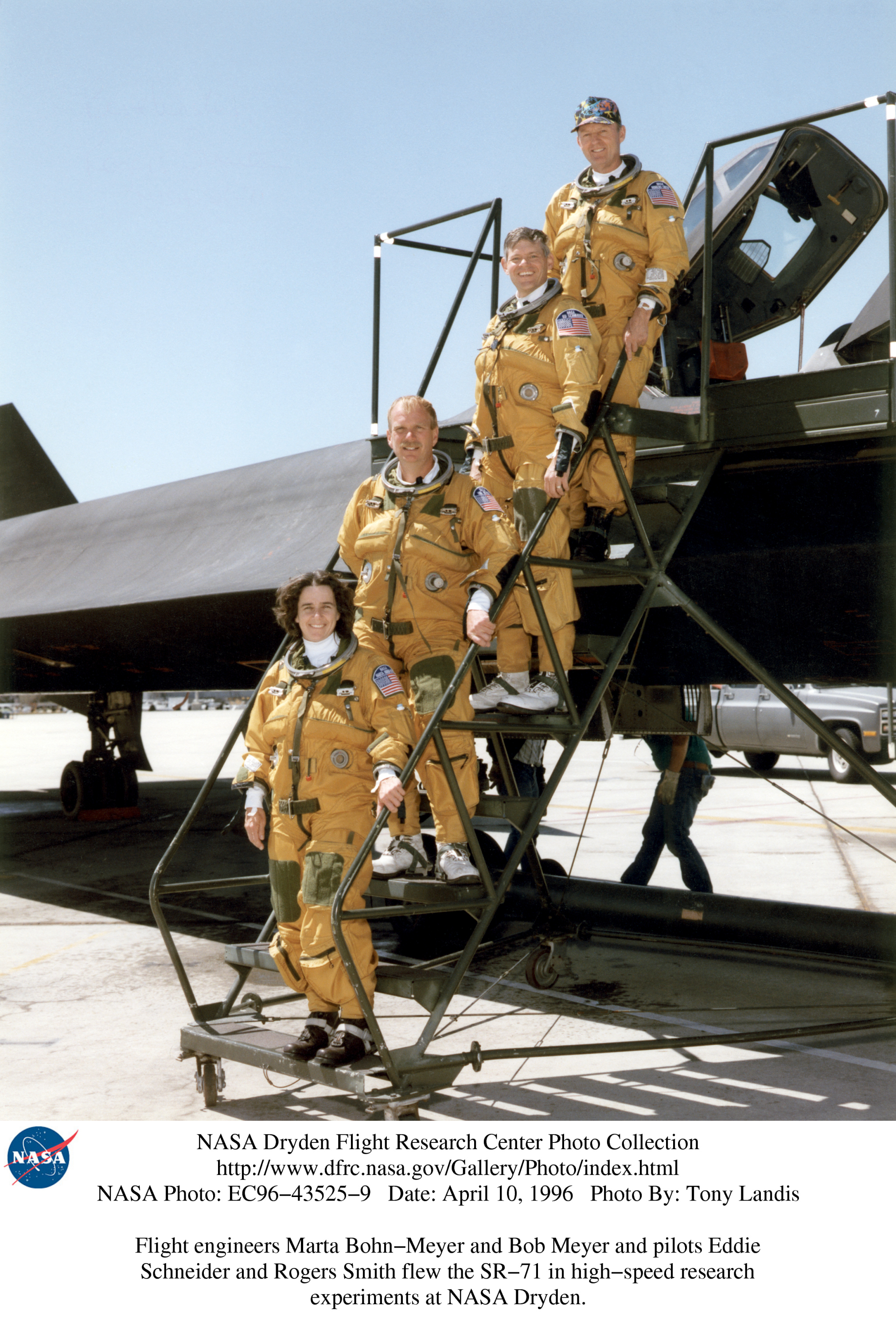
Flight engineers Marta Bohn-Meyer and Bob Meyer and pilots Ed Schneider and Rogers Smith flew the triple-sonic SR-71 in high-speed research experiments at NASA Dryden.
