= Armstrong Flight Research Center =

NASA research facility in Southern California

Coordinates: 34°57′07″N 117°53′08″W

Neil A. Armstrong Flight Research Center
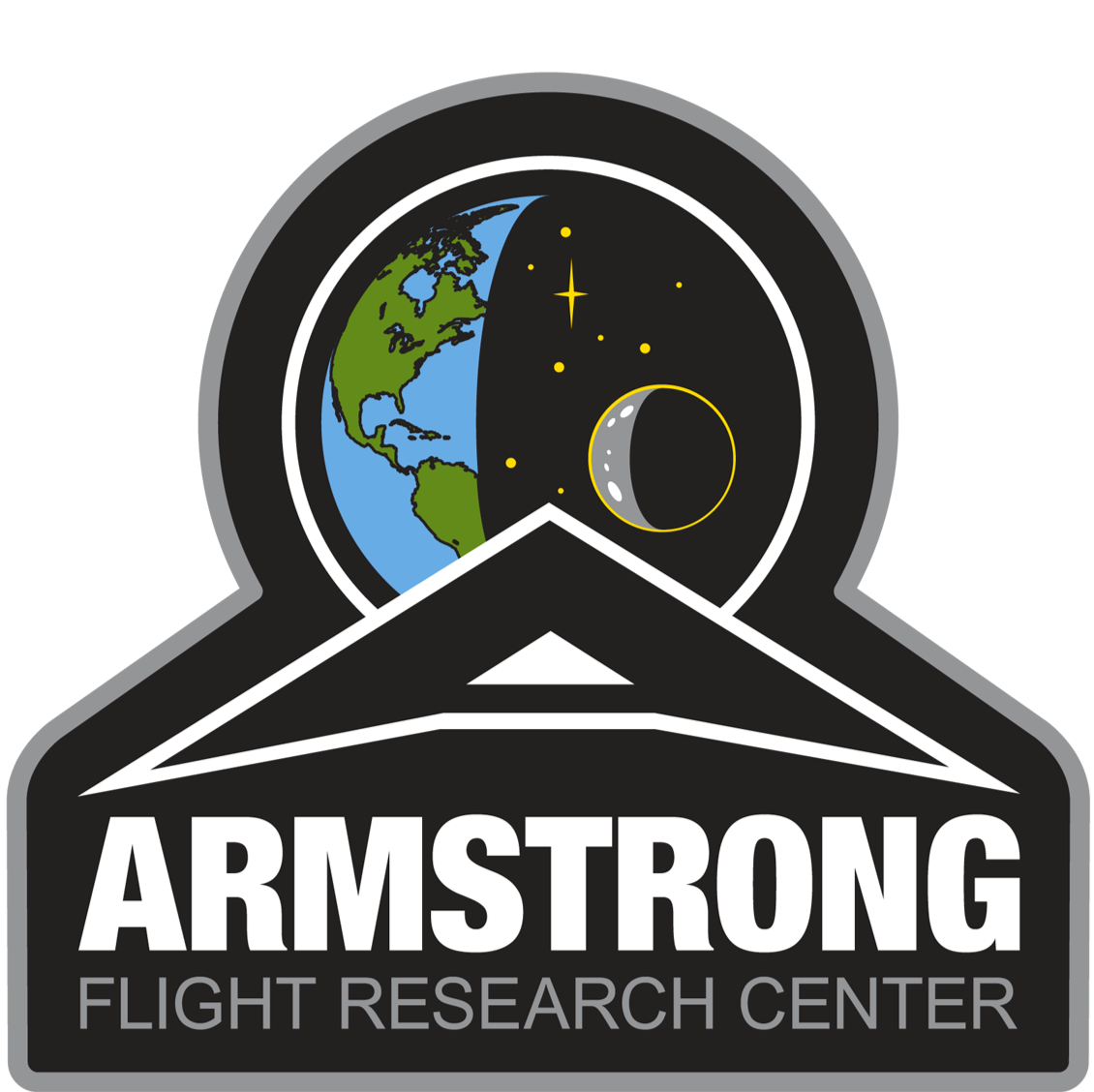

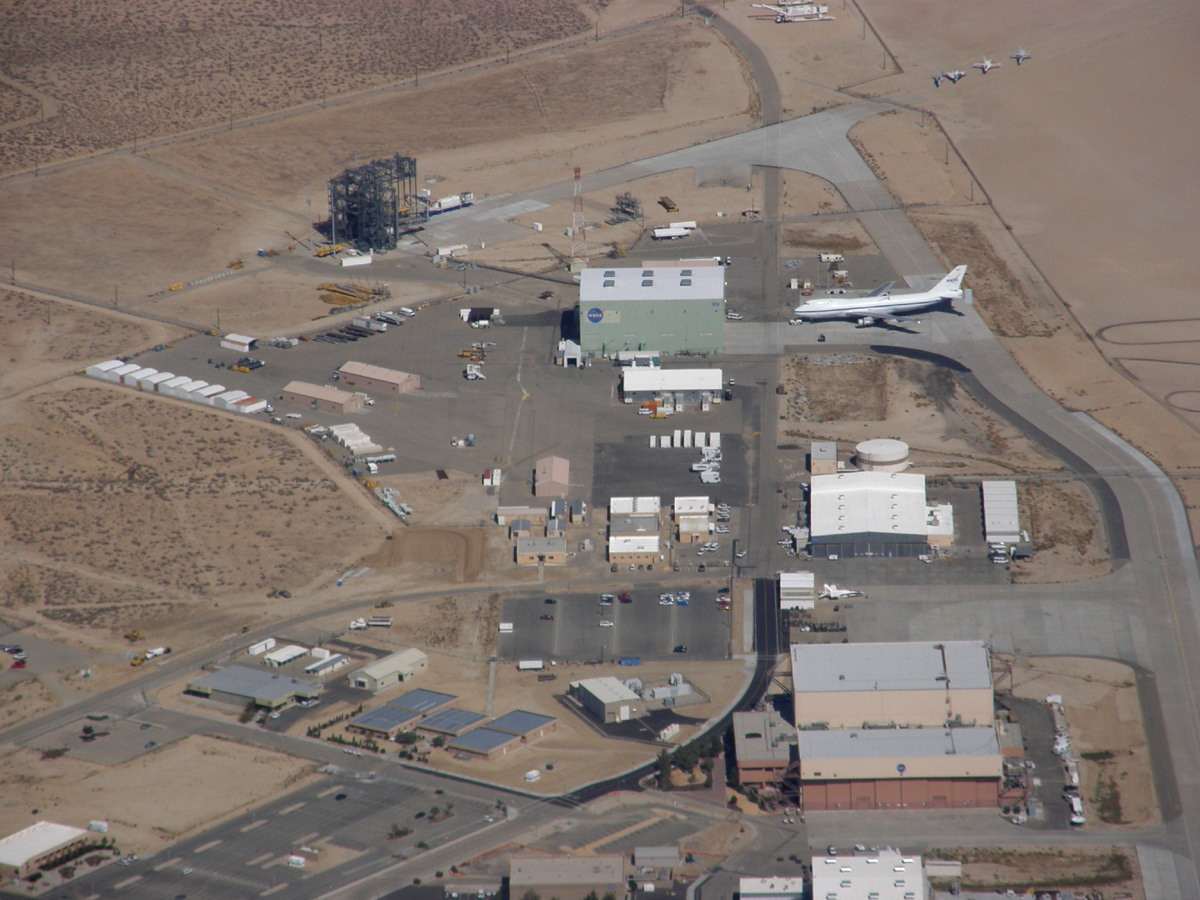
- Armstrong Flight Research Center from the air

Agency overview
- Preceding agencies: Dryden Flight Research Center; Muroc Flight Test Unit; High-Speed Flight Research Station
- Jurisdiction: U.S. federal government
- Headquarters: Edwards Air Force Base, California, United States
- Agency executive: Troy Asher, director
- Parent agency: NASA
- Website: nasa.gov/armstrong/

The historical logo of then Dryden Flight Research Center (before March 2014).

The NASA Neil A. Armstrong Flight Research Center (AFRC) is an aeronautical research center operated by NASA. Its primary campus is located inside Edwards Air Force Base in California and is considered NASA's premier site for aeronautical research. AFRC operates some of the most advanced aircraft in the world and is known for many aviation firsts, including supporting the first crewed airplane to exceed the speed of sound in level flight (Bell X-1), highest speed by a crewed, powered aircraft (North American X-15), the first pure digital fly-by-wire aircraft (F-8 DFBW), and many others. AFRC operated a second site next to Air Force Plant 42 in Palmdale, California, known as Building 703, once the former Rockwell International/North American Aviation production facility. There, AFRC housed and operated several of NASA's Science Mission Directorate aircraft including the Stratospheric Observatory for Infrared Astronomy (SOFIA), a DC-8 Flying Laboratory, a Gulfstream C-20A UAVSAR and ER-2 High Altitude Platform. In 2024, following the retirements of SOFIA and the DC-8, NASA vacated Building 703, as the continued lease of the large hangar was no longer justified or a prudent use of taxpayer dollars. As of 2023, Bradley Flick is the center's director.

Established as the National Advisory Committee for Aeronautics Muroc Flight Test Unit (1946), the center was subsequently known as the NACA High-Speed Flight Research Station (1949), the NACA High-Speed Flight Station (1954), the NASA High-Speed Flight Station (1958) and the NASA Flight Research Center (1959). On 26 March 1976, the center was renamed the NASA Ames-Dryden Flight Research Center (DFRC) after Hugh L. Dryden, a prominent aeronautical engineer who died in office as NASA's deputy administrator in 1965 and Joseph Sweetman Ames, who was an eminent physicist, and served as president of Johns Hopkins University. The facility took its current name on 1 March 2014, honoring Neil Armstrong, a former test pilot at the center and the first human being to walk on the Moon.

AFRC was the home of the Shuttle Carrier Aircraft (SCA), a modified Boeing 747 designed to carry a Space Shuttle orbiter back to Kennedy Space Center if one landed at Edwards.

The center long operated the oldest B-52 Stratofortress bomber, a B-52B (dubbed Balls 8 after its tail number, 008) that had been converted to a drop test aircraft. 008 dropped many supersonic test vehicles, from the X-15 to its last research program, the hypersonic X-43A, powered by a Pegasus rocket. Retired in 2004, the aircraft is on display near Edwards' North Gate.

== Location ==
Though Armstrong Flight Research Center has always been located on the shore of Rogers Dry Lake, its precise location has changed over the years. It currently resides on the northwestern edge of the lake bed, just south of North Gate. Visitors must obtain access to both Edwards AFB and NASA AFRC.

The Rogers Dry Lake bed offers a unique landscape for flight research, namely dry conditions, few rainy days per year, and large, flat, and open spaces in which emergency landings can be performed. At times, the bed can host a runway length of over 40,000 feet. It is home to a compass rose that measures 5,200 feet across, and where aircraft can land into the wind in any direction.

== List of current projects ==
- X-59 QueSST
- X-66 Sustainable Flight Demonstrator
- UAS in the NAS
- TGALS

== Historic projects ==
=== Douglas Skyrocket ===
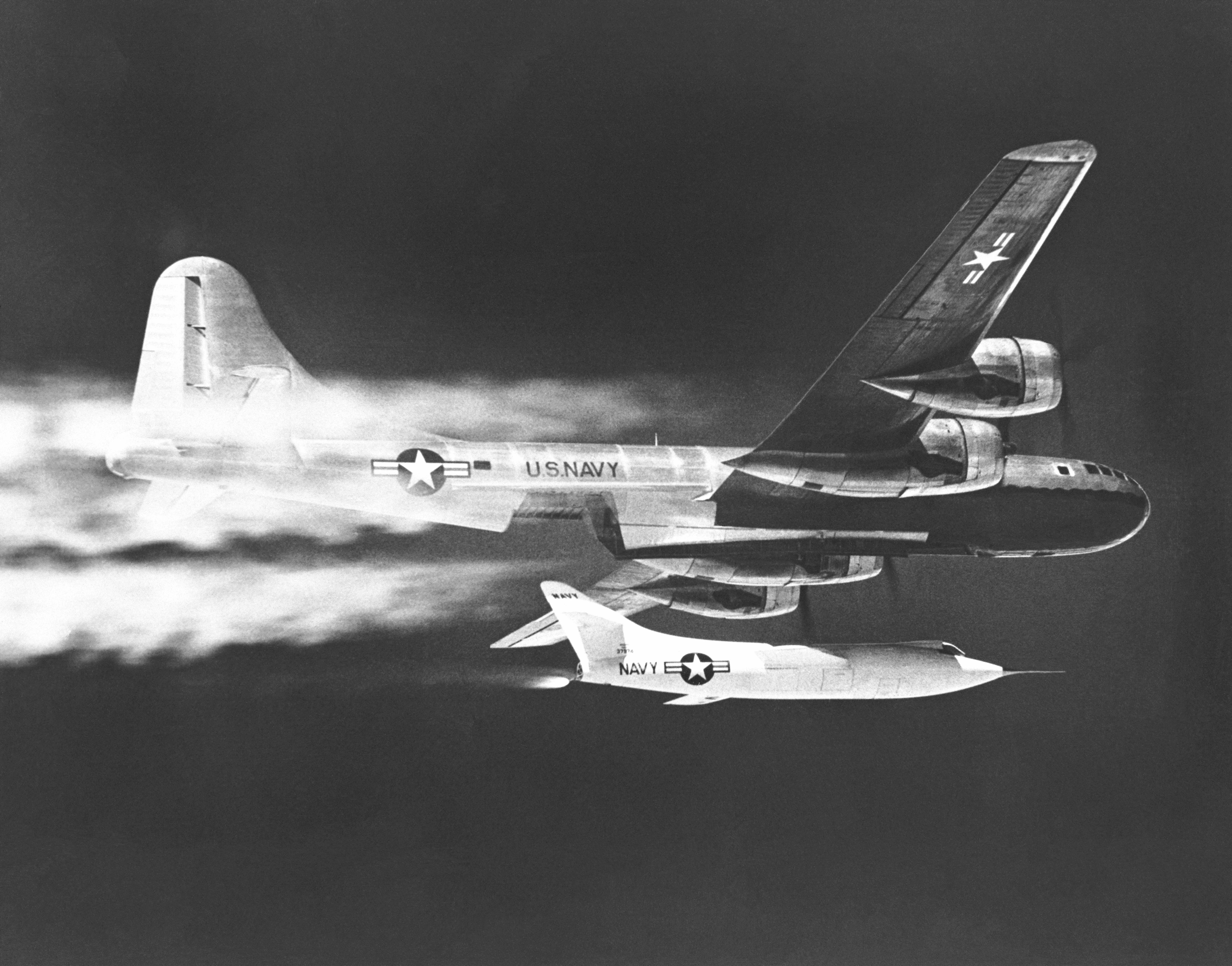
A Douglas D-558-2 Skyrocket being dropped from a B-29 Superfortress.

NASA's predecessor, NACA, operated the Douglas D-558-2 Skyrocket. A successor to the Bell X-1, the D-558-2 could operate under rocket or jet power. It conducted extensive tests into aircraft stability in the transsonic range, optimal supersonic wing configurations, rocket plume effects, and high-speed flight dynamics. On November 20, 1953, the Douglas Skyrocket became the first aircraft to fly at over twice the speed of sound when it attained a speed of Mach 2.005. Like the X-1, the D-558-2 could be air-launched using a B-29 Superfortress. Unlike the X-1, the Skyrocket could also takeoff from a runway with the help of JATO units.

=== Controlled Impact Demonstration ===
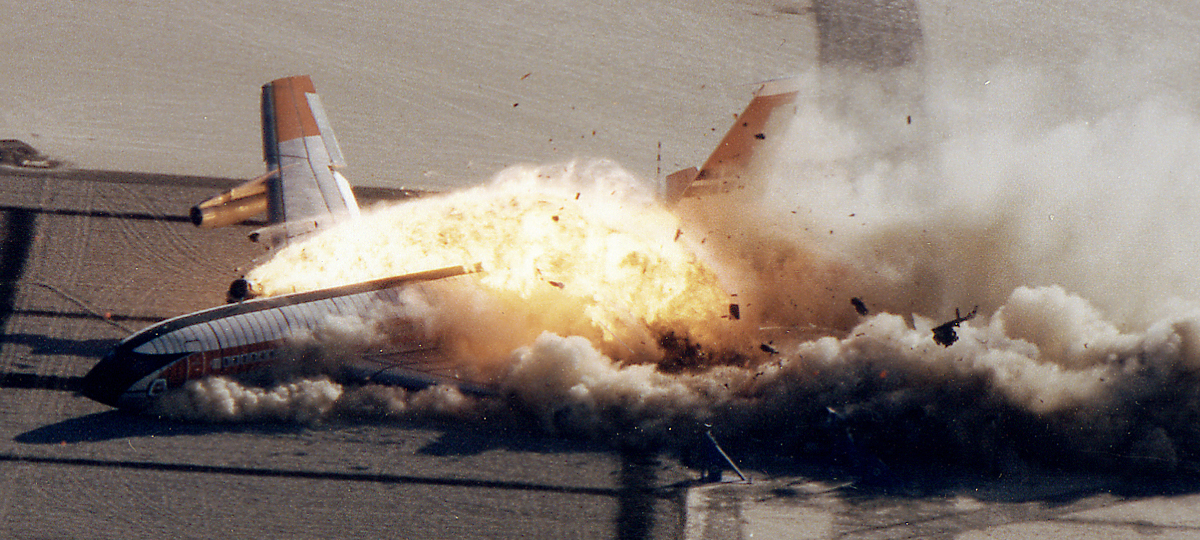
A remotely piloted Boeing 720 is destroyed in the Controlled Impact Demonstration.

The Controlled Impact Demonstration was a joint project with the Federal Aviation Administration to research a new jet fuel that would decrease the damage due to fire in the crash of a large airliner. On 1 December 1984, a remotely piloted Boeing 720 aircraft was flown into specially built wing openers which tore the wings open, fuel spraying everywhere. Despite the new fuel additive, the resulting fireball was huge; the fire still took an hour to fully extinguish.

Even though the fuel additive did not prevent a fire, it still prevented the combustion of some fuel which flowed over the fuselage of the aircraft, and served to cool it, similar to how a conventional rocket engine cools its nozzle. Also, instrumented crash test dummies were in the airplane for the impact, and provided valuable research into other aspects of crash survivability for the occupants.

=== Linear Aerospike SR-71 Experiment ===
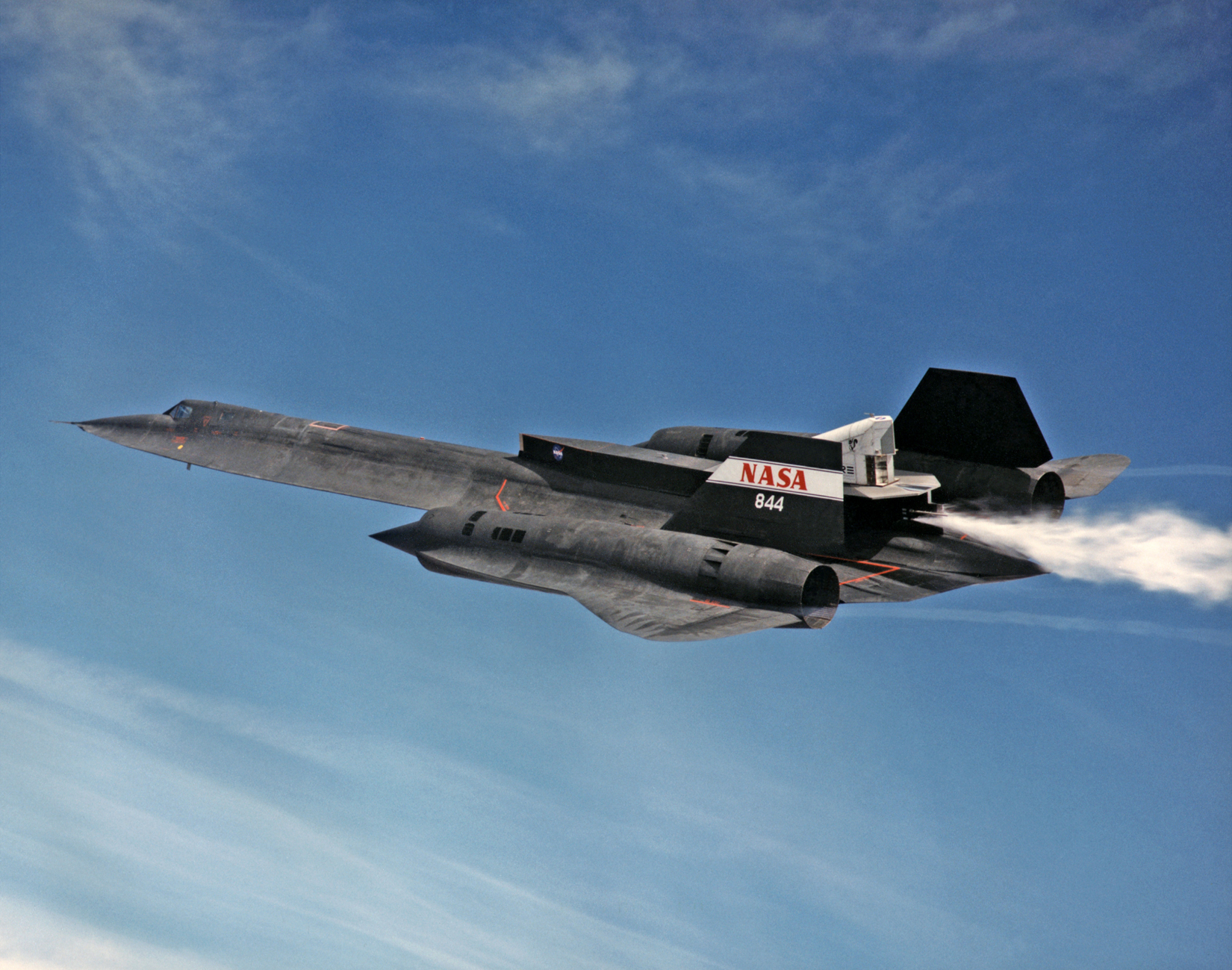
Linear Aerospike SR-71 Experiment

LASRE was a NASA experiment in cooperation with Lockheed Martin to study a reusable launch vehicle design based on a linear aerospike rocket engine. The experiment's goal was to provide in-flight data to help Lockheed Martin validate the computational predictive tools they developed to design the craft. LASRE was a small, half-span model of a lifting body with eight thrust cells of an aerospike engine. The experiment, mounted on the back of an SR-71 Blackbird aircraft, operated like a kind of "flying wind tunnel."

The experiment focused on determining how a reusable launch vehicle's engine plume would affect the aerodynamics of its lifting-body shape at specific altitudes and speeds reaching approximately 340 m/s (760 mph). The interaction of the aerodynamic flow with the engine plume could create drag; design refinements look to minimize that interaction.

=== Lunar Landing Research Vehicle ===
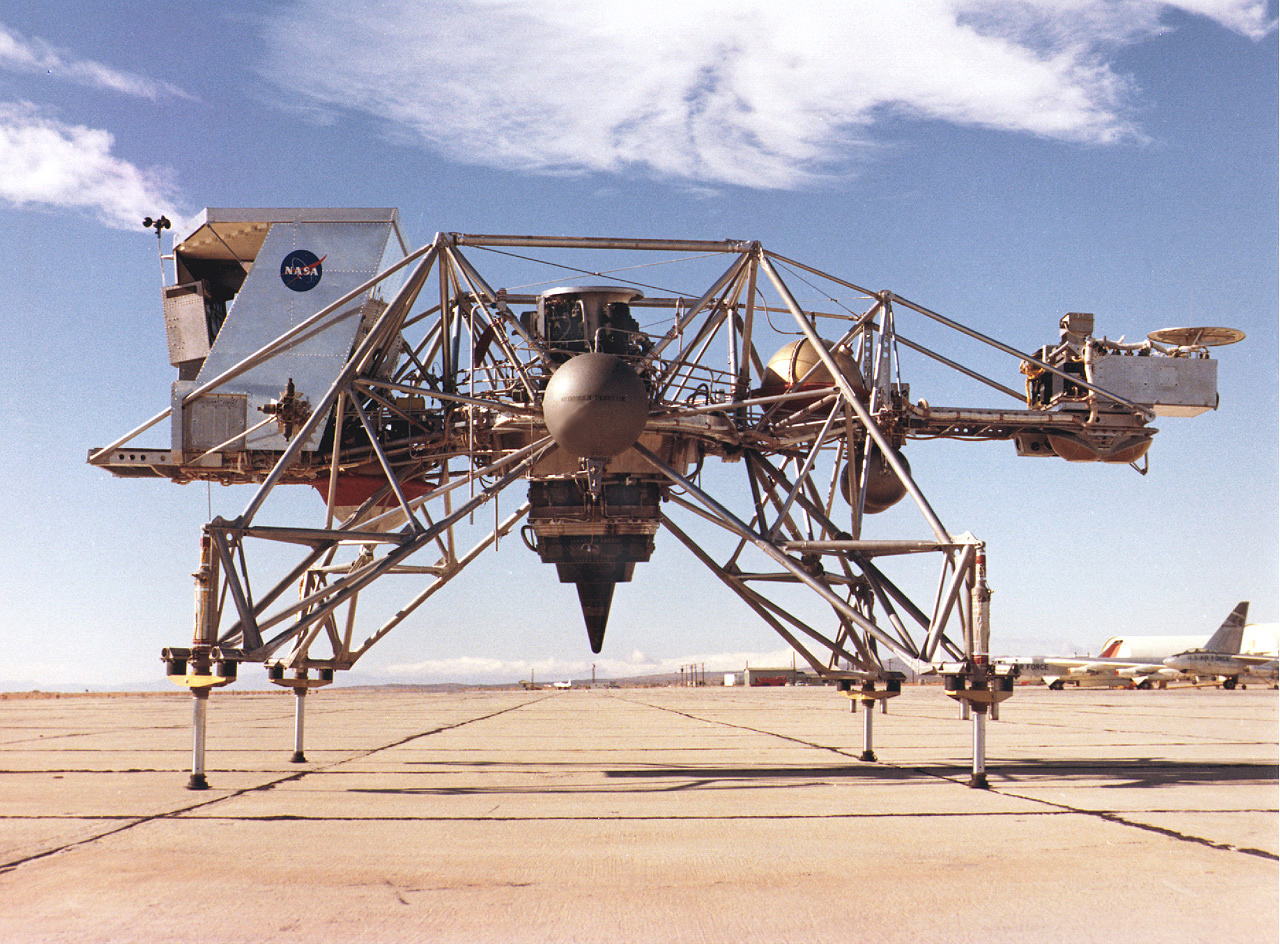
The Lunar Landing Research Vehicle.

The Lunar Landing Research Vehicle or LLRV was an Apollo Project era program to build a simulator for the Moon landing. The LLRVs, humorously referred to as "Flying Bedsteads," were used by the FRC, now known as the Armstrong Flight Research Center, at Edwards Air Force Base, California, to study and analyze piloting techniques needed to fly and land the Apollo Lunar Module in the moon's airless environment.

== Aircraft on display ==
- NB-52B Balls 8 NASA 008
- Bell X-1E AF Ser. No. 46-063
- F-104N - NASA 826
- F-8 Supercritical wing - NASA 810
- F-8 Digital Fly-by-wire - NASA 802
- F-15B ACTIVE - NASA 837
- Grumman X-29 - NASA 849
- Lockheed SR-71 Blackbird LASRE - NASA 844
- Northrop HL-10 Lifting Body - NASA 804
- Rockwell HiMAT

== Gallery ==
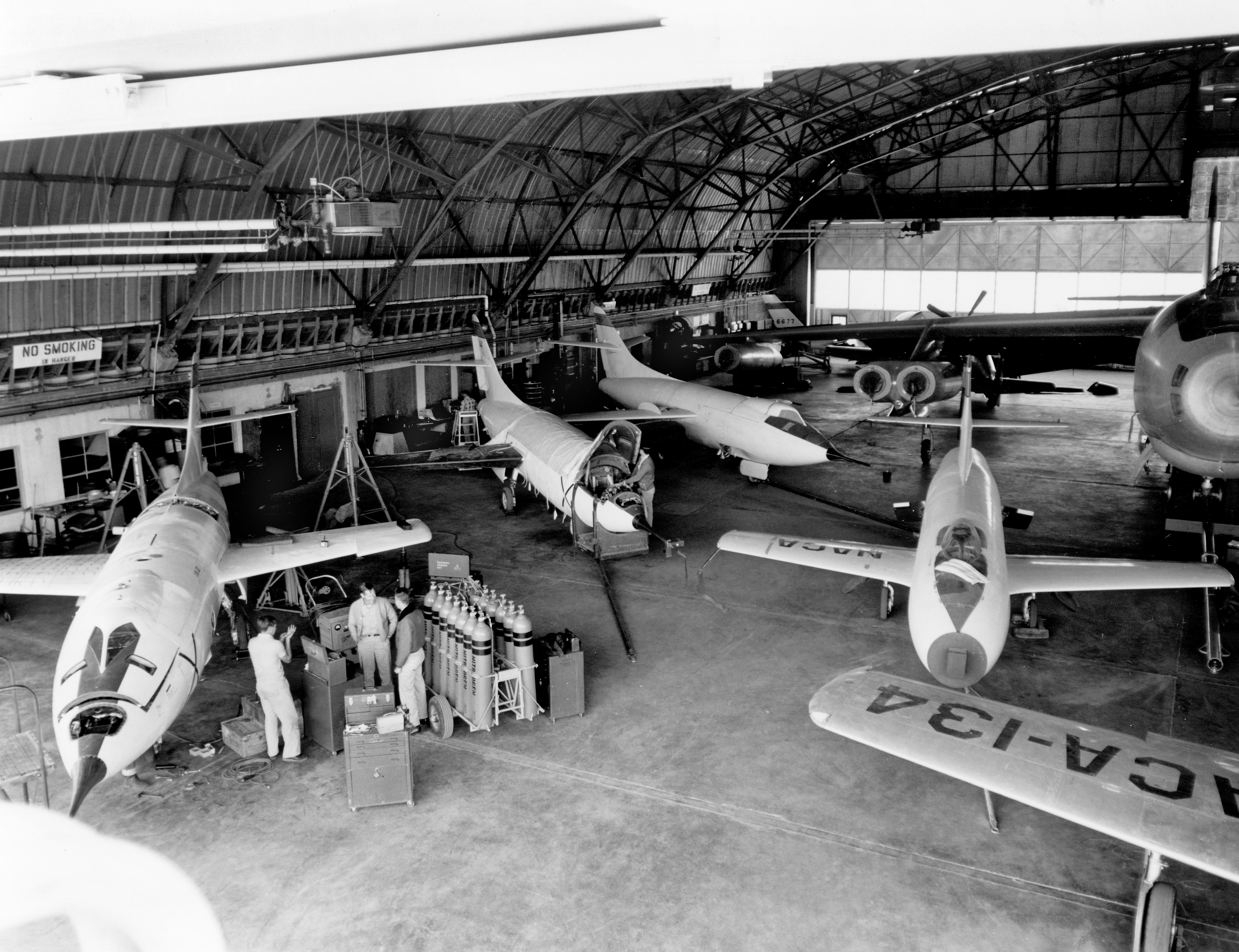
These aircraft in Dryden's NACA hangar show some of the research activities being undertaken in the 1950s

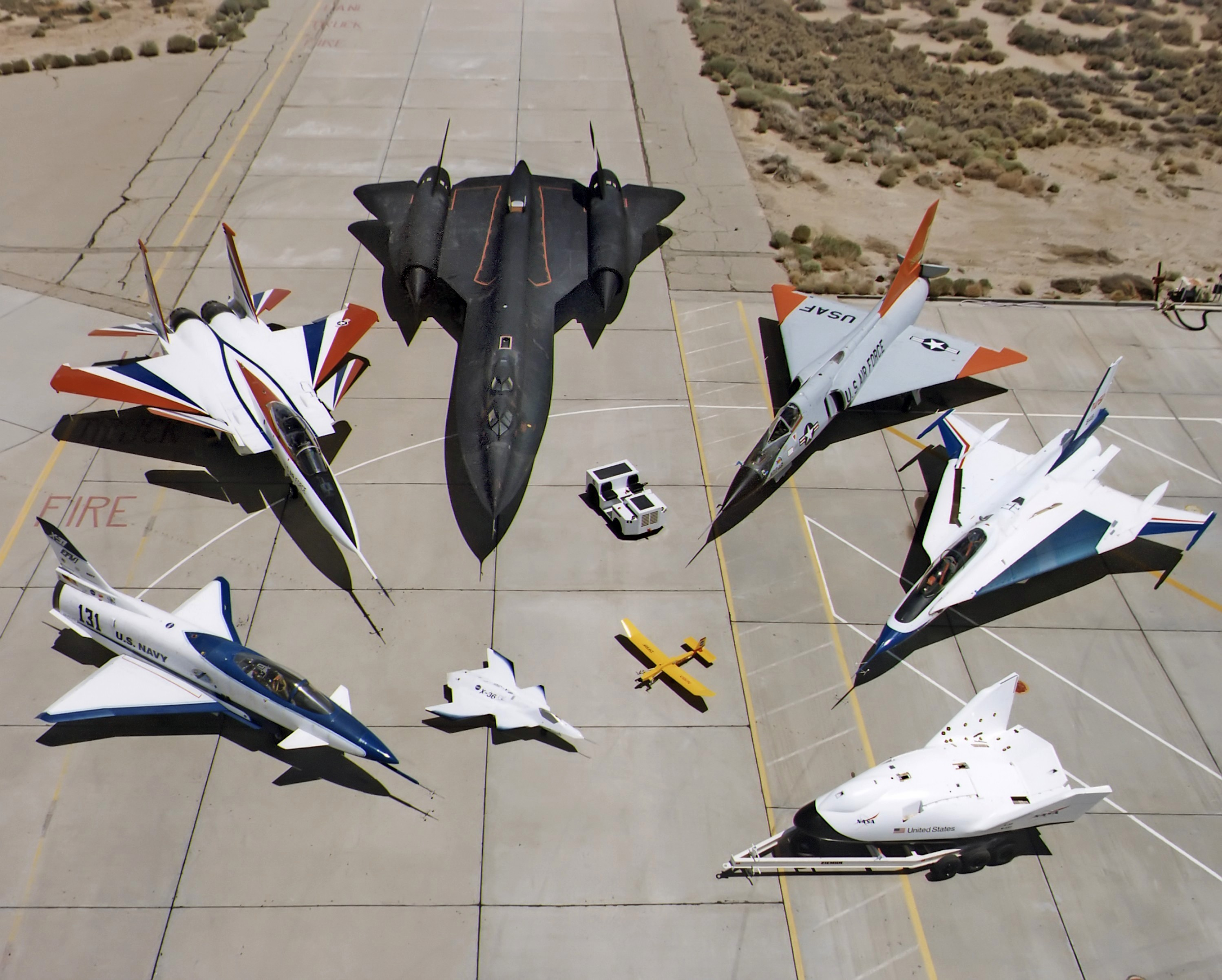
The Dryden Flight Research Center's fleet of aircraft in 1997

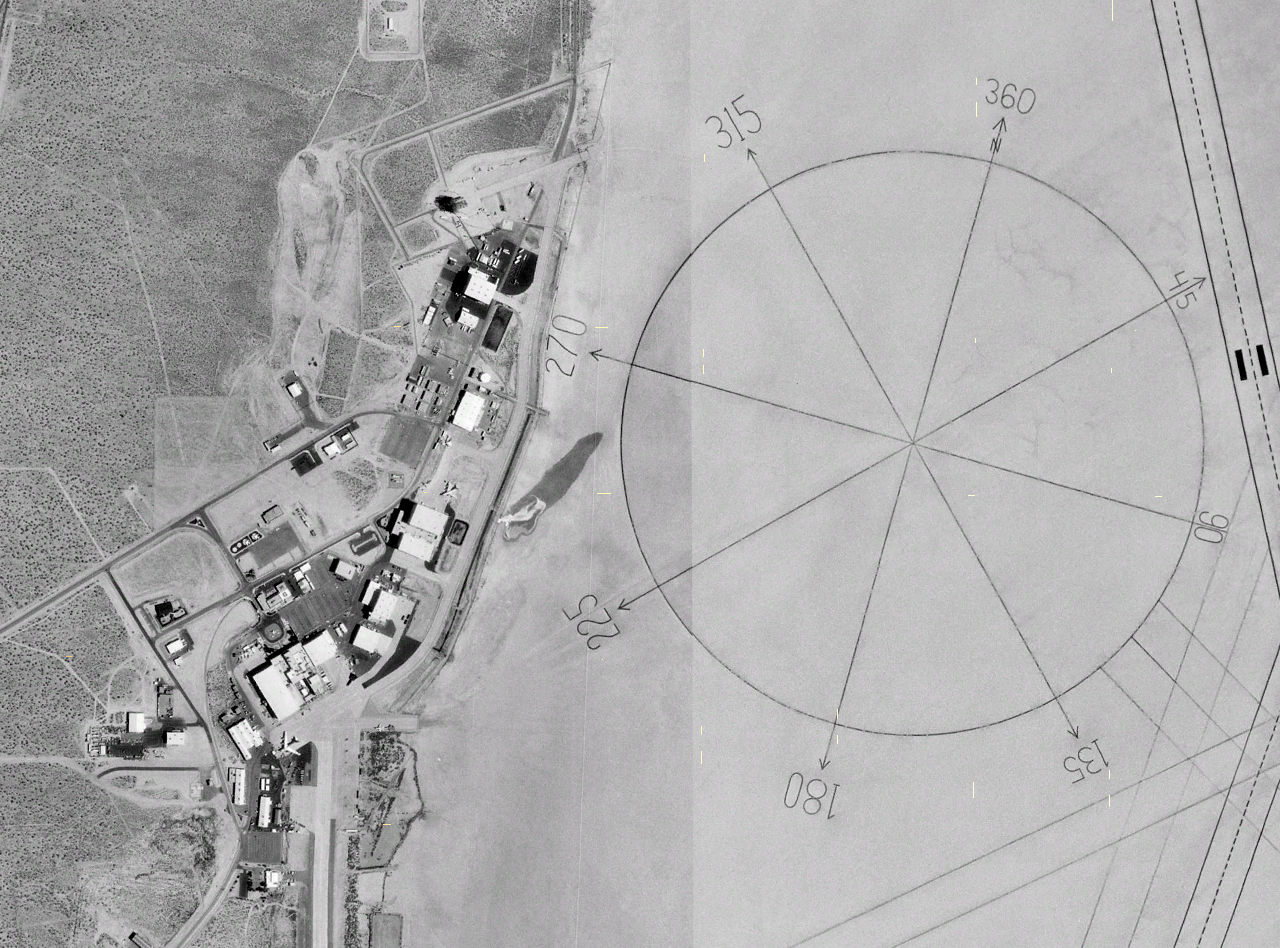
The satellite image of Armstrong Flight Research Center and the Edwards compass rose

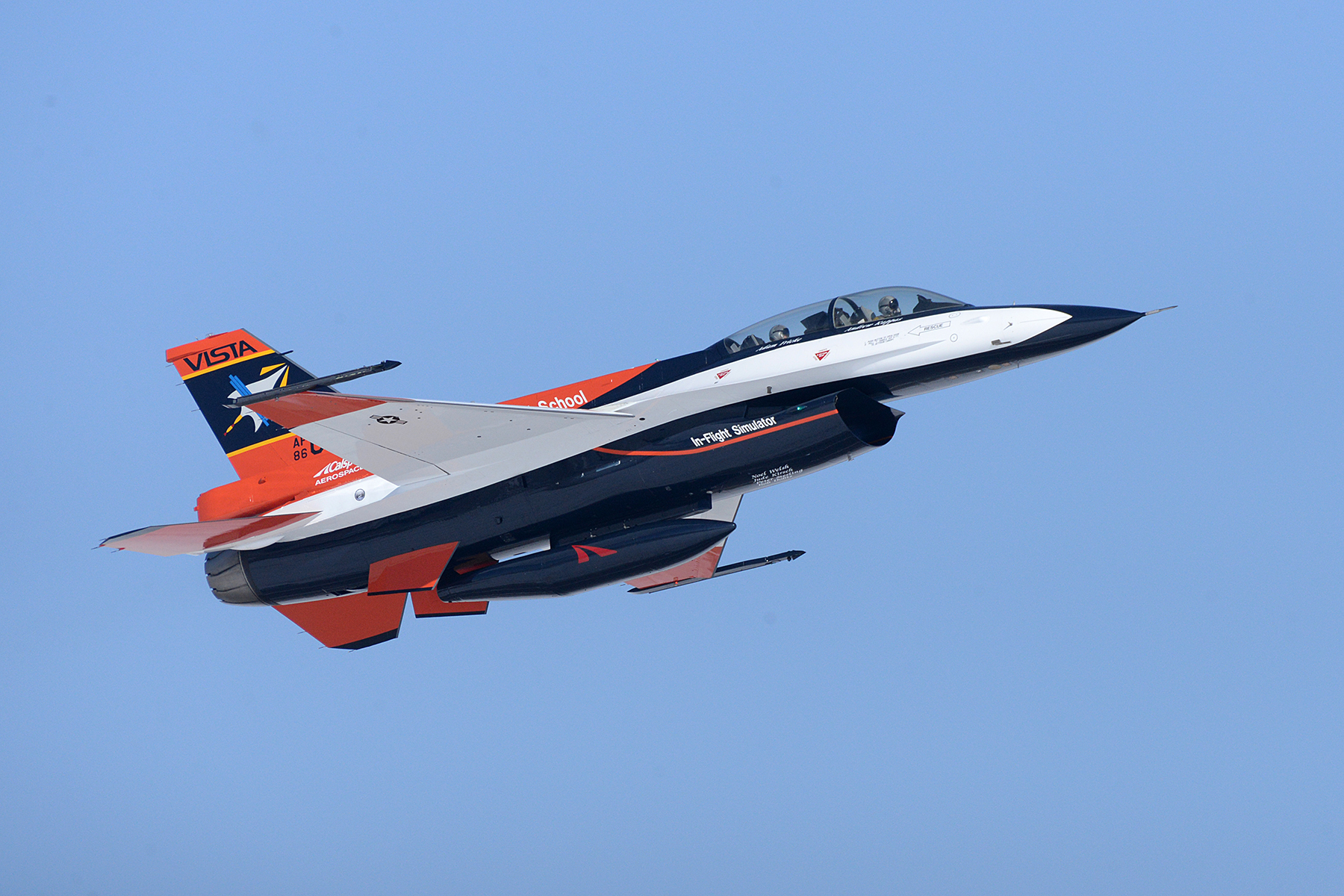
F-16-based VISTA multifunctional testbed aircraft (former NF-16D and now X-62A) in 2019 under a new paint scheme

== List of center directors ==
The following persons have served as the Armstrong Flight Research Center director:

No.	Image	Director	Start	End	Notes
1		Walter C. Williams	September 30, 1946	Fall 1949	Supervisor, NACA Muroc Flight Test Unit
1		Walter C. Williams	Fall 1949	July 1, 1954	Supervisor, NACA High Speed Flight Research Station
1		Walter C. Williams	July 1, 1954	September 15, 1959	Director, NACA High Speed Flight Station
2		Paul F. Bikle	September 15, 1959	May 31, 1971	
Acting		De E. Beeler	June 1, 1971	October 11, 1971	
3		Lee R. Scherer	October 11, 1971	January 19, 1975	
4		David R. Scott	April 18, 1975	October 30, 1977	
Acting		Isaac T. Gillam	October 30, 1977	June 18, 1978	
5		Isaac T. Gillam	June 18, 1978	October 1, 1981	
6		John A. Manke	October 1, 1981	April 27, 1984	Director of Flight Operations
7		Martin Knutson	May 1984	December 2, 1990	Director of Flight Operations and Site Director
8		Kenneth J. Szalai	December 3, 1990	March 1, 1994	Facility Director
8		Kenneth J. Szalai	March 1, 1994	July 31, 1998	
Acting		Kevin L. Petersen	August 1, 1998	February 7, 1999	
9		Kevin L. Petersen	February 8, 1999	April 3, 2009	
Acting		David D. McBride	April 4, 2009	January 3, 2010	
10		David D. McBride	January 4, 2010	December 4, 2022	
11		Bradley Flick	December 5, 2022	March 19, 2026	
Acting		Troy Asher	March 19, 2026	October 28, 2026	
12		Troy Asher	October 29, 2026	incumbent	

== Notable employees ==
- Neil Armstrong
- Marta Bohn-Meyer
- Bill Dana
- C. Gordon Fullerton
- David Hedgley
- Bruce Peterson
- R. Dale Reed
- David Scott
- Milt Thompson
- Jeffrey S. Howell
- Kenneth W. Iliff
- Cameron J. Hartsfield

== See also ==
- Gromov Flight Research Institute - the Russia counterpart of the Armstrong Flight Research Centre
- List of aerospace flight test centres
