= Airstair =

Set of steps built into an aircraft

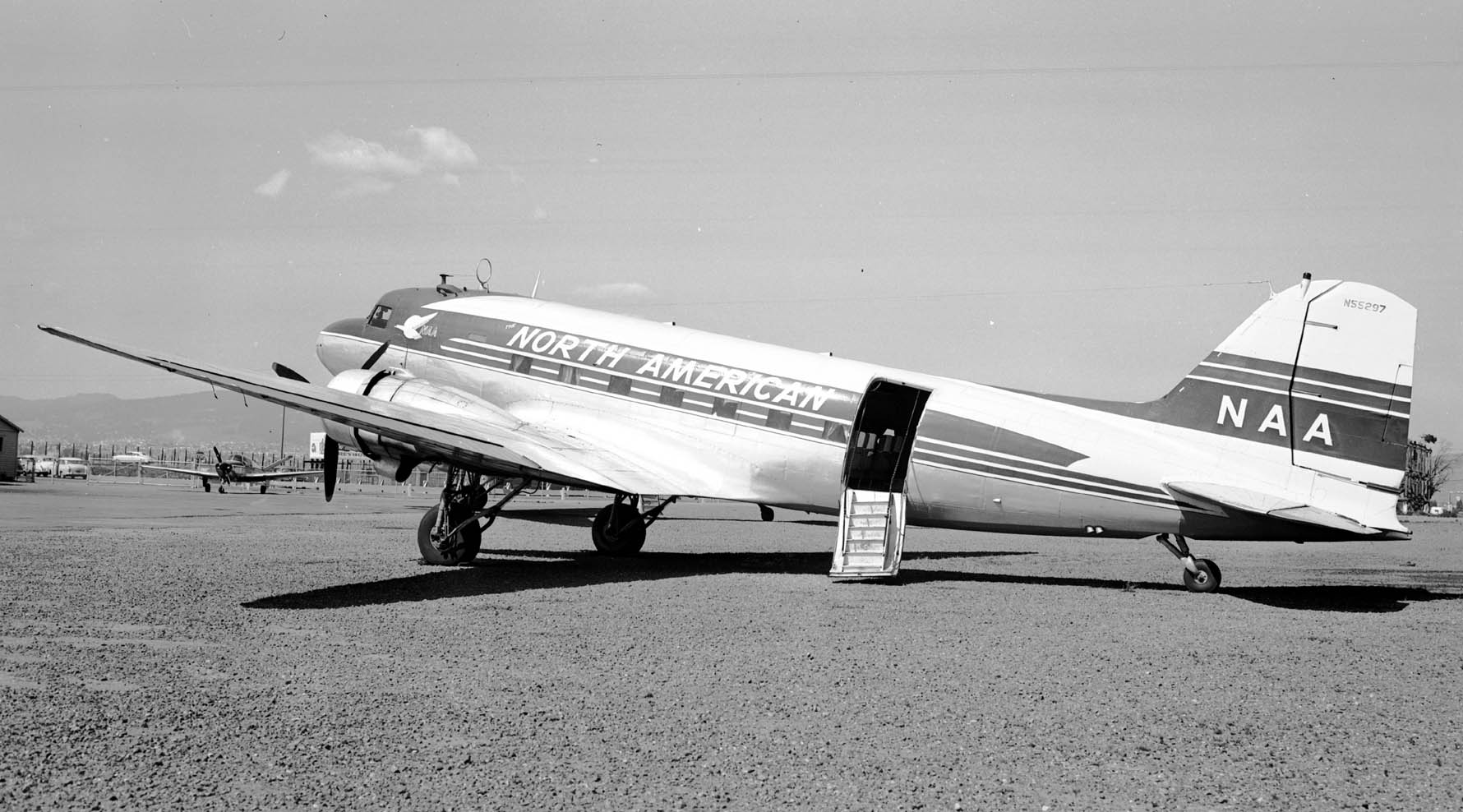
DC-3 modified with a simple airstair

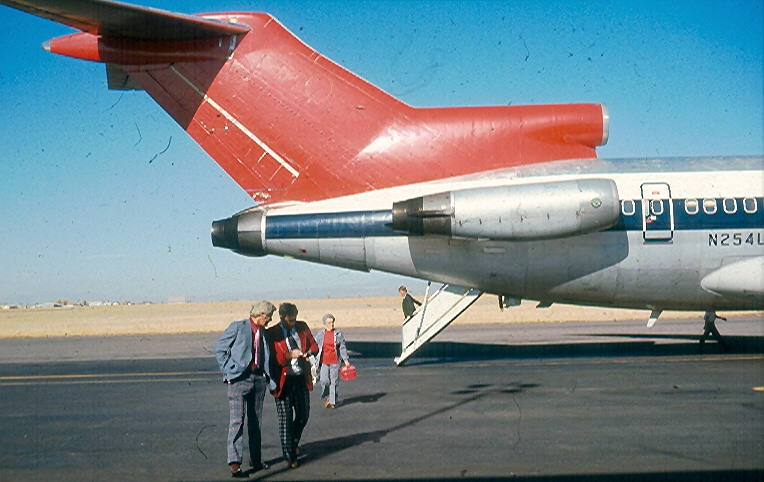
Northwest Airlines Boeing 727 with ventral airstair open

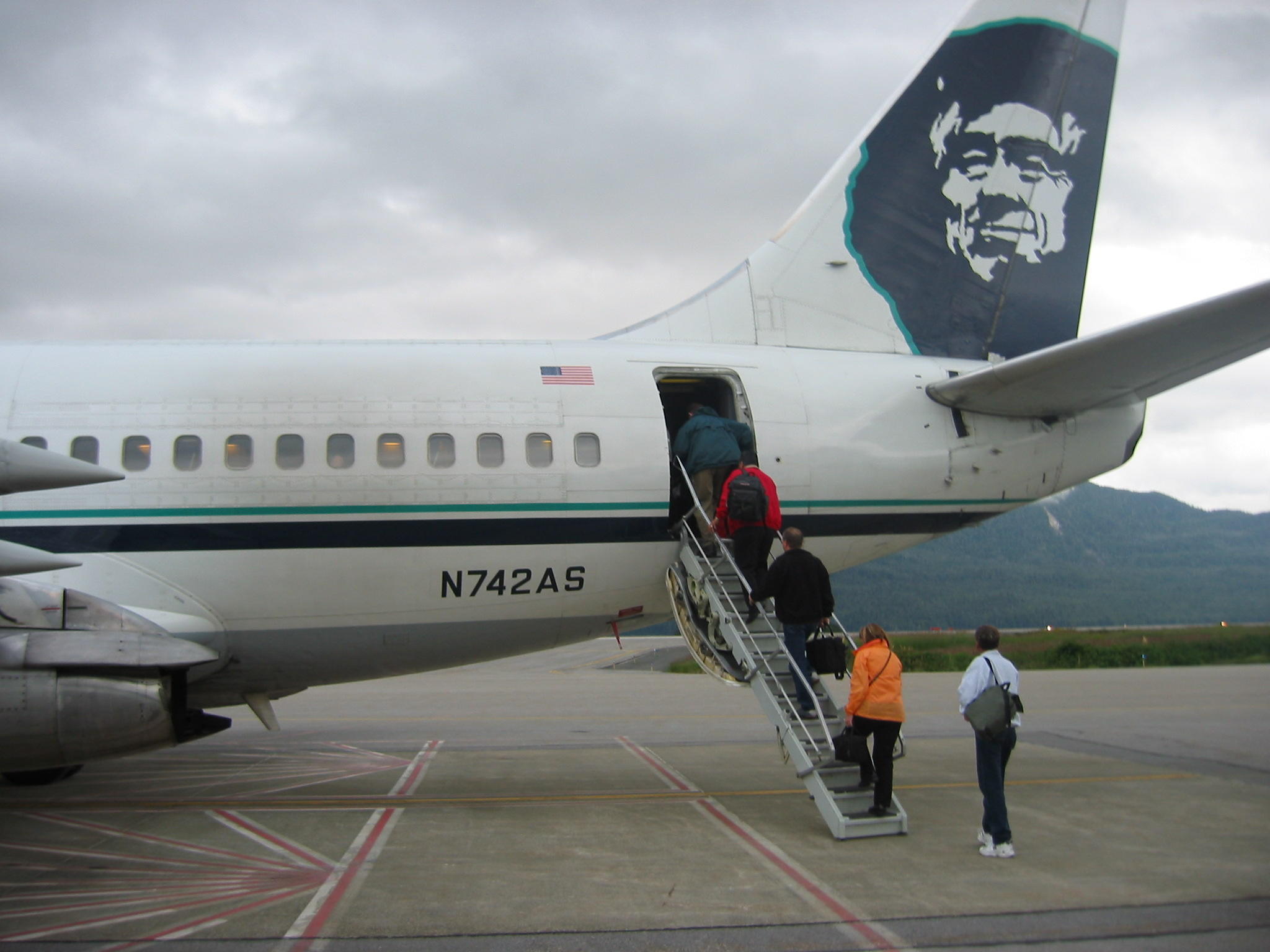
3-section folding airstair on a "Combi" 737-200 aircraft of Alaska Airlines

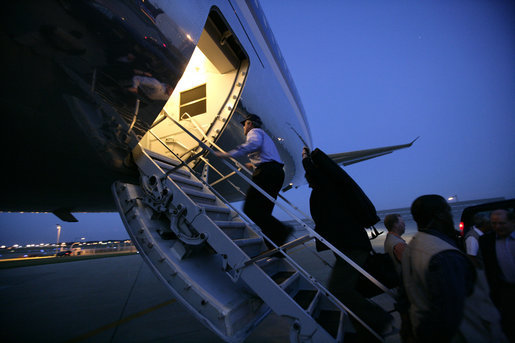
George W. Bush boards a VC-25 using the lower-level airstair.

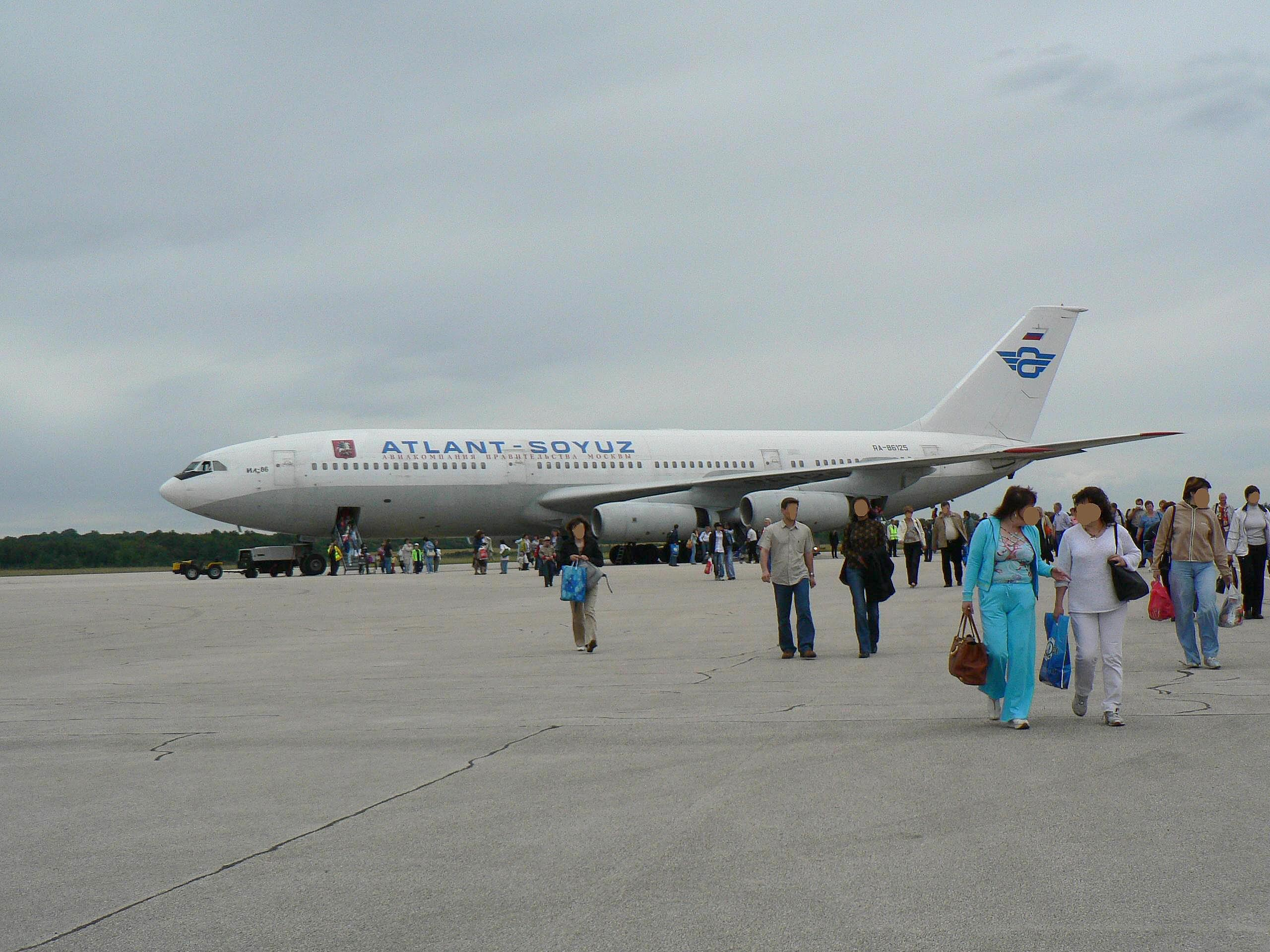
The Il-86, a wide-body airliner with airstairs into the lower cargo level. The rear airstair is also visible in this picture.

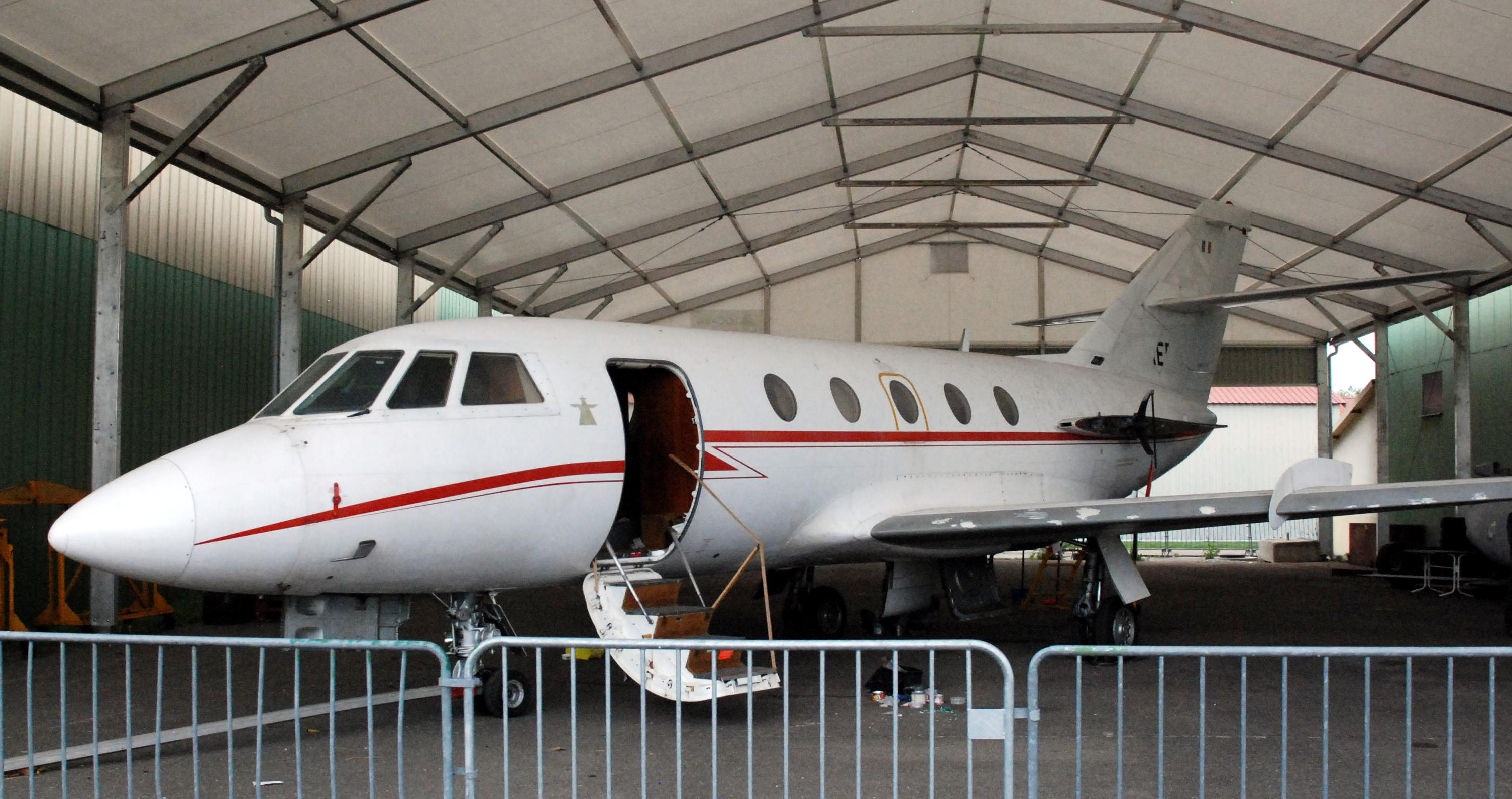
The airstair on a business jet

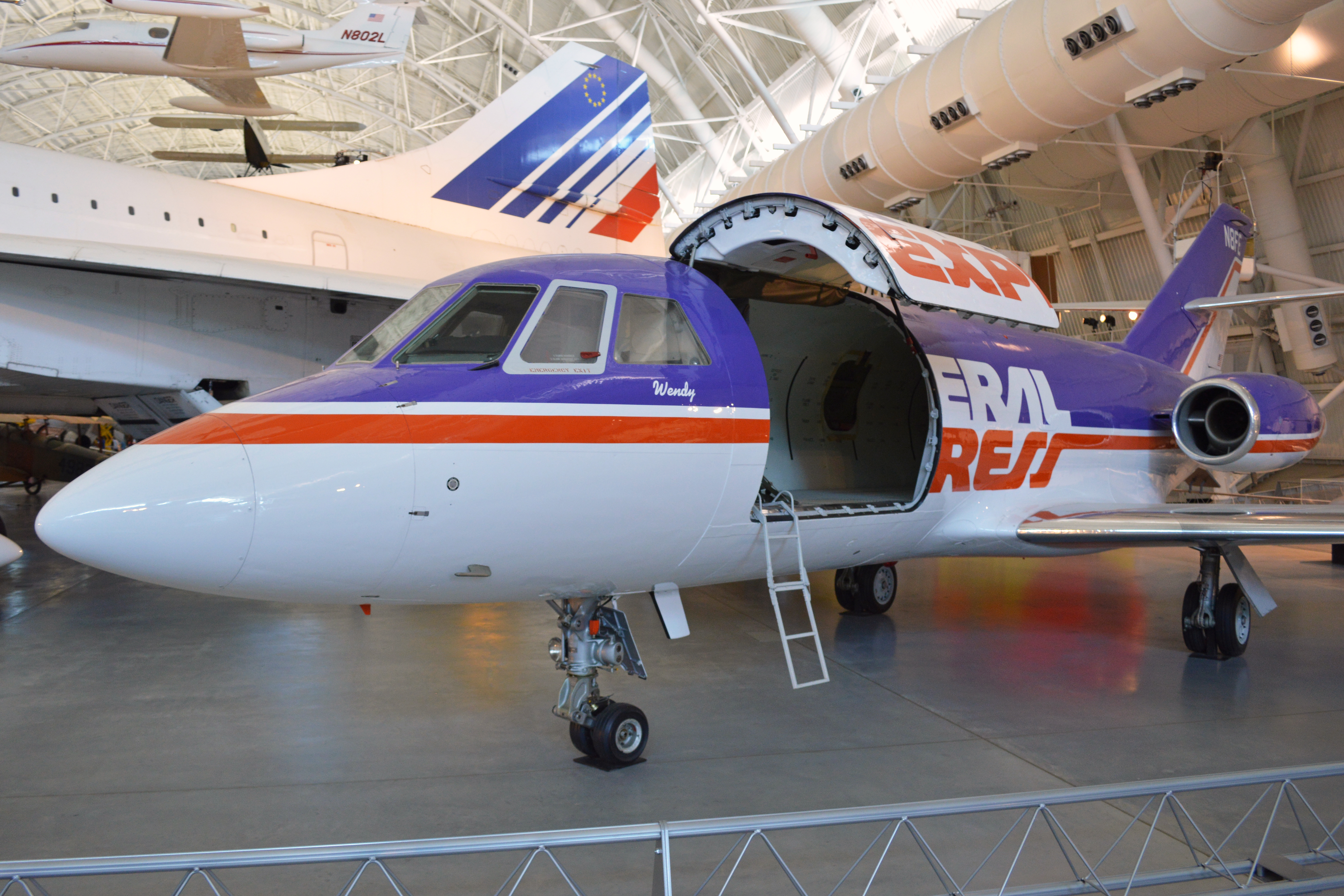
There were no passengers to accommodate on this business jet conversion for cargo operations. A manually-placed, folding airstair saved weight for crew access to the cockpit.

An airstair is a set of steps built into an aircraft so that passengers and crew can get on and off without needing help from outside. The stairs are built as part of a door or are lowered from inside after a door has been opened. Airstairs remove the need for a mobile stairway or jetway to get in and out of an aircraft. Some of the earliest aircraft with airstairs were the Martin 2-0-2 and Martin 4-0-4. Some Douglas DC-3 aircraft were retrofitted with airstairs. As the infrastructure of airports developed, the need for airstairs decreased.

The cabin doors on wide-body aircraft are significantly higher above the ground than on narrow-body aircraft. When airstairs have been a requirement, as on the VC-25 and the Ilyushin Il-86, the airstairs go into the lower level cargo hold, with steps inside to get to the cabin.

Some aircraft, like the Boeing 727 and McDonnell Douglas DC-9, were designed to improve ground services, with passengers deplaning from the front as the aircraft is serviced from the rear, enabling quicker turnarounds.

Airstairs are also used as a security measure, for example on aircraft carrying the president of the United States, allowing the aircraft to be boarded by VIPs at any time – with or without the cooperation of ground services.

== Design ==
Ventral airstairs have been used on rear-engined airliners, such as the Boeing 727, the McDonnell Douglas DC-9, MD-80 and MD-90, the BAC 1-11, the Sud Aviation Caravelle and the Yakovlev Yak-40/Yak-42 series, and are incorporated as ramps which lower from the fuselage. The Ilyushin Il-86 has three airstairs on the port side.

The most common type of airstair is found on most business aircraft, regional jets, and other small airliners. Steps are built on the inside of the passenger door, which is hinged at its lower edge to make a stairway from the ground. Because the aircraft which use it sit low to the ground, it is simple and relatively light. This type has also been used with a single-length stair extension to the cargo compartment of the widebody Ilyushin Il-86 (the primary entrance to the aircraft for passengers), Boeing VC-25, and the belly lounges of three Lockheed L-1011s.

Another widespread type of airstair is used for forward doors. The stair folds and stows under the floor of the door and is deployed from the fuselage immediately below the forward door. This type of airstair is found on many short-range aircraft such as Boeing 737s, DC-9s, and some Airbus A320 series aircraft. The mechanism is also quite heavy; as a result, many airlines have removed this system to reduce aircraft weight.

A unique airstair design was used for the aft doors of 737 Combi aircraft, which consisted of a clamshell door which dropped down to open much like a business aircraft, but then had stairs which were stored trifold in the curve of the door, which would unfold to the ground. This system was very cumbersome, was very susceptible to damage, and thus has been removed by many of its users.

The most unusual airstair design was found on the Lockheed L-1011, which was a full-height airstair that was stored in a cargo compartment and allowed access from the right aft passenger door to the ground. This design was ultimately so large and heavy, and it took up valuable cargo space, that it was rarely used. One version of on-board folding airstairs were designed by Winters Aircraft Engineering Company over 30 years ago. Dow Aero is the current STC holder, as listed on the FAA's Dynamic Regulatory System. Dow Aero acquired the STC’s for the Boeing 727, 737, 747,757, 767, and L-1011 from Airweld Incorporated.

STC's have been previously issued to subsequent manufacturers including Kaiser Aerospace, WAPCO, and Advanced Aerospace. On-Board Folding Airstairs can be found in use on many U.S., Foreign Military, and Government Aircraft, including the Boeing E4B as well as VIP aircraft around the world. The On-Board Folding Airstairs is a multi-section (3, 4, or 5 segment) airstair that can be installed at either the forward, center, or aft doors. When retracted/closed, the airstair sits on a track and is typically stowed in a closet either Forward, Aft, or Transverse.

== As a parachuting exit ==
An animation representing D. B. Cooper parachuting from the rear airstair with his $200,000 ransom. He jumped off of the Northwest Orient Airlines Flight 305 operated by the Boeing 727 he hijacked (Click to view animation)

A rear, ventral, airstair can be used as a safe means of parachuting from an airliner that is equipped with one. This was attempted on 24 November 1971 by an unknown hijacker, widely known as D. B. Cooper, who jumped from a Boeing 727 along with US$200,000 in ransom money. However, it is unknown if he survived the jump. Subsequently, a number of individuals carried out copycat hijackings against Boeing 727s and safely parachuted to the ground, although all were apprehended by the authorities. To prevent this, Boeing 727s were ordered to be fitted with a simple device known as a Cooper vane that prevented the ventral airstair from being opened in flight.

The rear airstair of a DC-9 has been used to allow for recreational skydiving operations.

During the 2012 Boeing 727 crash experiment, a flight crew took off in the Boeing 727 that was to be crashed and flew it to a pre-selected desert site before safely parachuting from the airstair, as the Mexican government required that the plane be flown by a human crew for part of the experiment, especially as the aircraft's route to the crash site passed over populated areas. The 727 was then deliberately flown into the ground under remote control.

== See also ==
- Jet bridge
- Evacuation slide
