= Controlled Impact Demonstration =

1984 crash test of a Boeing 720

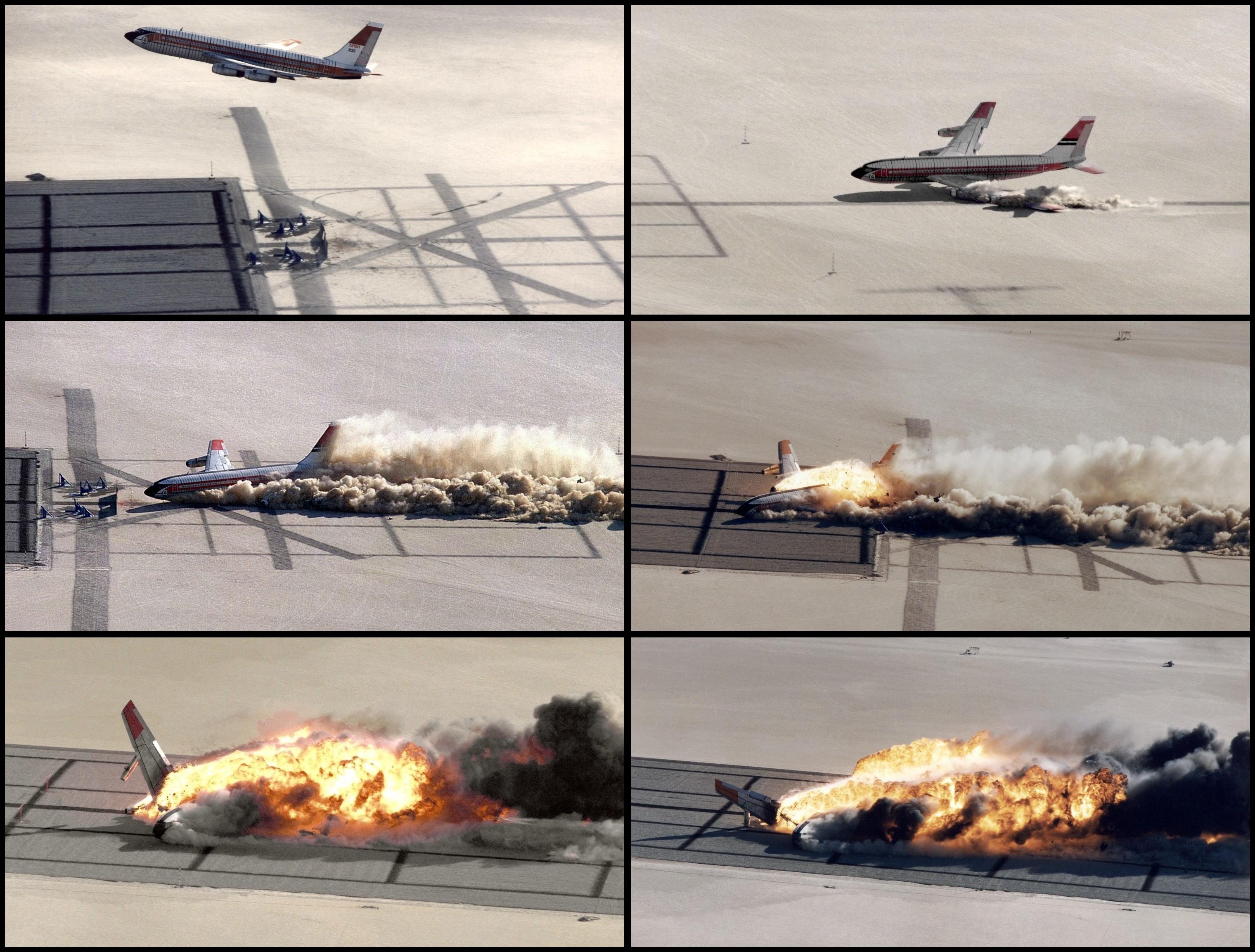
- The controlled impact demonstration

Crash experiment
- Date: December 1, 1984
- Summary: Remote controlled deliberate crash into terrain / CFIT
- Site: Rogers Dry Lake; 34°53′13″N 117°49′12″W

Aircraft
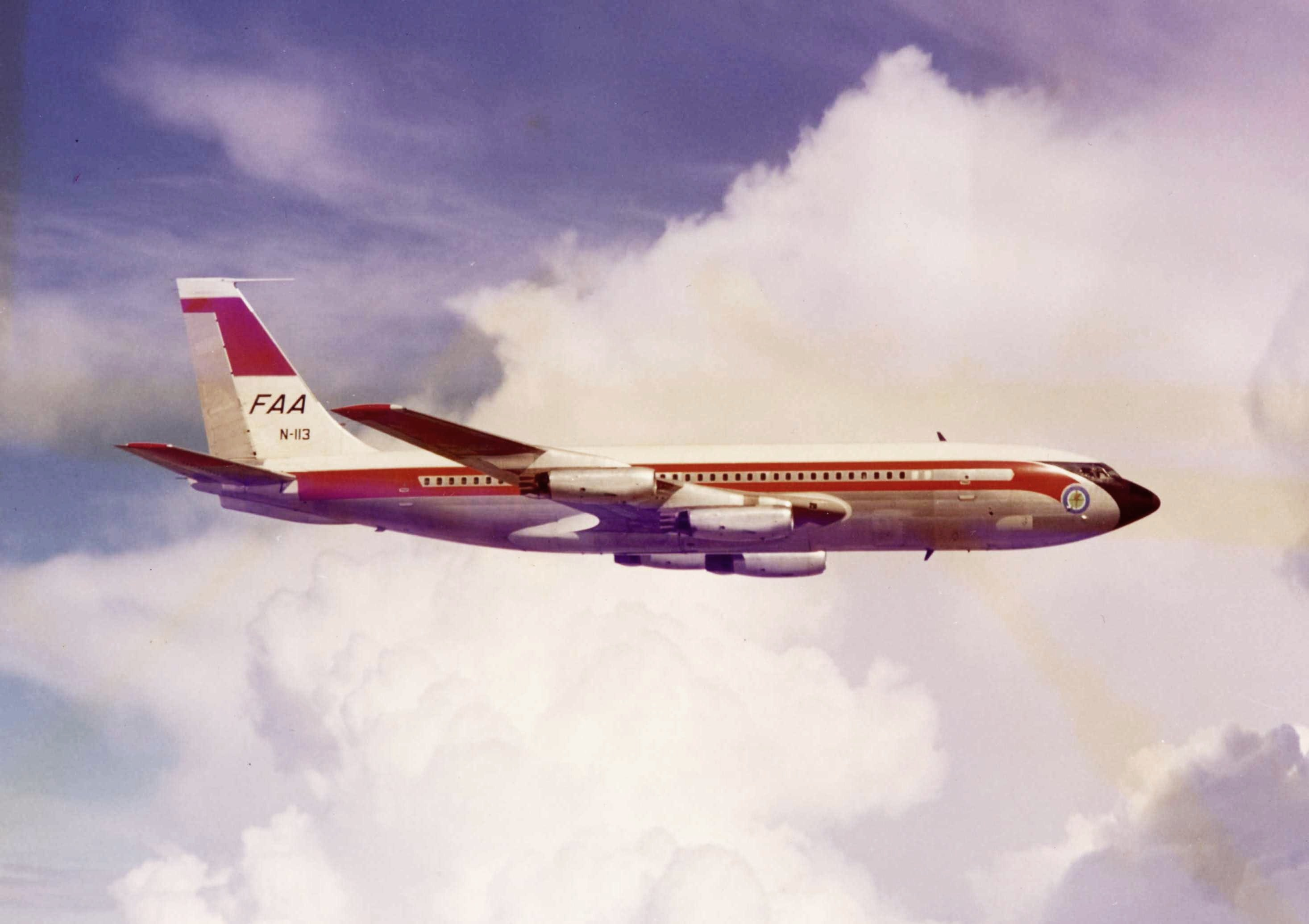
- N833NA, the Boeing 720 aircraft involved in the test
- Aircraft type: Boeing 720
- Operator: FAA & NASA
- Registration: N833NA
- Flight origin: Edwards Air Force Base
- Occupants: 0
- Passengers: 0
- Crew: 0

The Controlled Impact Demonstration (or colloquially the Crash In the Desert) was a joint project between NASA and the Federal Aviation Administration (FAA) that intentionally crashed a remotely controlled Boeing 720 aircraft to acquire data and test new technologies to aid passenger and crew survival. The crash required more than four years of preparation by NASA Ames Research Center, Langley Research Center, Dryden Flight Research Center, the FAA, and General Electric. After numerous test runs, the plane was crashed on December 1, 1984. The test went generally according to plan, and produced a large fireball that required more than an hour to extinguish.

The FAA concluded that about one-quarter of the passengers would have survived, that the antimisting kerosene test fuel did not sufficiently reduce the risk of fire, and that several changes to equipment in the passenger compartment of aircraft were needed. NASA concluded that a head-up display and microwave landing system would have helped the pilot more safely fly the aircraft.

== Background and experiment setup ==
NASA and the Federal Aviation Administration (FAA) conducted a joint program for the acquisition, demonstration, and validation of technology for the improvement of transport aircraft occupant crash survivability using a large, four-engine, remotely piloted transport airplane in a controlled impact demonstration (CID). The CID program was conducted at the Dryden Flight Research Facility of NASA Ames Research Center (Ames-Dryden), at Edwards, California, using a remotely controlled Boeing 720 transport, and was completed in late 1984. The objectives of the CID program were to demonstrate a reduction of postcrash fire through the use of antimisting fuel, acquire transport crash structural data, and to demonstrate the effectiveness of existing improved seat-restraint and cabin structural systems.

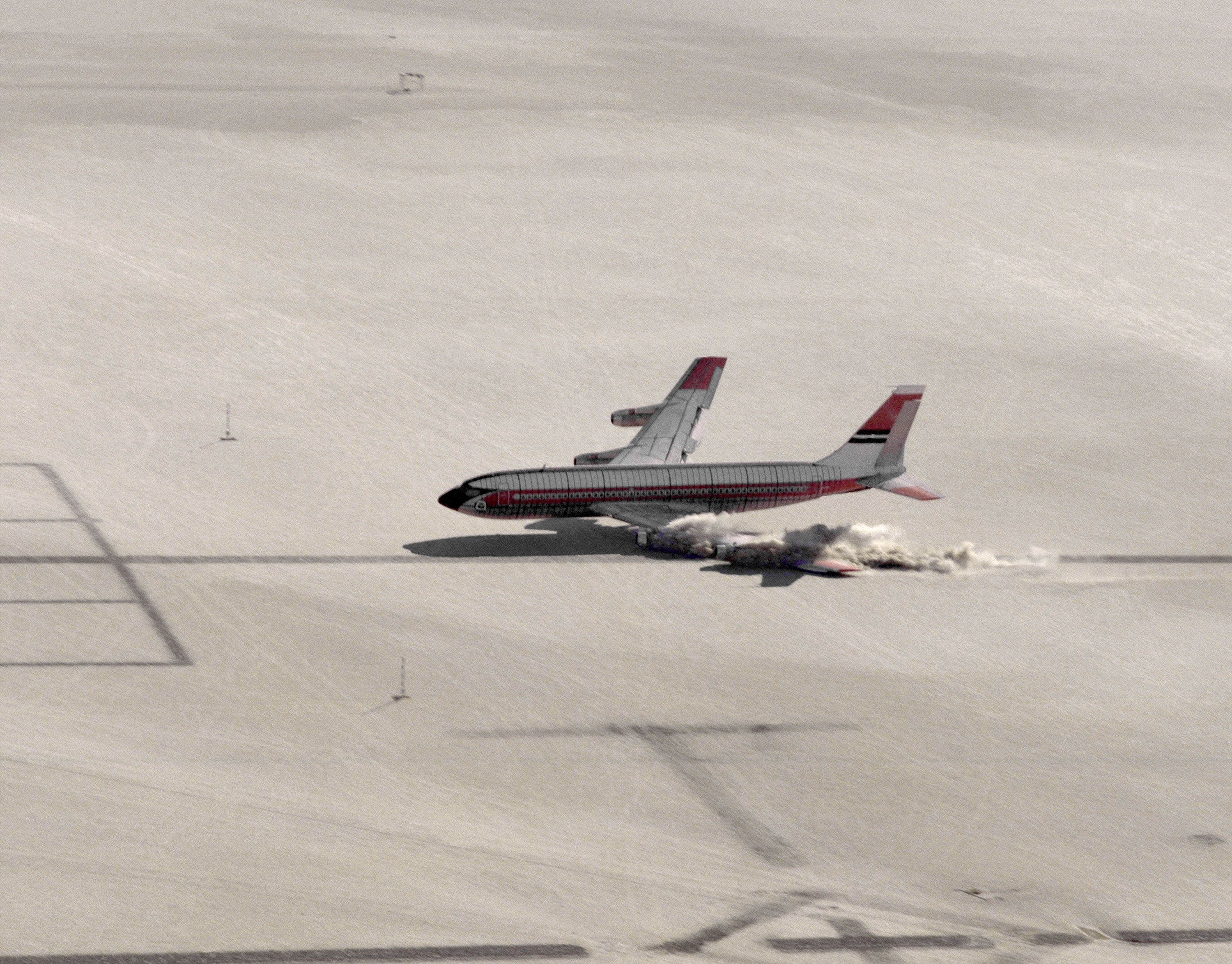
Slapdown

The Boeing 720 (tail number N833NA) was purchased new by the FAA in 1960 as a training aircraft. After more than 20,000 hours and 54,000 takeoff and landing cycles, it had come to the end of its useful life. The aircraft was turned over to NASA-Ames/Dryden Flight Research Center for the CID program in 1981.

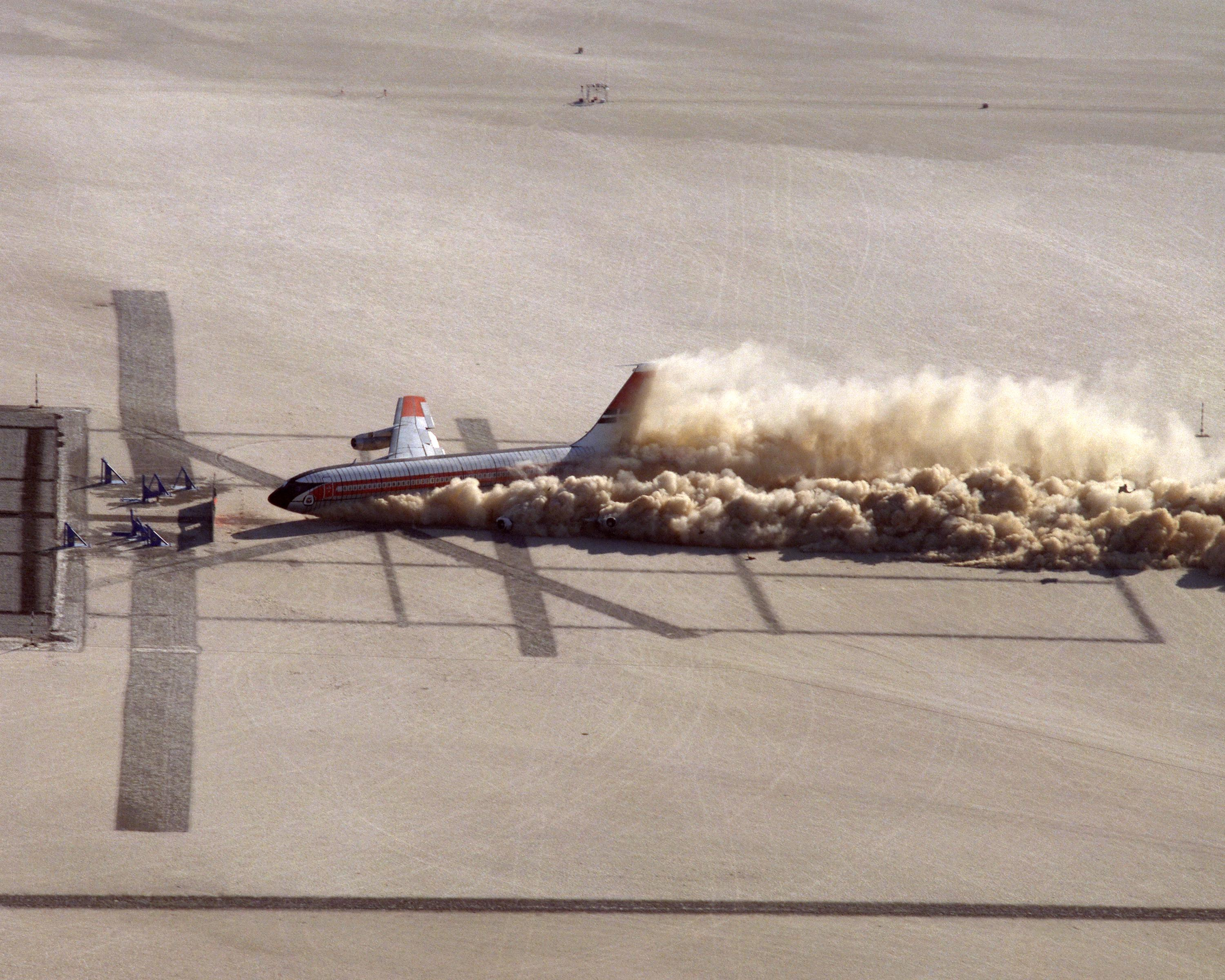
Before impact

The additive, ICI's FM-9, a high molecular-weight long chain polymer, when blended with Jet-A fuel, forms antimisting kerosene (AMK). AMK had demonstrated the capability to inhibit ignition and flame propagation of the released fuel in simulated impact tests. AMK cannot be introduced directly into a gas turbine engine due to several possible problems such as clogging of filters. The AMK must be restored to almost Jet-A before being introduced into the engine for burning. This restoration is called degradation and was accomplished on the Boeing 720 using a device called a degrader. Each of the four Pratt & Whitney JT3C-7 engines had a degrader built and installed by General Electric (GE) to break down and return the AMK to near Jet-A quality.

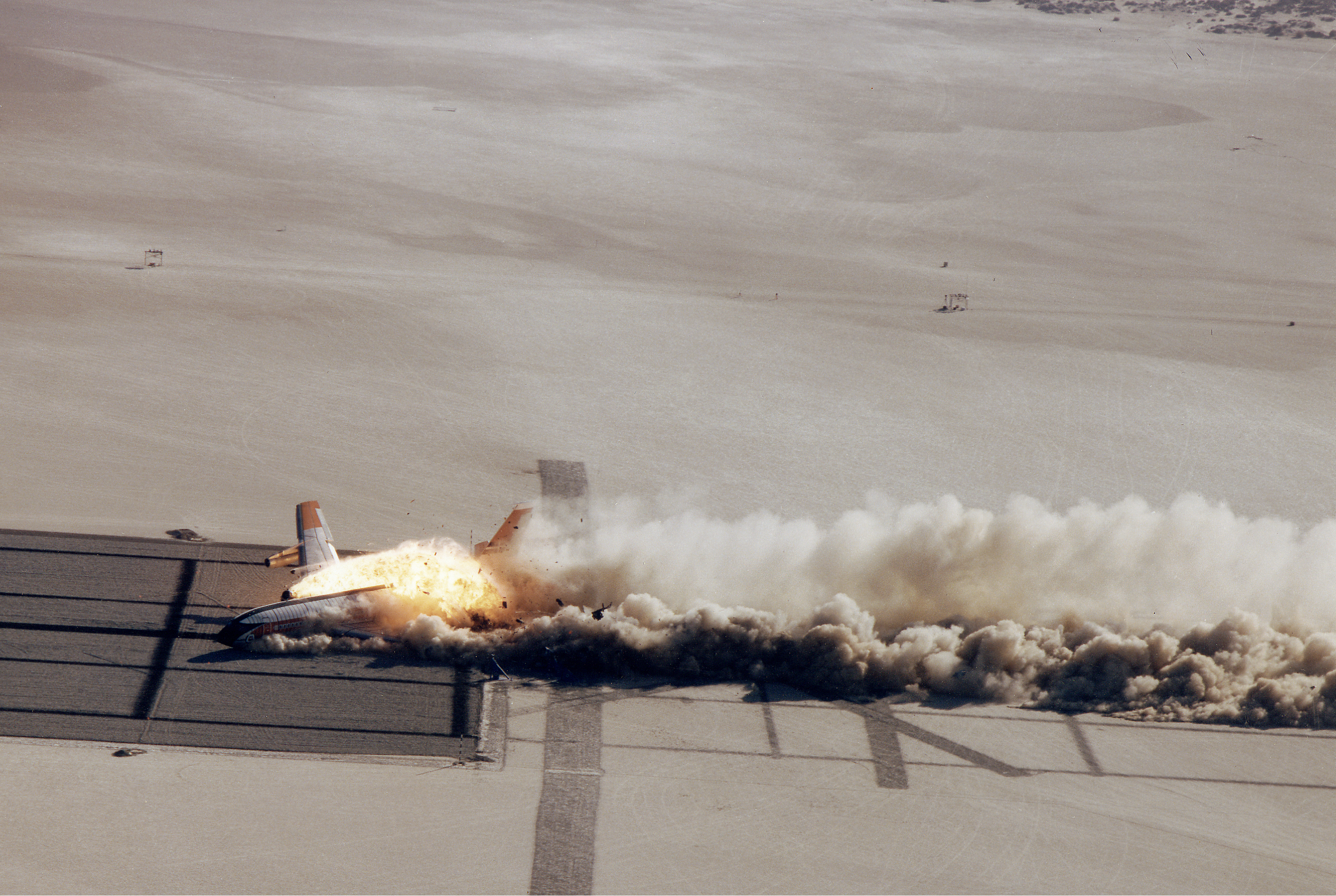
After impact 1

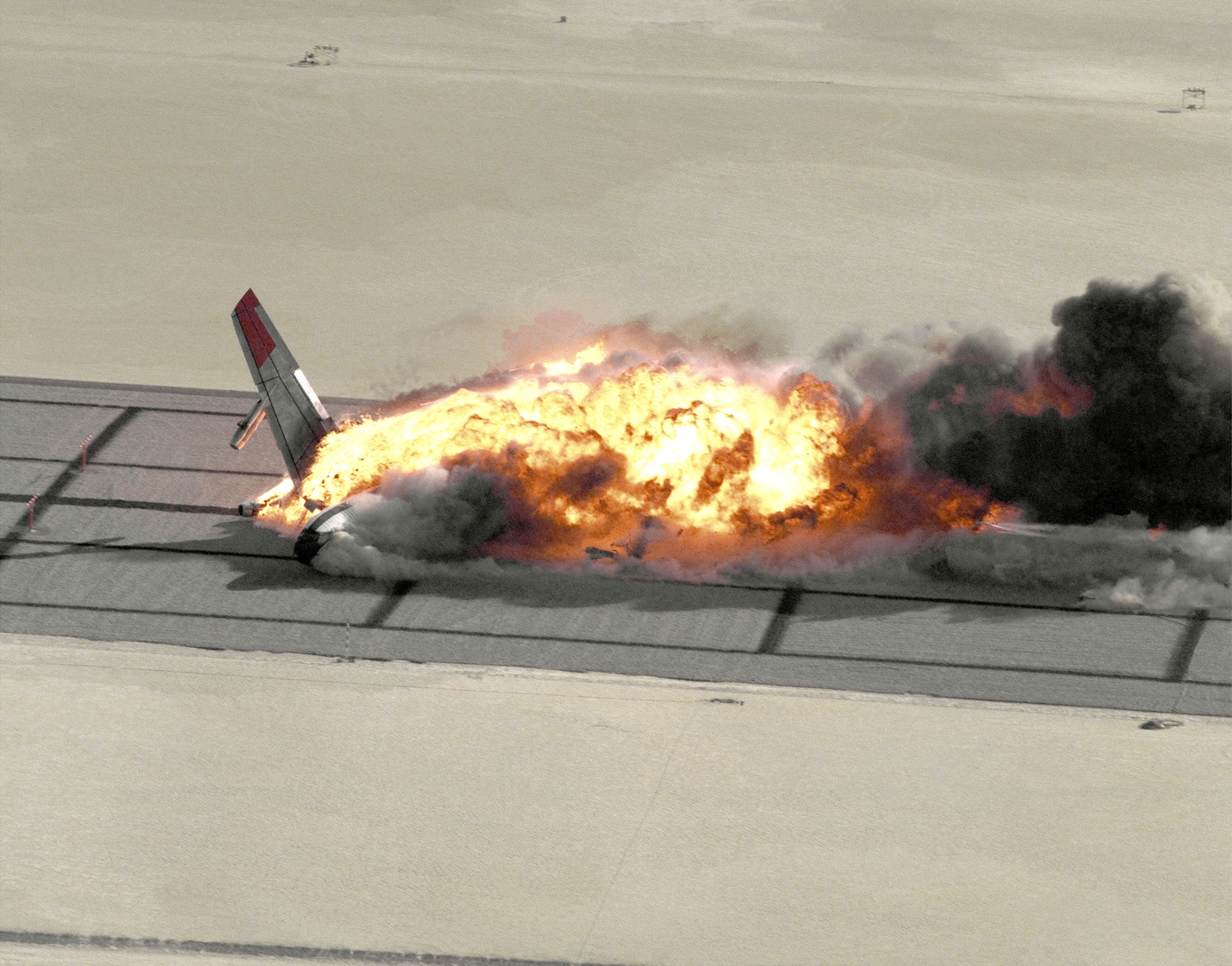
After impact 2

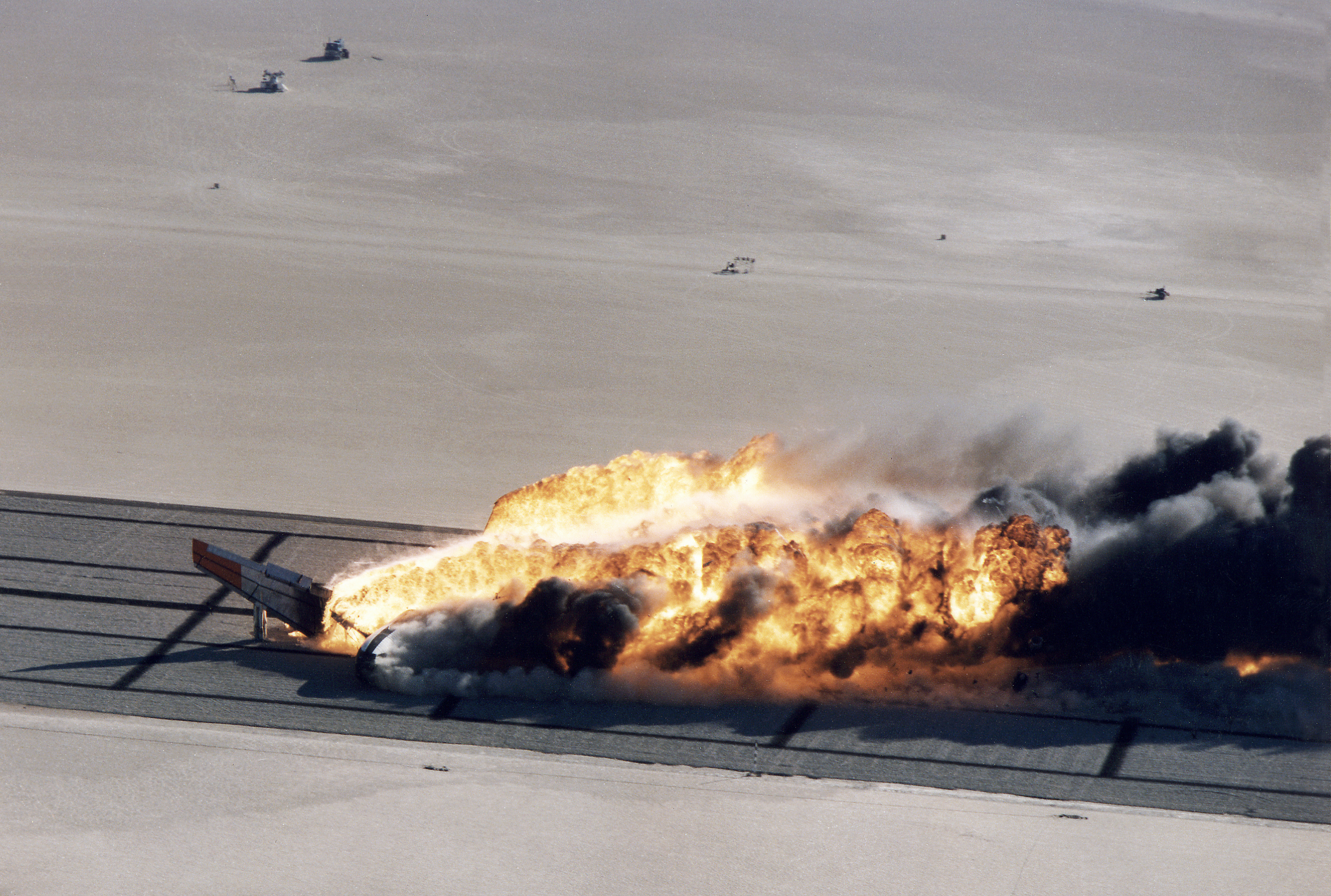
After impact 3

In addition to the AMK research, NASA Langley Research Center was involved in a structural load measurement experiment, which included using instrumented crash dummies in the seats of the passenger compartment and cockpit. Before the final flight in 1984, more than four years of effort was expended in attempting to establish final impact conditions which would be considered to be survivable by the FAA.

Over a series of 14 flights, General Electric installed and tested four degraders (one on each engine); the FAA refined AMK, blending, testing, and fueling a full size aircraft. During the flights the aircraft made approximately 69 approaches, to about 150 feet (46 m) above the prepared crash site, under remote control. These flights were used to introduce AMK one step at a time into some of the fuel tanks and engines while monitoring the performance of the engines. During those same flights, NASA's Dryden Flight Research Center also developed the remote piloting techniques necessary for the Boeing 720 to fly as a drone aircraft. An initial attempt at the full-scale test was scrubbed in late 1983 due to problems with the uplink connection to the 720; if the uplink failed the ground-based pilot would no longer have control of the aircraft.

== Test execution ==
On the morning of December 1, 1984, the test aircraft took off from Edwards Air Force Base, California, made a left-hand departure and climbed to an altitude of 2,300 feet (700 m). The aircraft was remotely flown by NASA research pilot Fitzhugh Fulton from the NASA Dryden Remotely Controlled Vehicle Facility. All fuel tanks were filled with a total of 76,000 pounds (34,000 kg) of AMK and all engines ran from start-up to impact (flight time was 9 minutes) on the modified Jet-A. It then began a descent-to-landing along the roughly 3.8-degree glideslope to a specially prepared runway on the east side of Rogers Dry Lake, with the landing gear remaining retracted.

Passing the decision height of 150 feet (46 m) above ground level (AGL), the aircraft turned slightly to the right of the desired path. The aircraft entered into a situation known as a Dutch roll. Slightly above that decision point at which the pilot was to execute a "go-around", there appeared to be enough altitude to maneuver back to the center-line of the runway. The aircraft was below the glideslope and below the desired airspeed. Data acquisition systems had been activated, and the aircraft was committed to impact.

The aircraft contacted the ground, left wing low, at full throttle, with the aircraft nose pointing to the left of the center-line. It had been planned that the aircraft would land wings-level, with the throttles set to idle, and exactly on the center-line during the CID, thus allowing the fuselage to remain intact as the wings were sliced open by eight posts cemented into the runway (called "Rhinos" due to the shape of the "horns" welded onto the posts). The Boeing 720 landed askew. One of the Rhinos sliced through the number 3 engine, behind the burner can, leaving the engine on the wing pylon, which does not typically happen in an impact of this type. The same rhino then sliced through the fuselage, causing a cabin fire when burning fuel was able to enter the fuselage.

The cutting of the number 3 engine and the full-throttle situation was significant, as this was outside the test envelope. The number 3 engine continued to operate for approximately 1/3 of a rotation, degrading the fuel and igniting it after impact, providing a significant heat source. The fire and smoke took over an hour to extinguish. The CID impact was spectacular with a large fireball created by the number 3 engine on the right side, enveloping and burning the aircraft. From the standpoint of AMK the test was a major setback. For NASA Langley, the data collected on crashworthiness was deemed successful and just as important.

== Findings ==
The actual impact demonstrated that the antimisting additive tested was not sufficient to prevent a post-crash fire in all circumstances, though the reduced intensity of the initial fire was attributed to the effect of AMK.

FAA investigators estimated that 23–25% of the aircraft's full complement of 113 people could have survived the crash. Time from slide-out to complete smoke obscuration for the forward cabin was 5 seconds; for the aft cabin, it was 20 seconds. Total time to evacuate was 15 and 33 seconds respectively, accounting for the time necessary to reach and open the doors and operate the slide. Investigators labeled their estimate of the ability to escape through dense smoke as "highly speculative".

As a result of analysis of the crash, the FAA instituted new flammability standards for seat cushions which required the use of fire-blocking layers, resulting in seats which performed better than those in the test. It also implemented a standard requiring floor proximity lighting to be mechanically fastened, due to the apparent detachment of two types of adhesive-fastened emergency lights during the impact. Federal aviation regulations for flight data recorder sampling rates for pitch, roll and acceleration were found to be insufficient.

NASA concluded that the impact piloting task was of an unusually high workload, which might have been reduced through the use of a heads-up display, the automation of more tasks, and a higher-resolution monitor. It also recommended the use of a microwave landing system to improve tracking accuracy over the standard instrument landing system. In practice, the Global Positioning System-based Wide Area Augmentation System came to fulfill this role.

Additional photos and videos

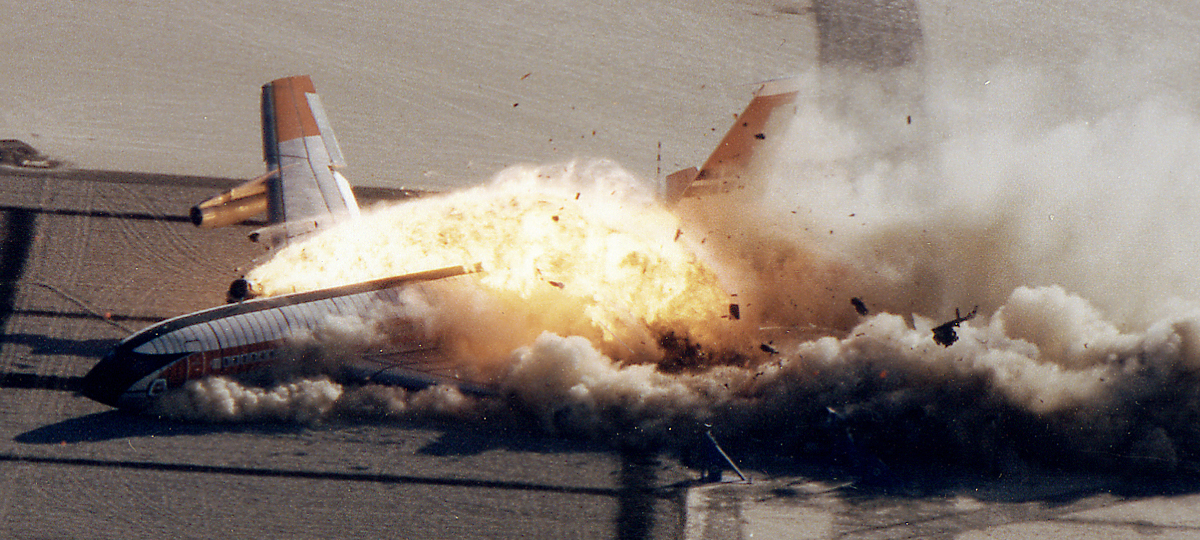
Closeup of After impact 1

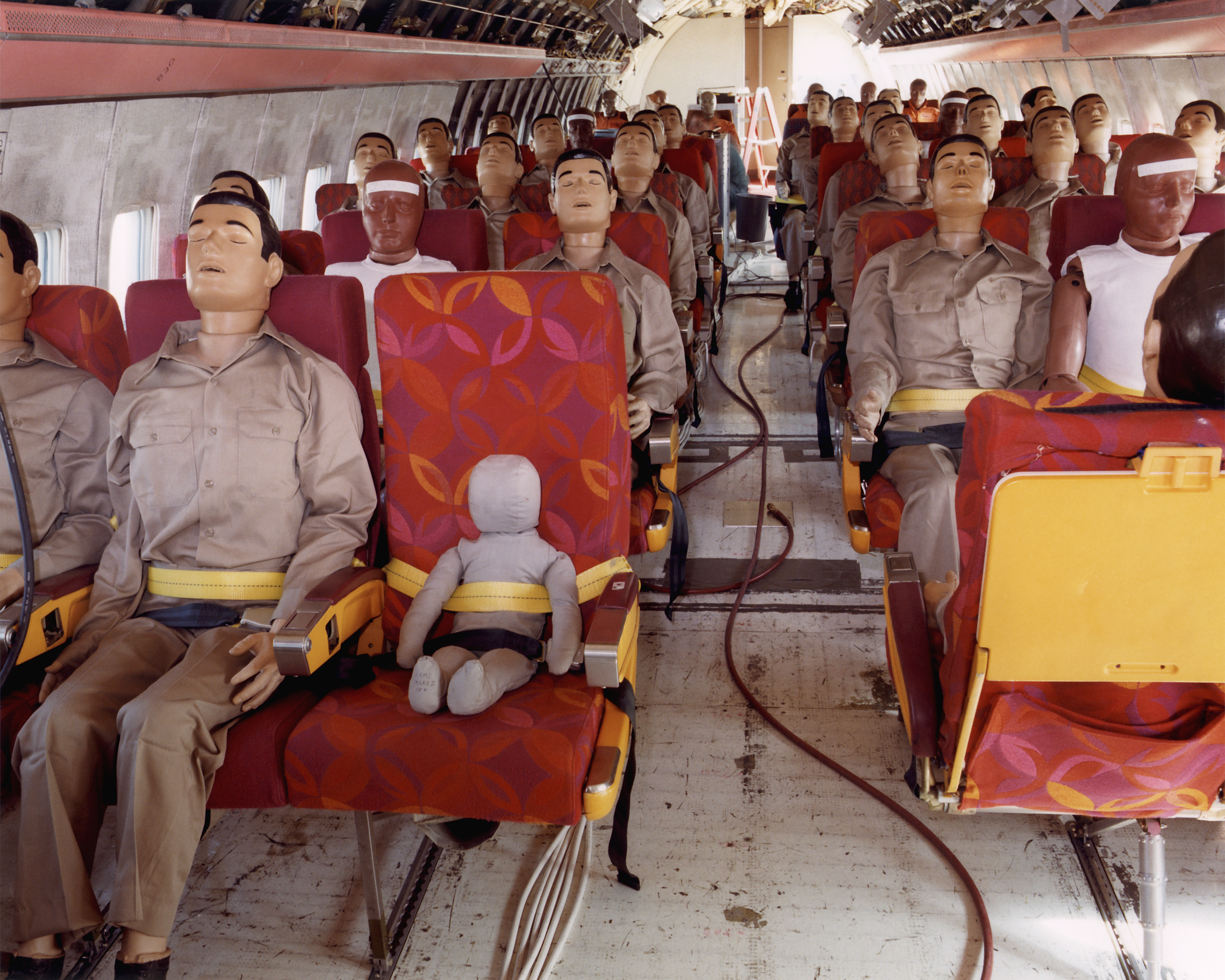
Instrumented crash dummies

Controlled Impact Demonstration (CID) sequence

CID Aircraft in practice flight above target impact site with wing cutters

Controlled Impact Demonstration (CID) tail camera video

== See also ==
- 2012 Boeing 727 crash experiment
