= Robert A. Rushworth =

United States Air Force X-15 pilot and major general (1924–1993)

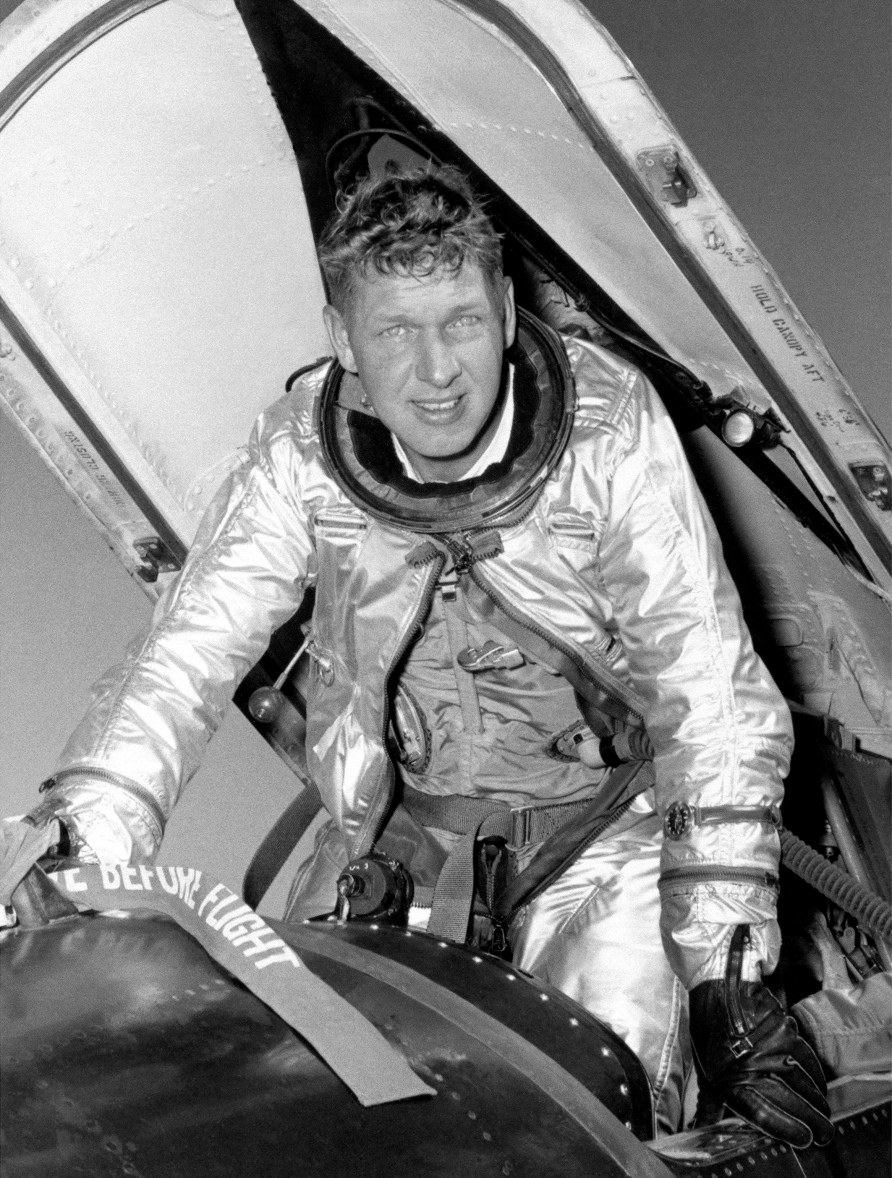
- Rushworth in the cockpit of an X-15
- Born: Robert Aitken Rushworth; October 9, 1924; Madison, Maine, U.S.
- Died: March 18, 1993 (aged 68); Camarillo, California, U.S.
- Resting place: Forest Hill Cemetery
- Other name: Bob Rushworth
- Education: University of Maine (BEng, 1951); Air University (BS, 1954)
- Occupation: Test pilot
- Space career

USAF astronaut
- Rank: Major general, USAF
- Selection: 1958 MISS Group
- Mission: X-15 Flight 87
- Retired: June 1, 1981
- Military career
- Allegiance: United States
- Branch: United States Army Air Forces; United States Air Force
- Service years: 1944–1981
- Rank: Major general
- Conflicts: World War II; Korean War; Vietnam War
- Awards: Legion of Merit; Distinguished Flying Cross; Air Medal; James H. Doolittle Award

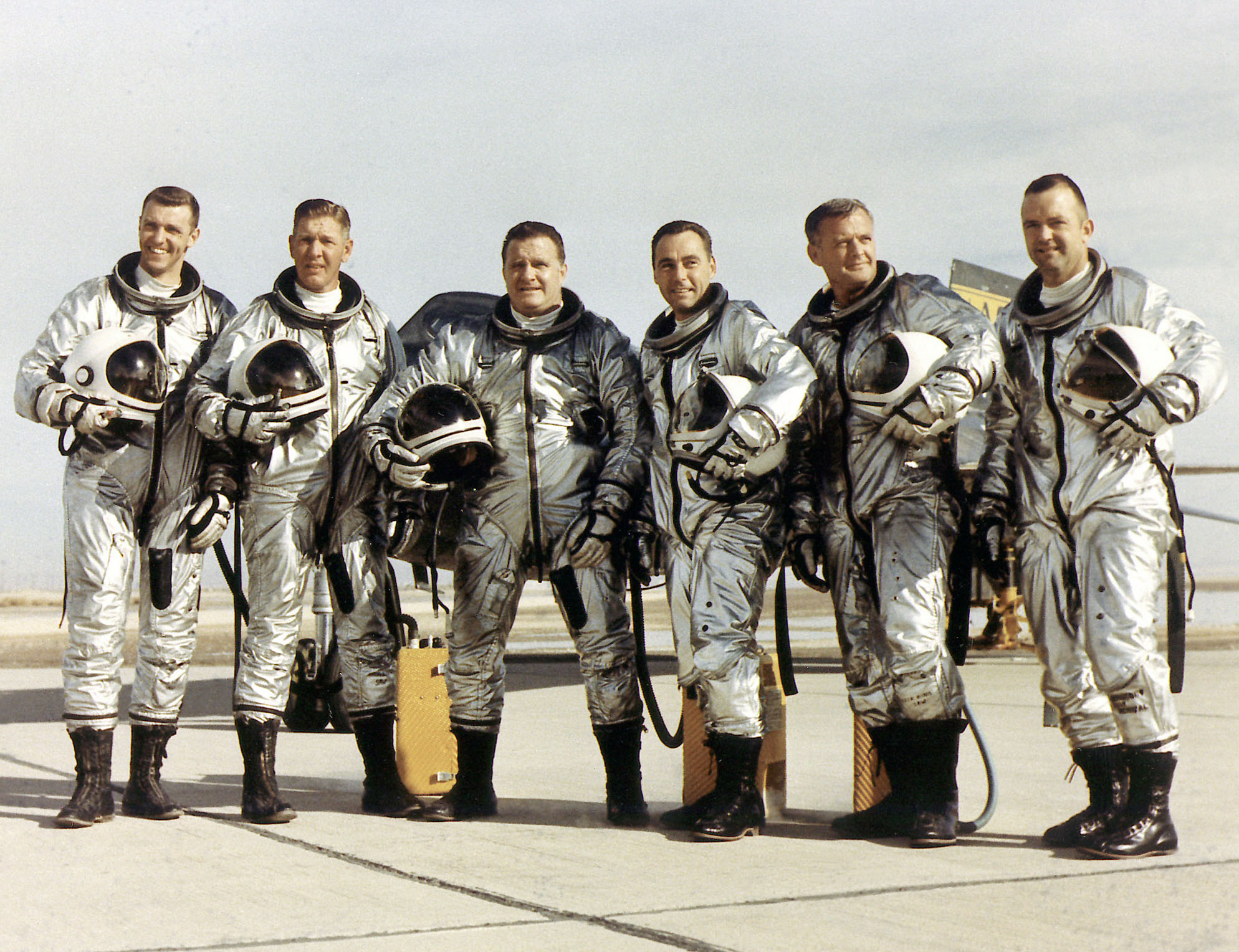
Rushworth (2nd from left) with fellow X-15 pilots

Robert Aitken "Bob" Rushworth (October 9, 1924 – March 18, 1993) was a United States Air Force major general, World War II, Korean War and Vietnam War pilot, mechanical and aeronautical engineer, test pilot and astronaut. He was one of twelve pilots who flew the North American X-15, an experimental spaceplane jointly operated by the Air Force and NASA. He flew 34 of the program's 199 flights, more than any other pilot.

On June 27, 1963, he flew the X-15 to an altitude above 50 miles, thereby qualifying as an astronaut according to the United States definition of the boundary of space. However, this altitude did not surpass the Kármán line, the internationally accepted boundary of 100 kilometers (62 miles).

== Biography ==
=== Early life and education ===
Rushworth was born on October 9, 1924, in Madison, Maine. He attended Madison Memorial High School, where he was a class president for four years, graduating in 1942. After attending Hebron Academy, a prep school, from which he graduated in June 1943, and joining the United States Army Air Forces, he studied mechanical engineering at the University of Maine, receiving a Bachelor of Engineering degree in 1951. He also received a Bachelor of Science degree in aeronautical engineering from the U.S. Air Force Institute of Technology (AFIT) in 1954. In 1967, he graduated from the National War College in Washington D.C.

=== Flight experience and military service ===
In September 1944, Rushworth earned his pilot wings and a second lieutenant commission following his aviation cadet training program graduation. His first assignment was with the 12th Combat Cargo Squadron in February 1945, in the China-Burma-India Theater of Operations, where he flew C-47 Skytrain transport combat missions from India throughout the Burma Campaign and C-46 Commandos over the "Hump" in the Himalaya Mountains to Shanghai and Beijing. After five years with the Reserve and Air National Guard, during which he received a bachelor's degree from the University of Maine, Rushworth was recalled to active duty in 1951. During Korean War, Rushworth served as a F-80C Shooting Star pilot with the 49th Fighter-Interceptor Squadron at Dow Air Force Base.

Following his graduation from the U.S. Air Force Institute of Technology in 1954, Rushworth stayed at Wright-Patterson Air Force Base in Dayton, Ohio. Among his duties was to serve at the Directorate of Flight and All-Weather Testing. There he specialized in the development and flight testing of experimental automatic flight control systems. He graduated from the Air Force Experimental Flight Test Pilot School (Class 56C) in 1957, flying F-101 Voodoos, F-102 Delta Daggers, F-104 Starfighters, F-105 Thunderchiefs, F-106 Delta Darts and other jet fighters. Rushworth was selected for the X-15 program in 1958. He made his first flight on November 4, 1960. Over the next six years, he made 34 flights in the X-15, the most of any pilot. This included a flight to an altitude of 285,000 feet, made on June 27, 1963. This flight above 50 miles qualified Rushworth for Astronaut Wings, though he would have attained that honor sooner had the USAF Man In Space Soonest project proceeded according to plan.

On a later X-15 flight, he was awarded a Distinguished Flying Cross for successfully landing a North American X-15 after its nose wheel extended while flying at nearly Mach 5. He made his final X-15 flight on July 1, 1966, then returned to regular Air Force duties. He attended F-4 Phantom II Combat Crew Training, went through survival training, and in March 1968 he was sent to Cam Ranh Bay Air Base, Republic of Vietnam, where he was assistant deputy commander for operations with the 12th Tactical Fighter Wing and flew 189 combat missions.

Following his return from Vietnam, from April 1969 to January 1971, he was program director of the AGM-65 Maverick program and in February 1971 became commander of the newly organized 4950th Test Wing, Aeronautical Systems Division, at Wright-Patterson Air Force Base, Ohio. Rushworth then served as inspector general, Air Force Systems Command, Andrews Air Force Base, Maryland, from May 1973 to February 1974. He also served as the commander of the Air Force Flight Test Center at Edwards Air Force Base, California, where his responsibilities included the major test programs, including the F-5, A-10, F-15, YF-16, YF-17 and B-1, and as the commander of the Air Force Test and Evaluation Center at Kirtland Air Force Base, New Mexico.

At the time of his retirement as a major general, he was vice commander, Aeronautical Systems Division, Air Force Systems Command, at Wright-Patterson Air Force Base, Ohio, where he dealt directly with senior deputies and managers and assisted the management of major acquisition programs such as the F-5, A-10, F-15, F-16 and B-1 as well as numerous modernization programs like the B-52 and C-5. He held this position since October 1976.

Rushworth was a fellow of the Society of Experimental Test Pilots (SETP), and in 1975 received the SETP's James H. Doolittle Award for "outstanding accomplishment in technical management or engineering achievement in aerospace technology". Rushworth retired on June 1, 1981.

He was rated a Command Pilot Astronaut and logged over 6,500 flying hours in more than 50 types of aircraft.

=== Personal ===
Rushworth married Joyce Butler (1925–1980) in June 1947, and they had one daughter, Cheri (born March 29, 1957). He died of a heart attack in Camarillo, California, on March 18, 1993, at the age of 68. He is buried at Forest Hill Cemetery in his hometown Madison, Maine.

== Awards and honors ==
"God, I don't understand it. Here's a guy hitchhiking to Vietnam."

— A general officer about Rushworth's intentions to go into combat in Vietnam.

=== Military and NASA awards ===
- Command Pilot Wings with astronaut device
- Legion of Merit with oak leaf cluster
- Distinguished Flying Cross with two oak leaf clusters
- Air Medal
- Meritorious Service Medal
- Air Force Commendation Medal
- NASA Exceptional Service Medal
- American Campaign Medal
- World War II Victory Medal
- National Defense Service Medal with star
- Vietnam Service Medal
- Republic of Vietnam Campaign Medal

=== Other awards and honors ===
- Iven C. Kincheloe Award
- James H. Doolittle Award
- John J. Montgomery Award
- Member of the Society of Experimental Test Pilots
- Enshrined in the National Aviation Hall of Fame in 1990.
- Inducted into the International Space Hall of Fame in 1991.
- Inducted posthumously into the Aerospace Walk of Honor in 1994.

== Bibliography ==
- Thompson, Milton O. (1992). At The Edge Of Space: The X-15 Flight Program. Washington and London: Smithsonian Institution Press. ISBN 1-56098-107-5.
