= Guy M. Townsend =

United States Air Force general

Guy M. Townsend III
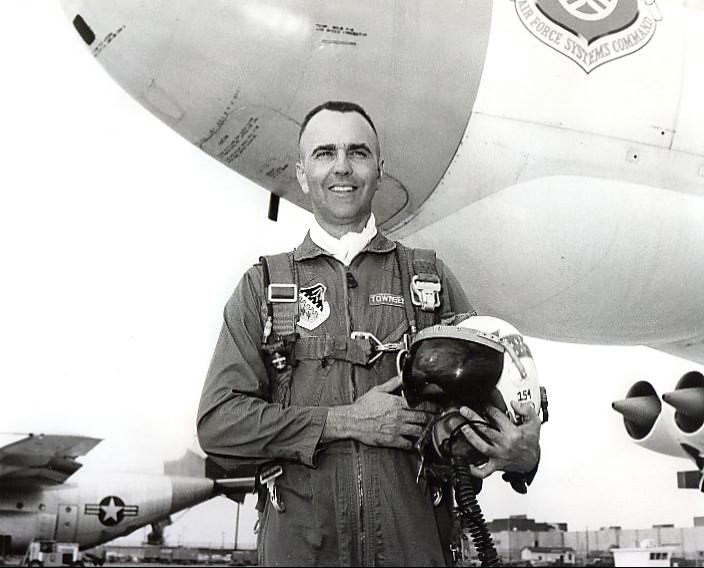
- Colonel Guy Townsend at Edwards Air Force Base in 1964
- Born: October 25, 1920; Columbus, Mississippi
- Died: March 28, 2011 (aged 90); Mercer Island, Washington
- Military career
- Allegiance: United States of America
- Branch: United States Air Force
- Service years: 1941–70 (29 years)
- Rank: Brigadier general
- Commands: Chief of Bomber Test, WPAFB; Director Materiel, 93rd Bomb Wing; Deputy Commander, Op. Power Flite; Chief of Requirements Division, SAC; Test Force Director, XB-70; Director of Flight Test, AFFTC; Director, C-5 SPO; Director, B-1 SPO
- Conflicts: World War II; Cold War
- Awards: Legion of Merit; Distinguished Flying Cross; Air Medal; Distinguished Unit Citation Emblem; Presidential Unit Citation; James H. Doolittle Award; Pathfinder Award; Aerospace Walk of Honor
- Other work: Aerospace Executive

Guy Mannering Townsend III (October 25, 1920 – March 28, 2011) was a United States Air Force brigadier general, test pilot, and combat veteran. As an Air Force officer, he served as chief of bomber test at Wright-Patterson Air Force Base, flew as co-pilot on the first flight of the B-52 Stratofortress, was test force director for the XB-70 Valkyrie, and served as program director for the C-5 Galaxy and B-1 Lancer. He was the first military pilot to fly the B-47 Stratojet, B-50 Superfortress, B-52 Stratofortress, and the prototype of the KC-135 Stratotanker. During his years at Boeing, he was the head of the Supersonic Transport operations organization.

== Biography ==
=== Early years ===
Guy Townsend was born in Columbus, Mississippi, in 1920 and graduated from San Jacinto High School in Houston, Texas, in June 1939. He attended Texas A&M University in College Station, Texas, where he studied aeronautical engineering from September 1939 to June 1941.

=== Military career ===
Townsend's military service began as an aviation cadet in the Army Air Corps in October 1941. He received pilot training at Ontario, California, and Victorville, California, and was commissioned a second lieutenant in May 1942. During World War II, Townsend flew 450 combat hours in B-17s and B-29s in the Pacific Theater of Operations. He returned home in October 1945 to serve for three years as pilot and flight test officer at Wright-Patterson Air Force Base near Dayton, Ohio. Promoted to major, he attended the Flight Performance School (later renamed the U.S. Air Force Test Pilot School) and graduated with Class 46F. Townsend demonstrated how the B-29 could be flown to 40,000 feet, well above its intended service ceiling. In 1948, he was promoted to chief of bomber test and served in this capacity for his remaining three years at Wright-Patterson. In 1951, he was assigned to the Air Force Flight Test Center (AFFTC) at Edwards Air Force Base in California, although his duties kept him primarily at Boeing in Seattle, Washington.

==== B-47 Stratojet ====
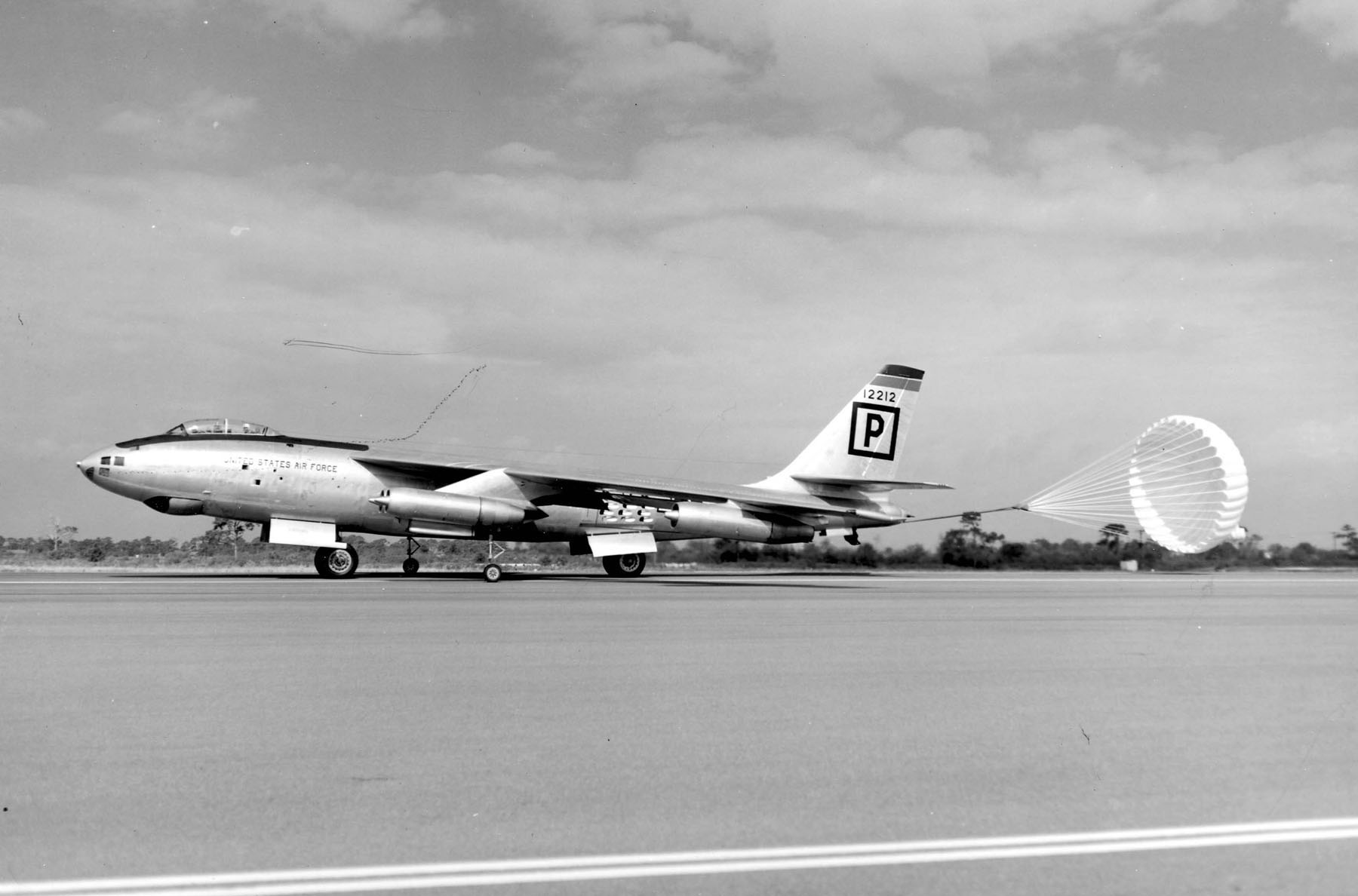
B-47 landing with deployed drag chute

In July 1948, Major Townsend started as the lead military pilot for the Air Force evaluation of the Boeing B-47 jet bomber. A result of B-47's sleek design, the aircraft required a high landing speed and an excessively long distance to stop. Townsend suggested the addition of a parachute, deployed shortly before touch-down, to shorten the landing distance. Equally dangerous, landing at a reduced engine power setting left the pilot unable to quickly command additional thrust due to the slow acceleration characteristics of early jet engines. A fellow B-47 test pilot, Major Russell E. Schleeh, proposed a second parachute, deployed while in the landing pattern, to permit a higher engine power setting during the approach.

The prototype B-47's long, swept wing was prone to twisting during roll maneuvers which caused a dangerous behavior known as aileron reversal to occur at airspeeds lower than expected. Based on experience with earlier aircraft, Townsend proposed the use of spoiler ailerons on the B-47 to reduce this unwanted behavior. The use of spoiler ailerons to reduce wing twisting was first tested on the B-47, and although not used on production B-47s, became standard issue for lateral control on many later jets.

Guy did a fantastic job of demonstrating the aircraft to K.B. It was Guy Townsend that really sold the airplane.

— Bob Robbins, B-47 test pilot

Although the B-47 held great promise, the Air Force was not particularly interested in the aircraft as its capabilities exceeded those specified for a medium bomber and fell short of those specified for a heavy bomber. Colonel Henry E. "Pete" Warden of Wright Field wanted to convince the head of the Air Force's Bomber Production, Major General K. B. Wolfe, of the merits of the B-47. He persuaded Wolfe to take a trial flight with Townsend, who put on a spectacular demonstration. After the flight, Wolfe was convinced and lent his support to the new bomber. Boeing eventually built over two thousand B-47s, more than any other United States bomber manufactured under peacetime conditions.

==== B-52 Stratofortress ====
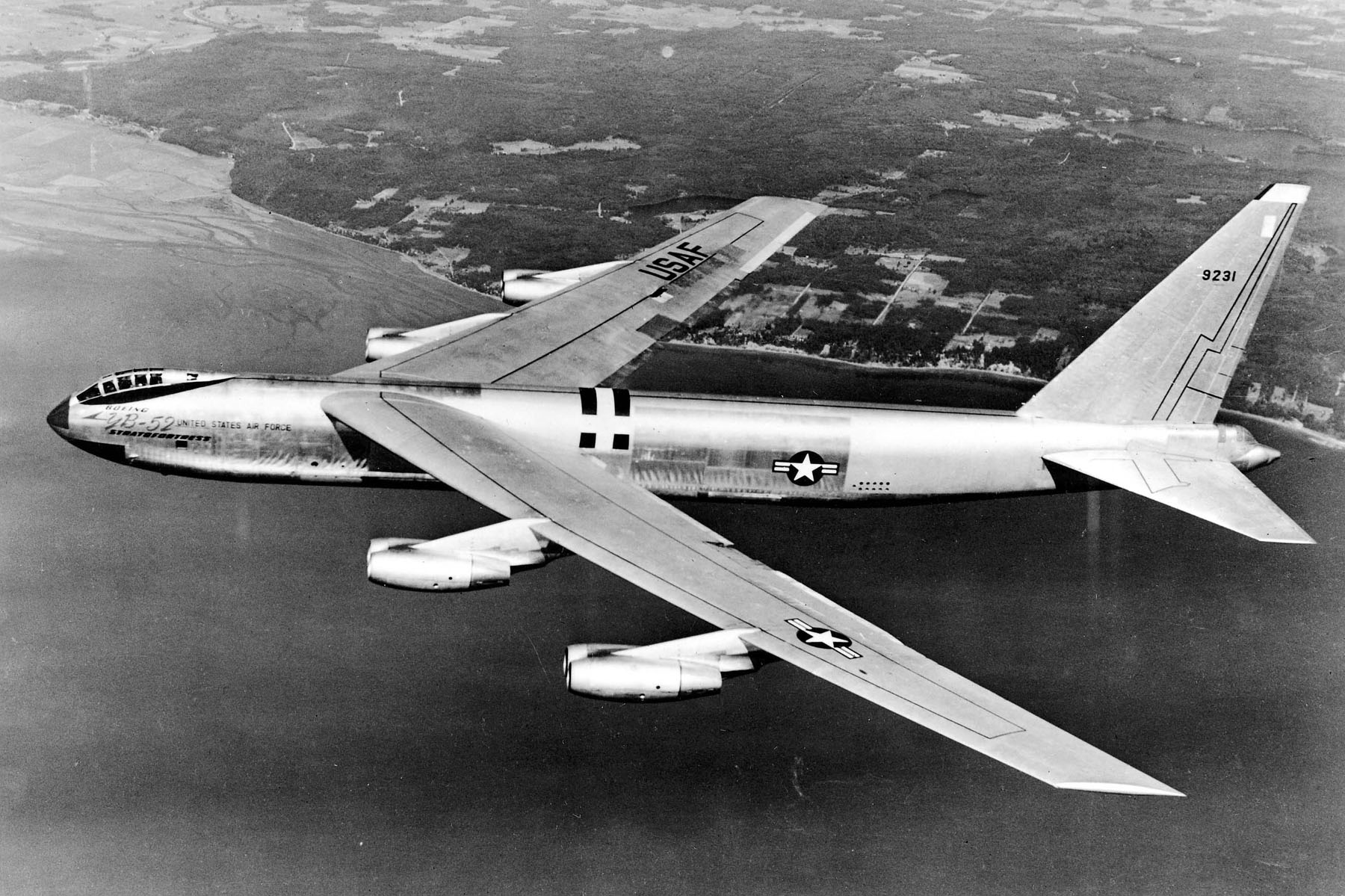
YB-52 in flight

Townsend transitioned to the B-52 program, an aircraft General Nathan Twining called "the long rifle of the air age." He participated with contractor pilots in Phase I and conducted Phases II and IV. At the time, the Air Force divided aircraft testing into seven numbered phases including: Phase 1, to determine contractor compliance with the aircraft held to 80% of design limits; Phase II, similar to Phase I but performed by Air Force pilots; and Phase IV, performance and stability testing that expanded the flight envelope to 100% of design limits.

On April 15, 1952, Boeing pilot "Tex" Johnston and co-pilot Lt. Col. Guy Townsend flew the first flight of the YB-52 prototype. The flight from Boeing Field to Moses Lake Army Air Base (later renamed Larson Air Force Base) near Moses Lake, Washington, lasted two hours and fifty-one minutes. At the time, this was the longest and most successful first flight in Boeing history. The pilots reported only relatively minor problems that were quickly corrected by Boeing engineers.

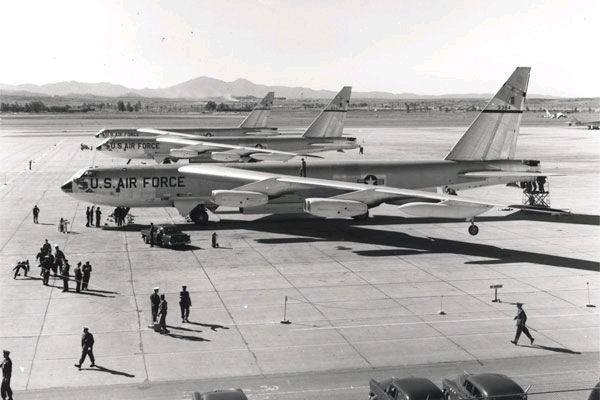
Three B-52Bs of the 93rd Bomb Wing prepare to depart Castle AFB, California, for their record-setting round-the-world flight in 1957

In 1955, Townsend left flight test for a time when was assigned as the deputy director of operations (later director of materiel) of the 93rd Bomb Wing at Castle Air Force Base in central California. The 93rd was the first wing to receive B-52 and KC-135 type aircraft. In January 1957, Townsend was deputy commander for Operation Power Flite, a group of three B-52Bs that made a nonstop flight around the world in 45 hours with several in-flight refuelings. Unfortunately, the refueling receptacle on Townsend's B-52, La Vittoria, froze solid forcing him to abort to Goose Bay Air Base in Labrador. The 93rd Bomb Wing received the Mackay Trophy for their accomplishment. In February 1958, Townsend reported to the Directorate of Operations in the headquarters of Strategic Air Command at Offutt Air Force Base, Nebraska as deputy chief of the Requirements Division. In less than a year, he was named chief of the Requirements Division.

Townsend returned to the AFFTC in March 1962 as the test force director of the XB-70 Valkyrie program. In December 1963 he became the center's director of flight test and in July 1964 the deputy for systems test. Promoted to Brigadier General, Townsend was assigned in September 1965 as director of the C-5 Galaxy system program office at the Aeronautical Systems Division of Air Force Systems Command located at Wright-Patterson Air Force Base, Ohio. In July 1968, he was assigned as deputy for systems management and in November 1969 as the systems program director of the B-1 Lancer program. Townsend retired from the Air Force on October 1, 1970.

=== Boeing career ===
After retiring from the Air Force, Townsend joined the Boeing Company as the head of the Supersonic Transport (SST) operations organization. After the SST program was cancelled in 1971, he supported a number of other Boeing efforts including the E-4 Advanced Airborne Command Post, the YC-14, the Microwave Landing System, and the B-2 Spirit. Townsend retired from Boeing in 1986.

=== Later years ===
Townsend remained active in aviation after his second retirement. In 2003 and at 82 years of age, he regularly flew aerobatics as co-owner of a private plane. He continued flying until 2007 when failing eyesight forced him to stop. Townsend shared his flight test experiences at many events including:

- B-52 50th Anniversary — A speech to 5,000 current and former Boeing employees, armed forces veterans, and others. The event was held on April 12, 2002, at the Boeing Integrated Defense Systems plant in Wichita, Kansas, to commemorate the 50th anniversary of the first flight of the B-52.
- The B-47: "A Revolution in Aviation" — A panel discussion on the design and operation of the B-47. The event was held on December 8, 2007, at the Museum of Flight in Seattle, Washington to mark the 60th anniversary of the first flight of the XB-47.
- The Boeing B-52 Stratofortress-A Story of Design Longevity — A panel presentation on the B-52's exceptional service life. The event was held on February 21, 2009, at the Museum of Flight in Seattle, Washington.

Townsend and his wife Ann lived in the Covenant Shores community on Mercer Island, Washington.

Guy Mannering Townsend III died in his sleep on March 28, 2011.

== Honors ==
Townsend was awarded the following medals for his military service: Legion of Merit, Distinguished Flying Cross, Air Medal, Distinguished Unit Citation Emblem, Presidential Unit Citation, National Defense Service Medal, and the Air Force Longevity Service Award Ribbon.

In 1969, the Society of Experimental Test Pilots presented Townsend with the James H. Doolittle Award recognizing outstanding accomplishment in technical management or engineering achievement in aerospace technology. In 1994, the Museum of Flight presented him with the Pathfinder Award recognizing those individuals with ties to the Pacific Northwest who have made significant contributions to the development of the aerospace industry. In 1995, Townsend was inducted into the Aerospace Walk of Honor in Lancaster, California, that recognizes test pilots who have contributed to aviation and space research and development. On October 25, 2002, the Flight Test Historical Foundation recognized Townsend and five others as distinguished flight test pioneers for their work on the B-52 flight test program.

Townsend was the first military pilot to fly the B-47 Stratojet, B-50 Superfortress, B-52 Stratofortress, and the 367-80 prototype of the KC-135 Stratotanker. He also test flew the Convair B-36, North American B-45, Convair XB-46, Martin XB-48, and the Martin XB-51. As of October 1968, he had logged more than 8,000 hours of flying time—5,000 in experimental flight testing in many different aircraft.
