= Richard G. Thomas =

American test pilot (1930-2006)

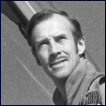
- Born: April 2, 1930; Chautauqua County, New York, U.S.
- Died: June 19, 2006 (aged 76); Lancaster, California, U.S.
- Education: Parks College of Engineering, Aviation and Technology, Saint Louis University, B.S. 1952
- Occupation: Test pilot

Richard G. Thomas (April 2, 1930 – June 19, 2006) was an American test pilot, who flew the Tacit Blue, and several spin tests on the F-5F program, including the first flights on both aircraft for the Northrop Corporation.

== Early life and education ==
Thomas was born on April 2, 1930, in Chautauqua County, New York, to parents L. Mary Thomas (née Cushing; 1905–1974), a teacher (Sherman Teachers College), and Donald A. Thomas (1901–1973). He attended Mayville Central High School and graduated in 1948, in Mayville, NY. He attended Parks College of Engineering, Aviation and Technology, at St Louis University where he joined the fraternity, Alpha Delta Gamma (Beta chapter), and majored in Aeronautical Engineering, graduating with a Bachelor of Science degree. As a graduate of ROTC, he joined the United States Air Force as a Second Lieutenant in 1952 and earned his pilot wings in 1952. After graduating from Parks College, and leaving the USAF, he worked for Beech Aircraft Company (Beechcraft Corporation) in 1956 flying all models, and served with the Kansas Air National Guard from 1956 to 1961. Then he went onto the Boeing Company in 1958, in Wichita, Kansas, where he flew the B-47 and B-52. In 1961, Boeing sent him to the U.S. Naval Test Pilot School in Patuxent River, Maryland. He then left Boeing to join Northrop, in March 1963.

== Test pilot career ==
Thomas started his career as a test pilot for Beech Aircraft Corp in 1952 in Wichita, Kansas. He flew all models for tests and sales. Thomas was also flying for the Air National Guard in Wichita where he and another National Guard pilot had a T-33 crash and burn landing at McConnel Air Base in Wichita. He left Beech and joined Boeing Aircraft flying F-100's for chase and then B-52's flying the highest altitude and the lowest in the B-52 test aircraft. Boeing selected Thomas to attend the US Navy Test Pilot School, Class 31 with future Admirals Box and Wilson.

Thomas was slated to be the chief test pilot for the TFX. Boeing did not get the contract and Thomas felt he could find more satisfying flying test at Northrop Corp. in California. He worked for Northrop from 1963 until he retired from flying in 1986. He stayed with the company until 2000, his official retirement, and completed his career with Northrop as a Technical Director applying his knowledge to the B-2 flight test program. He was recognized as a Pioneer of Stealth in 2000, for his involvement in the Tacit Blue program, a plane that utilized stealth technology. All of the information gained on this program was directly transferred to the B-2 program, as well as other aircraft designs. Thomas also did many spin tests on the F-5 program, including the first flight on the F-5F, at Edwards AFB, September 25, 1974; with a total of 107 spin tests to his credit. His "hazardous high-angle-of-attack stall and spin testing (recovery maneuver) in the F-5 established procedures now followed by fighter pilots around the world." Thomas flew envelope expansion flight tests on all models of the F-5 Freedom Fighter. He also spent time in Madrid, Spain helping the Spanish Air Force flight test the CASA C-101 and flew the aircraft in the Farnborough International Airshow in July 1978.

Thomas was involved in an ejection in the vicinity of Mount Whitney on November 4, 1965. His aircraft, an F-5A, went into an uncontrollable roll, with one aileron locked in a full-up position, and he was forced to eject. Sustaining only minor injuries, Thomas landed at 8,000 feet (2,400 m) on the eastern flank of the Sierra Nevada and was successfully rescued by helicopter, having descended to a lower elevation. The aircraft impacted the ground somewhere north of Owens Lake.

In 1964, he was assigned to fly the T-38 with three of the original Mercury Seven astronauts, Gordon Cooper, Deke Slayton, and Wally Schirra, to maintain proficiency and stay current. He also flew the T-38 with Neil Armstrong as well as Pete Conrad. During his time as a pilot for KANG (Kansas Air National Guard), he also survived a fiery crash in the T-33. In 1956, at McConnell AFB, unable to blow the canopy or jettison the fuel tanks, due to engine malfunction and electrical failure, he and the other pilot, Pat Windsor, had to hand crank the canopy to escape the burning jet. During his flying career, Thomas accumulated 8,000 hours flying more than 116 different aircraft.

== Tacit Blue ==
Thomas flew one of the most successful, high technology demonstrator programs in the history of the U.S. Air Force, Tacit Blue a top secret project that flew out of Area 51. Though originally a highly classified project; President Bill Clinton declassified some of Tacit Blue in 1996 and Thomas was then able to tell some of his story. The Tacit Blue, also known as the "whale," applied composite material and curvilinear surfaces to deflect radar. The aircraft was unstable in pitch and yaw, and employed a fly-by-wire technology. The first flight February 5, 1982, was flown by Thomas, the only civilian test pilot on the project. He flew 70 of the 135 flights that were completed, including the 100th sortie in 1984. Four other pilots included in the program were USAF pilots. Only a single plane was built, as it was a technology demonstrator aircraft, and it is now housed in the National Museum of the U.S. Air Force, (Wright Patterson Air Force Museum) in Dayton, Ohio.

== Death ==
Thomas died on June 19, 2006, after complications from Parkinson's disease. He was 76 years old.

== Personal life ==
Thomas married in 1958 to Cynda Thomas (née Smith) and had three children. He moved to the Antelope Valley in 1963, to work for Northrop Grumman at Edwards Air Force Base.

== Honors ==
Thomas became a member in 1964, and was elected a (Fellow) in 1981, of the Society of Experimental Test Pilots, (SETP). He was also a recipient of the Herman R. Salmon Award in 1977, awarded for best technical paper published in Cockpit Magazine (for the F-5 test program). He received the Iven C. Kincheloe Award in 1996 (for Tacit Blue retroactively, 1982). He was named a Pioneer of Stealth in 2000, for work on Tacit Blue. He was honored and named an "Eagle" in 2004, at the Gathering of Eagles – Flight Test Historical Foundation, Edwards, California. He was recognized by the Aerospace Walk of Honor in 2005, (monument located at Boeing Plaza), in the city of Lancaster, California. He also received an induction into the Nevada Aerospace Hall of Fame, in 2015 at Nellis AFB, for his work in Nevada on Tacit Blue at Area 51, including Groom Lake, and the Tonopah Test Range.

== Affiliations ==
- SETP – Society of Experimental Test Pilots, Lancaster, California
- QBs – Quiet Birdmen – Lancaster, California
- U.S. Naval Test Pilot School, Patuxent River, Maryland—Omega – Class #31
- Kansas Air National Guard (KANG) 1956–1961 – Wichita, Kansas
- United States Air Force (USAF – 1951–1956)
- ROTC – Reserve Officers' Training Corps

== Bibliography ==
- Thomas, Richard G. "Hell Of A Ride": The Tacit Blue Story, (2008) Iuniverse, Inc, New York, Cynda Thomas, (author) ISBN 978-0-5955-2878-3
