= Fitzhugh L. Fulton =

American test pilot

Fitzhugh L. Fulton, Jr.
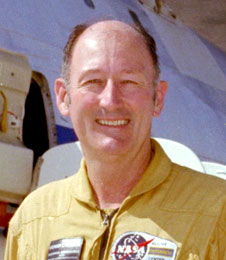
- Fitz Fulton by Shuttle Carrier Aircraft
- Born: June 6, 1925; Blakely, Georgia, U.S.
- Died: February 4, 2015 (aged 89); Thousand Oaks, California, U.S.
- Military career
- Allegiance: United States of America
- Branch: United States Air Force
- Service years: 1943–1966 (23 years)
- Rank: Lt. Colonel
- Nickname: Fitz
- Conflicts: Cold War; Korean War
- Awards: Distinguished Flying Cross (3 OLC); Air Medal (4 OLC); Iven C. Kincheloe Award; Harmon Trophy; NASA Exceptional Service Medal (2); National Aviation Hall of Fame; Aerospace Walk of Honor
- Other work: Civilian Research Pilot

Fitzhugh L. "Fitz" Fulton, Jr. (June 6, 1925 – February 4, 2015), (Lt Col, USAF), was a civilian research pilot at NASA's Dryden Flight Research Center, Edwards, California, from August 1, 1966, until July 3, 1986, following 23 years of distinguished service as a pilot in the U.S. Air Force.

== Biography ==
=== Early life and education ===
Born June 6, 1925, in Blakely, Georgia, Fulton attended Auburn University, the University of Oklahoma, and graduated with a Bachelor of Arts degree from the Golden Gate University.

=== Air Force service ===
Fulton flew 225 trips to Berlin in C-54's during the Berlin Airlift. He also flew 55 combat missions in the Douglas B-26 Invader over North Korea during Korean War. He received a Distinguished Flying Cross and five Air Medals for these missions.

Fulton completed the Air Force Experimental Test Pilot School in 1952, and served as a test pilot with the Air Force. He was a project pilot on the B-58 supersonic bomber program and set an international altitude record of 85,360 feet with the aircraft carrying a payload of 5,000 kilograms (11,023 pounds) in 1962. He received the 1962 Harmon International Aviation Trophy for his work on the program.

Fulton was also assigned as the Air Force pilot on the B-52 launch aircraft for the X-15 research aircraft and other air-launched vehicles.

During his earlier Air Force career Fulton received three Distinguished Flying Cross medals for his test pilot work. He flew the XB-70 prototype supersonic bomber on both NASA-USAF tests and NASA research flights during the late 1960s, attaining speeds exceeding Mach 3. He was also a project pilot on the YF-12A and YF-12C research program from April 14, 1969, until September 25, 1978. The planes were flown at speeds and altitudes in excess of 2,000 mph and 70,000 feet to acquire flight data for the development of future aircraft.

Fulton retired from the USAF in 1966 after a 23-year career. At the time, he was Chief of Bomber Transport Test Operations Division at Edwards Air Force Base.

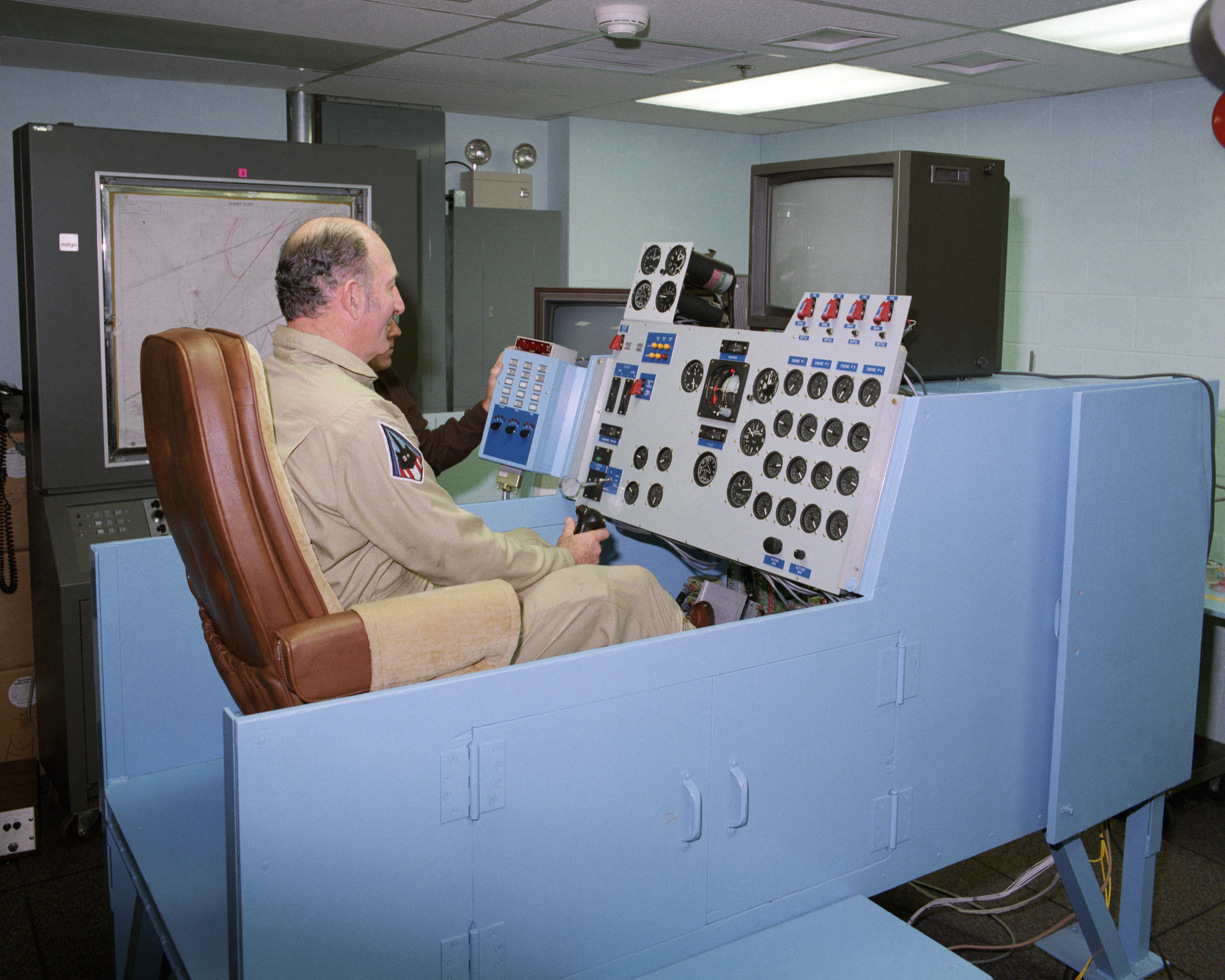
Fulton in CID simulator

=== NASA test pilot ===
Fulton was the project pilot on all early tests of the Boeing 747 Space Shuttle Carrier Aircraft (SCA) used to air launch the Space Shuttle prototype Enterprise in the Approach and Landing Tests (ALT) at Dryden in 1977. During these flights, the SCA carried Enterprise to an altitude of about 25,000 feet, where it was separated from the 747 and flown to a landing by the Shuttle test crew in five flights. Several uncrewed and crewed captive flights preceded the free flights.

For his work in the ALT program, Fulton received the NASA Exceptional Service Medal. He also received the Exceptional Service Medal again in 1983 for flying the 747 SCA during the European tour of the Space Shuttle Enterprise. After orbital flights began in 1981, Fulton continued to fly the SCA during ferry missions returning Orbiters to the Kennedy Space Center Florida.

During his career at Dryden, Fulton was project pilot on NASA's B-29, B-50, and B-52 bombers launch aircraft used to air launch a variety of piloted and unpiloted research aircraft, including the X-1, X-2, X-15s, and M-2, HL-10, and X-24 rocket airplanes. He was also project pilot on the Laminar Flow Control Leading Edge research program using a specially modified C-140 JetStar.

Fulton was the project pilot for the FAA/NASA Controlled Impact Demonstration program during 1984. It culminated on December 1, 1984, when he remotely flew an unpiloted, heavily instrumented Boeing 720 to a prepared impact point on Rogers Dry Lake to test the flammability of anti-misting jet fuel in a crash situation.

He was named a Fellow of the Society of Experimental Test Pilots, and in 1977 received the Society's Iven C. Kincheloe Award as Test Pilot of the Year for his work on the ALT program. At the time of his NASA retirement in 1986, Fulton had over 16,000 flying hours in 235 types of aircraft.

=== Scaled composites ===
After retiring from NASA, Fulton hired on as the Flight Operations Director and Chief Research Pilot for Burt Rutan's Scaled Composites. There, he flew the maiden flights on the Advanced Technology Tactical Transport and the Scaled Composites Triumph twin engine executive jet.

=== Personal life ===
He was married to Erma Fulton and they had three children. He left Florida and moved to the Antelope Valley to work at Edwards AFB. He died on February 4, 2015, of Parkinson's disease, at age 89.

== Awards ==
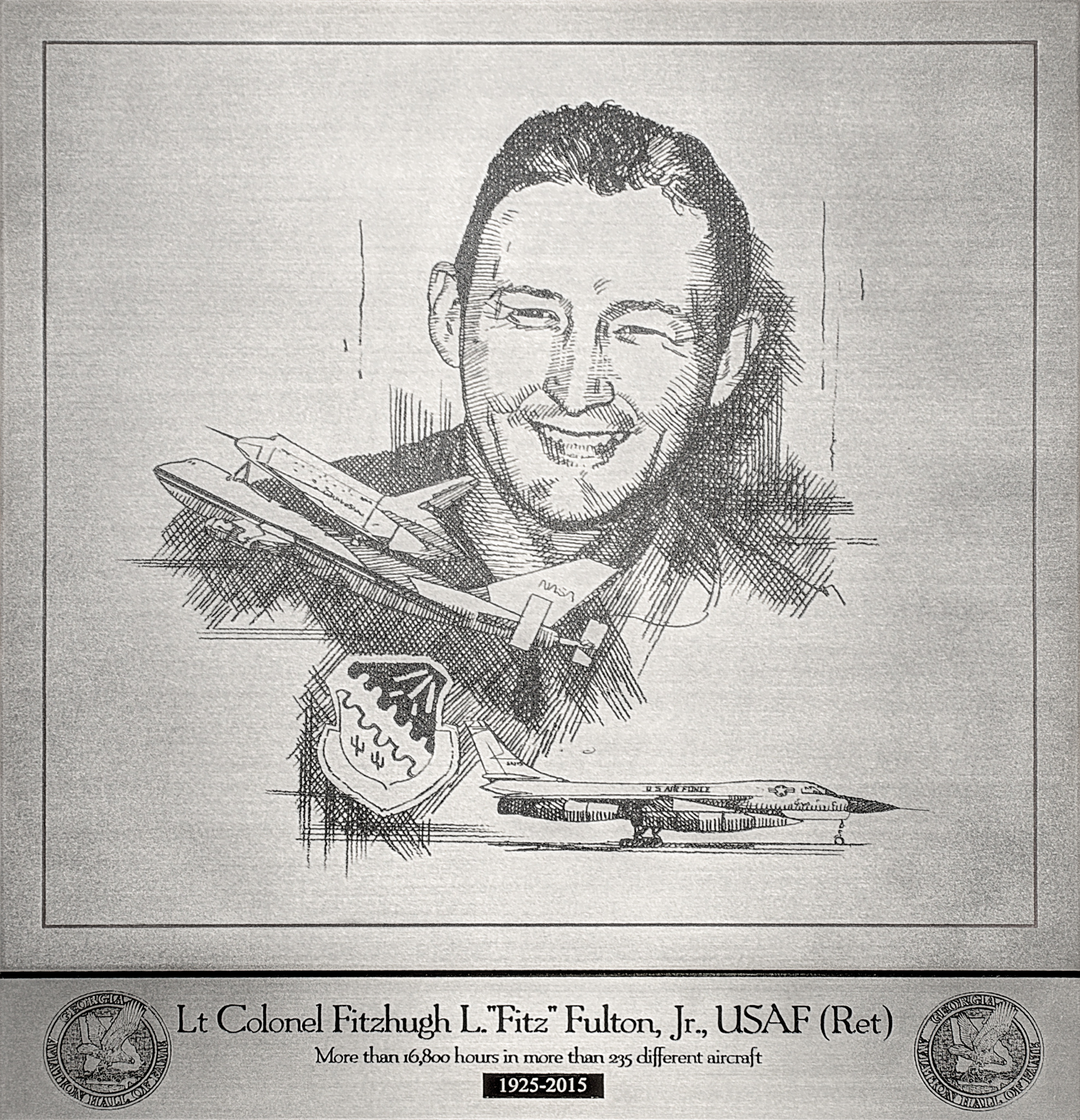
Plaque of Fulton at the Georgia Aviation Hall of Fame

- Aerospace Walk of Honor (1991)
- Air Force Experimental Test Pilot School "Distinguished Alumnus"
- Distinguished Flying Cross (four awards)
- Air Medals (five awards)
- Harmon International Aviation Trophy (1962)
- NASA Exceptional Service Medal (two awards)
- Georgia Aviation Hall of Fame (1995)
- National Aviation Hall of Fame (1999)
- SETP Iven C. Kincheloe Award (1977)
- Philip J. Klass Award for Lifetime Achievement (2003)
- International Air & Space Hall of Fame inductee (2014)
