= Dick Johnson (test pilot) =

Richard Lowe Johnson (September 21, 1917 – November 9, 2002) is best known for being chief test pilot for Convair, a division of the American defence contractor General Dynamics, and as a founding member of the Society of Experimental Test Pilots in 1955.

== Biography ==
Johnson was born in Cooperstown, North Dakota, and educated at Oregon State University. In 1942, Johnson enlisted in the US Army Air Corps and served as a P-47 Thunderbolt pilot with the 57th Group's, 66th Fighter Squadron, in North Africa and Italy. He completed 180 combat missions and was awarded the Silver Star, the Legion of Merit, four Distinguished Flying Crosses and fourteen Air Medals. Johnson graduated from the Air Materiel Command Engineering Test Pilot School in 1946. The F-86A set its first official world speed record of 671 miles per hour (1,080 km/h) on September 15, 1948, at Muroc Dry Lake flown by Major Richard L. Johnson, USAF. Johnson remained in the US Air Force until 1953, having reached the rank of lieutenant colonel.

He died of brain cancer on November 9, 2002, and was buried with full military honors at Arlington National Cemetery.

== Decorations ==
- Silver Star
- Legion of Merit
- Distinguished Flying Cross with 3 oak leaf clusters
- Air Medal with 13 oak leaf clusters

== Other awards ==
- Ivan C. Kincheloe Award in 1967, for the General Dynamics F-111 test program.
