= Tony LeVier =

American air racer and test pilot (1913-1988)

Anthony W. LeVier
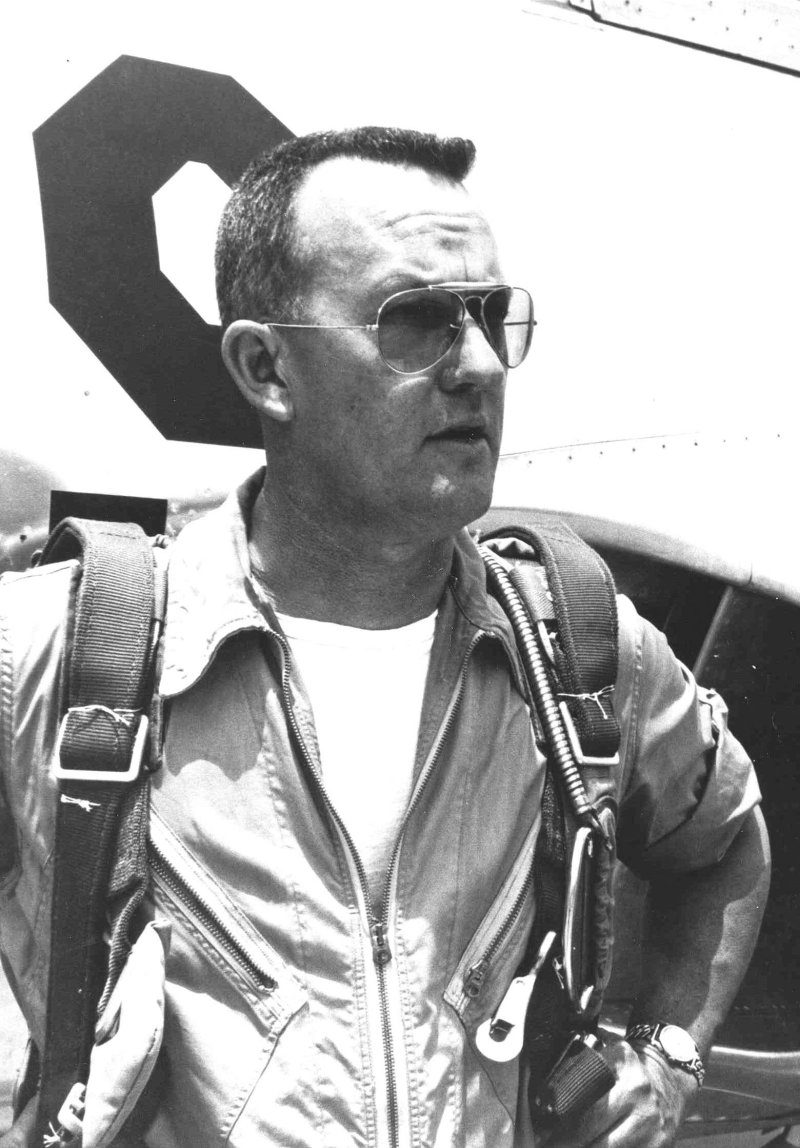
- Born: Anthony Puck; February 14, 1913; Duluth, Minnesota, United States
- Died: February 6, 1998 (aged 84); Los Angeles, California, United States

Anthony W. LeVier (February 14, 1913 – February 6, 1998) was an American air racer and test pilot for the Lockheed Corporation from the 1940s to the 1970s.

== Early life ==
Born Anthony Puck in Duluth, Minnesota, his father died while he was still young. His mother, Aloysia Evans, moved Tony and his older sister Nancy to southern California for the warmer climate. While Tony was a teenager, his mother remarried, to Oscar LeVier, who gave the children his name.

From an early age, LeVier had been much more interested in flying than his studies, so he dropped out of high school to pursue flying full-time. He worked odd jobs to pay for food and flying, mostly maintaining airplanes or flight instructing.

== Air racing ==
In 1936, LeVier began to try his hand at air racing, starting with the national air races in Los Angeles. In 1938 he flew, for the first time, a Keith Rider racer dubbed The Firecracker, owned by air racing enthusiast Bill Schoenfeldt. In this plane, he won the Greve Trophy in Cleveland that year. His landing after that flight was rough and damaged the aircraft too heavily to allow him to compete for the Thompson Trophy the next day. A year later, he was back in Cleveland, and this time placed second in the Thompson race.

== Postwar air racing ==
After the end of World War II, LeVier bought a war surplus P-38 Lightning for $1,250 in Kingman, Arizona. He modified it for air racing and painted it bright red. He competed at the national air races in Cleveland in 1946 and won second place in the Thompson Trophy.

== Mechanic and airline pilot ==
After the 1939 races, LeVier got his first formal job, working as a mechanic for the Douglas Aircraft Company, hoping to get promoted to test pilot. However, frustrated by his chances with that company, he earned an instrument rating and went to work for Mid-Continent Airlines in Kansas City. Six months later, though, he left that job also, to work with General Motors testing engines for Cessna aircraft in Wichita. When a job opened for him at the Lockheed Corporation in Burbank, California, he left Wichita and returned to southern California.

== Lockheed career ==
LeVier started at Lockheed ferrying Hudson bombers to Canada for delivery to the Royal Air Force. He later trained and checked out pilots in the Hudson and its transport variant, the Lodestar. His job description was changed to engineering test pilot in 1942 to fly the PV-1 Ventura.

LeVier's test flying was instrumental in proving the Lockheed P-38 Lightning design. He and chief engineering test pilot Milo Burcham alternated flying dive tests to observe the design's performance at transonic speeds. To demonstrate the reliability of the design in the hands of a skilled pilot, he performed aerobatic shows for students at the Polaris Flight school at War Eagle Field in nearby Lancaster.

In 1944, LeVier visited Eighth Air Force air bases in Great Britain to demonstrate the engine-out reliability of the P-38. He left England less than a week before the invasion of Normandy.

== P-80 Shooting Star ==
When LeVier returned to the United States, testing of the P-80 Shooting Star jet fighter was underway. He had made the first flight of the XP-80A in January, and the testing program continued through 1944 and into 1945. In October 1944, Milo Burcham was killed in the crash of a production P-80, and Tony LeVier filled his office as chief engineering test pilot in January 1945.

Just two months into his career as head of this department, LeVier suffered a serious crash on March 20, 1945, when his P-80 lost its tail due to a faulty turbine blade. Upon landing, he broke his back and had to wear a brace during his recovery, but six months after his crash, he was back in the air.

LeVier tested two evolutions of the P-80: the T-33 and the three variants of the F-94 Starfire. He also performed most of the tests of the XF-90 penetration fighter prototype. He also flew the first flights of the XF-104 Starfighter, and the U-2.

In 1972, LeVier took an L-1011 Tristar on a world tour promoting Lockheed's newest and largest commercial airliner.

LeVier was succeeded as chief engineering test pilot at Lockheed by Herman "Fish" Salmon. He died at the age of 84 on February 6, 1998, from complications of cancer and kidney failure, after surviving eight crashes and one mid-air collision.

== Awards ==
- Aviation Week & Space Technology Flight Safety Award, 1971.
- National Aviation Hall of Fame inductee, 1978.
- National Aeronautic Association Elder Statesman Award, 1986.
- National Aviation Club Clifford Henderson Award for Achievement, 1986.
- Aerospace Walk of Honor inductee, 1990.
- Society of Experimental Test Pilots James H. Doolittle Award, 1993
- International Air & Space Hall of Fame inductee, 1993.
- Godfrey L. Cabot Award, 1995.
- National Air and Space Museum Lifetime Achievement Trophy, 1997.
- He was inducted into the Motorsports Hall of Fame of America in 2001.

The Society of Experimental Test Pilots annually presents the Tony LeVier Flight Test Safety Award.

== First flights ==
The following is an incomplete list of the first flights of a new design that were piloted or copiloted by Tony LeVier during his career at Lockheed. Photographs do not necessarily depict the first flight.

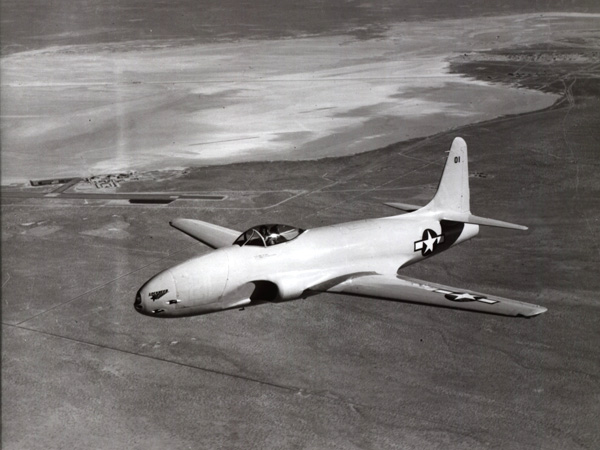
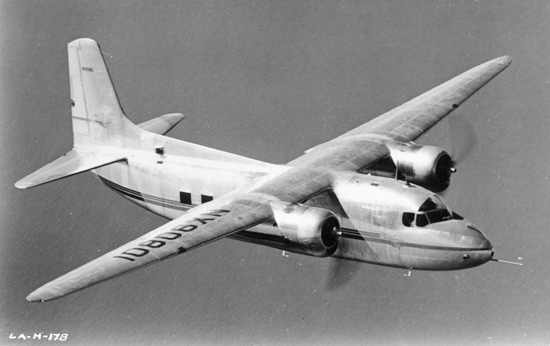
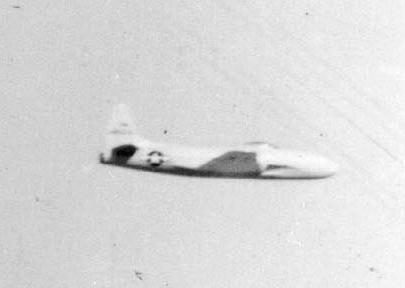
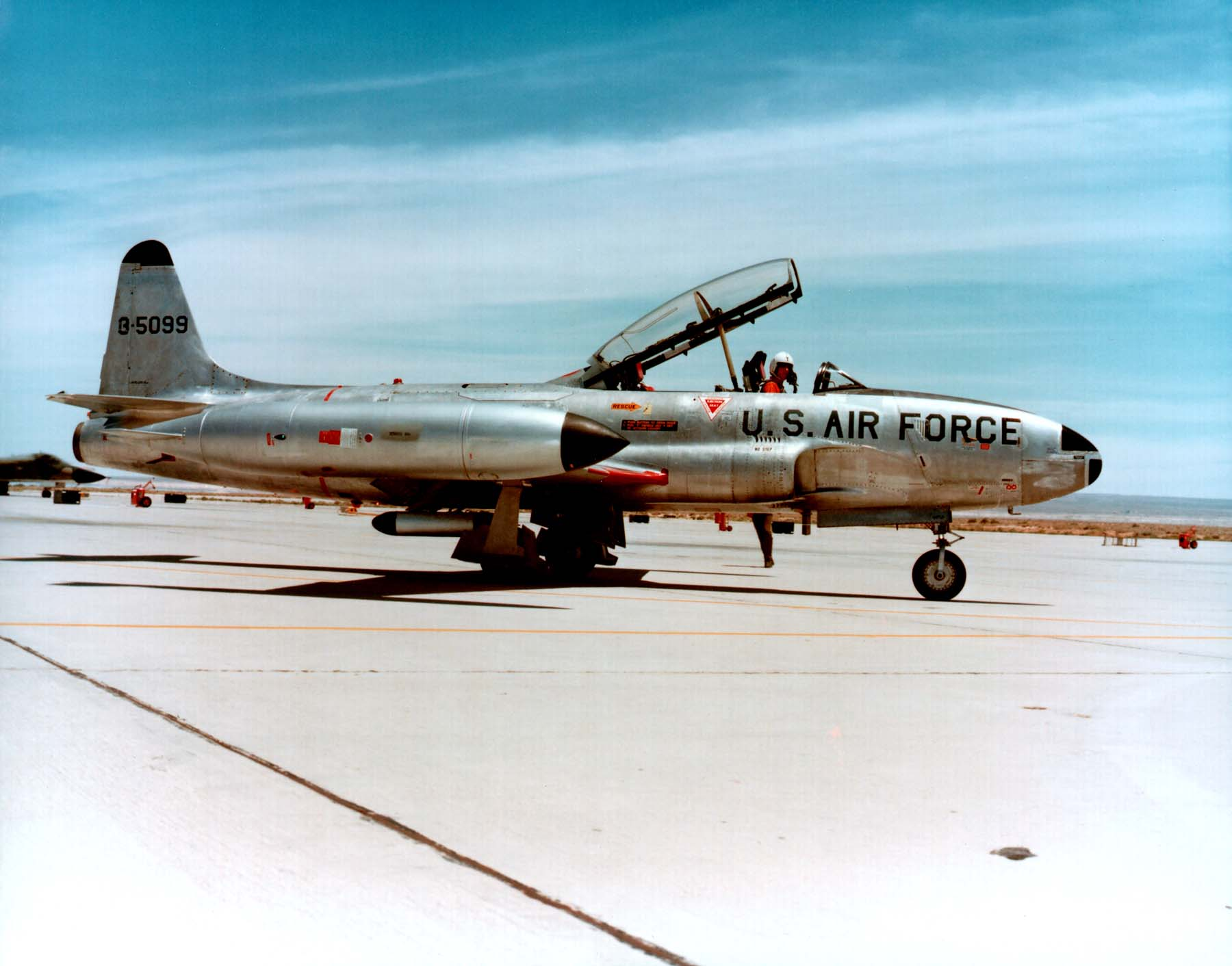
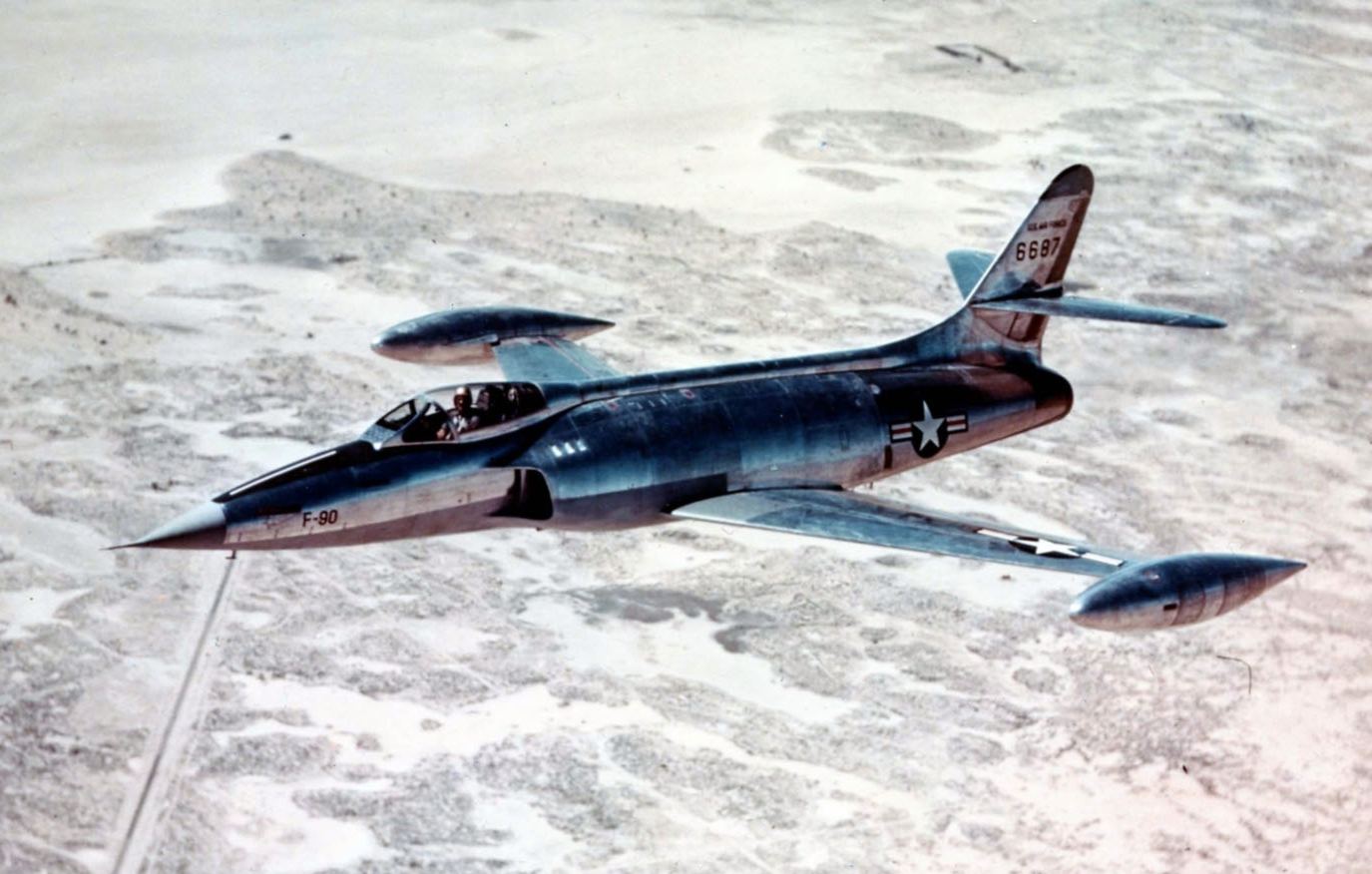
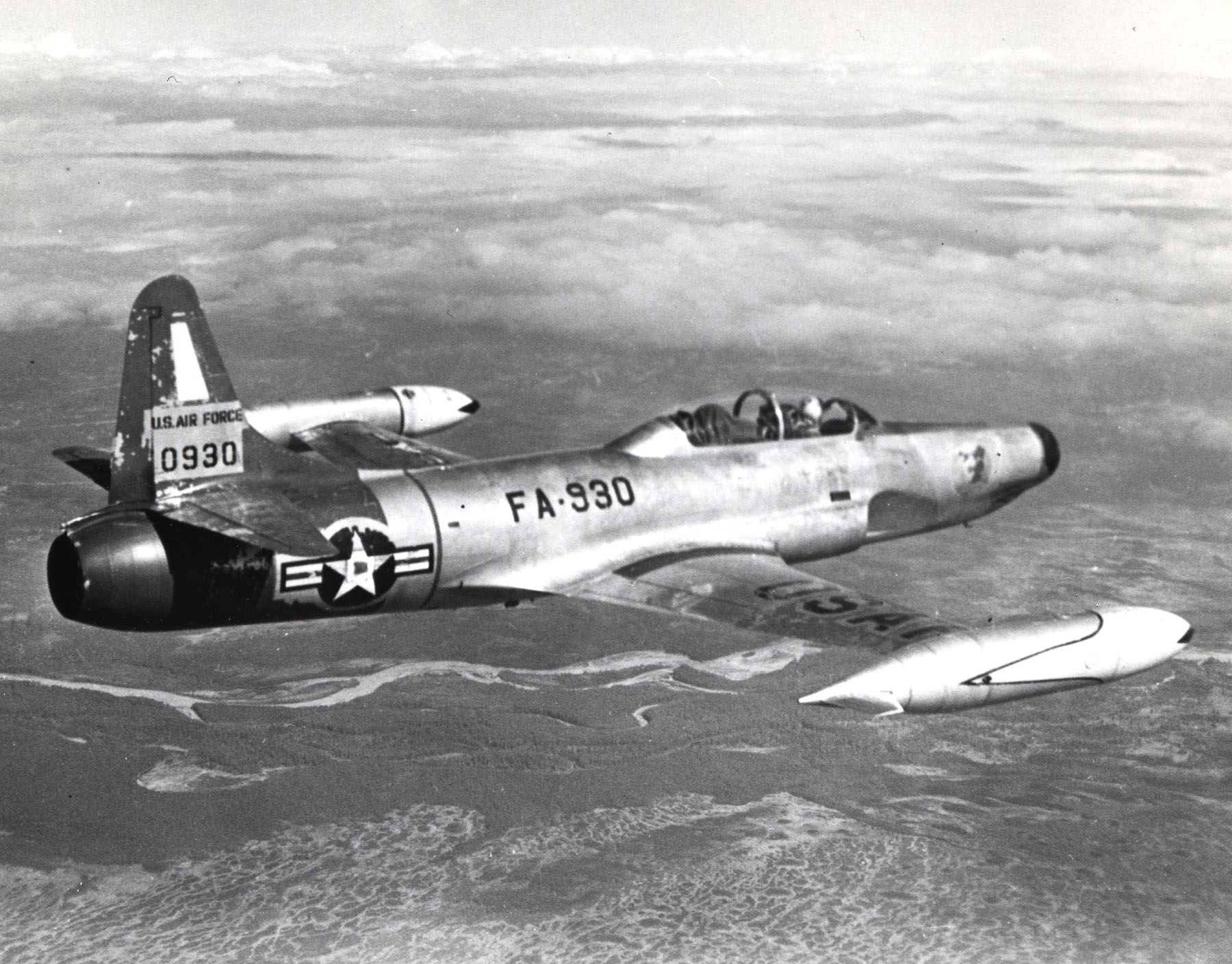
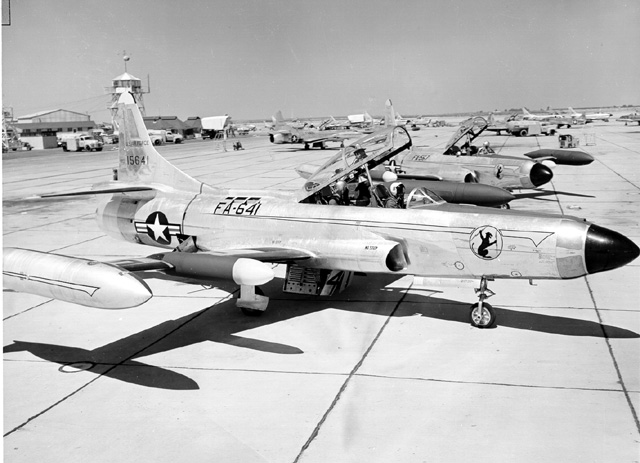
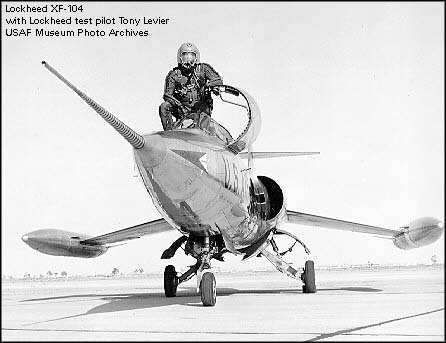
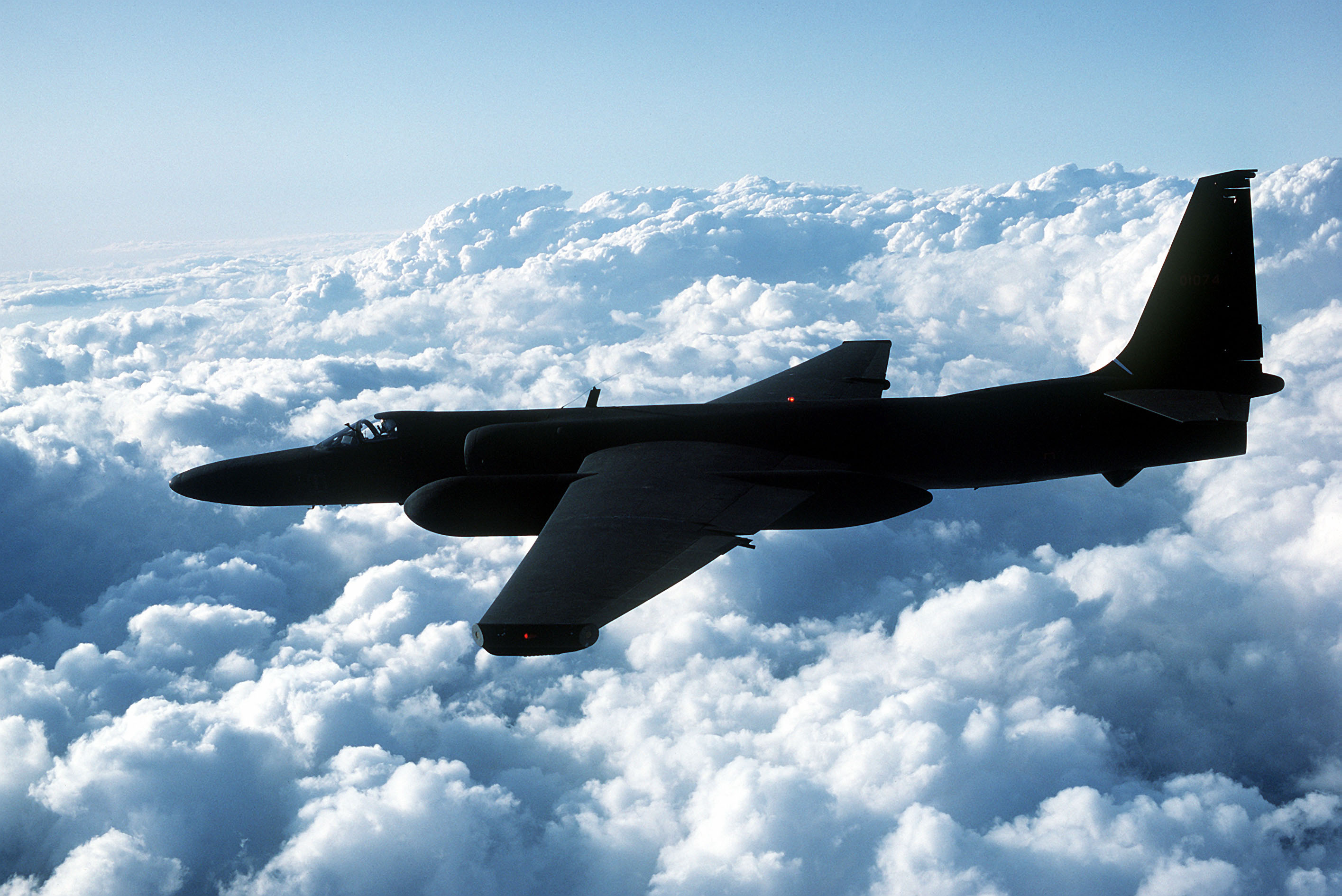
Aircraft	Date	Remarks
XP-80A	January 8, 1944
Saturn	June 17, 1946
XR6O-1 Constitution	November 9, 1946	copiloted with Joe Towle
P-80R Racey	1946
T-33 Shooting Star	March 22, 1948
XF-90	June 3, 1949
F-94A Starfire	April 16, 1949
F-94C Starfire	January 19, 1950
XF-104 Starfighter	February 28, 1954
U-2	August 4, 1955
