= Iven Carl Kincheloe Jr. =

American flying ace

Iven C. Kincheloe Jr.
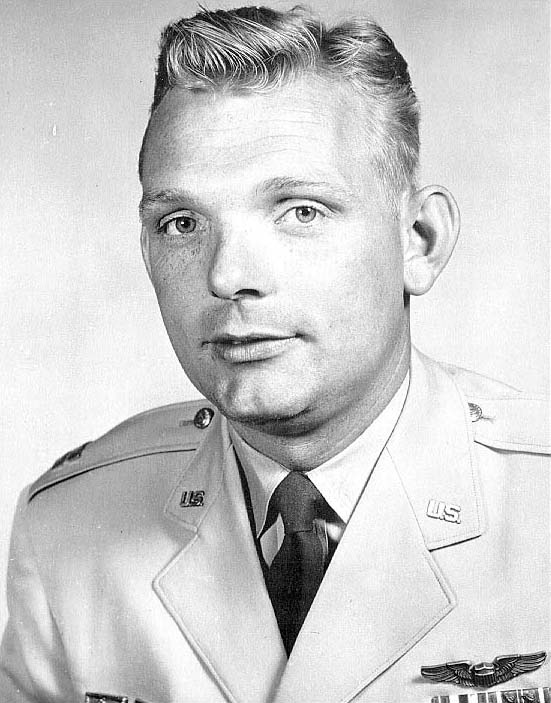
- Born: Iven Carl Kincheloe Jr. July 2, 1928; Detroit, Michigan, U.S.
- Died: July 26, 1958 (aged 30); Edwards Air Force Base, California, U.S.
- Cause of death: Air crash
- Resting place: Arlington National Cemetery
- Education: Purdue University, B.S. 1949
- Known for: near-space altitude record
- Awards: Silver Star; Legion of Merit; Distinguished Flying Cross (3); Air Medal (4)
- Aviation career
- Air force: United States Air Force
- Battles: Korean War
- Rank: Captain

Iven Carl "Kinch" Kincheloe Jr. (Note: Iven Carl Kincheloe Jr. is on his grave marker at Arlington National Cemetery. However, his first name is sometimes spelled Ivan. Tom Wolfe's 1979 book, The Right Stuff, consistently uses Iven.) (July 2, 1928 – July 26, 1958) was an American pilot. He served in the U.S. Air Force during the Korean War, in which he was recognized as a flying ace. He continued as a test pilot after the war, participating in the Bell X-2 program, in which he set an altitude record of 126,200 feet (38,470 m) in 1956. For this suborbital flight above 99.66 percent of Earth's atmosphere, he became known as "The First Spaceman". He was selected for the Air Force's program to put a man in space, but was killed in a plane crash in 1958.

== Early life and education ==
Born July 2, 1928, in Detroit, Michigan, Kincheloe grew up in Cassopolis in the southwest part of the state, the only child of Iven C. Kincheloe Sr. (1894–1966) and Frances Wilder Kincheloe. Interested in aviation from a very young age, he graduated from Dowagiac High School in 1945 and attended Purdue University in West Lafayette, Indiana.

Kincheloe joined the Reserve Officers' Training Corps (ROTC), was a member of Sigma Phi Epsilon fraternity (Indiana Alpha), and graduated with a Bachelor of Science degree in aeronautical engineering in 1949. In the summer of 1948, the ROTC cadet met test pilot Chuck Yeager and sat in the cockpit of the Bell X-1.

== Korean War ==
Upon graduation from college, Kincheloe received his commission as a second lieutenant in the U.S. Air Force and entered flight training. After earning his pilot wings in August 1950, he spent a year as a test pilot, flying the F-86E at Edwards Air Force Base, California, was promoted to first lieutenant, and transferred to Korea in September 1951.

During the war, he was assigned to the 25th Fighter-Interceptor Squadron, he flew F-80s on thirty combat missions and F-86s on 101 combat missions, downing five MiG-15s (becoming an ace and earning the Silver Star) before returning to the U.S. in May 1952. At this time, he had reached the rank of captain.

== Post-war career ==
After the war, Kincheloe was a gunnery instructor at Nellis Air Force Base outside Las Vegas, Nevada, then resumed his activity as a test pilot (subsequent to his prior flight test activities associated with the F-86E), graduating in December 1954 from the Empire Test Pilots' School at Farnborough, England. He participated in the testing of the Century Series of fighter aircraft (F-100 Super Sabre, F-101 Voodoo, F-102 Delta Dagger, F-104 Starfighter, F-105 Thunderchief, and F-106 Delta Dart).

In the mid-1950s, Kincheloe joined the Bell X-2 program and on September 7, 1956, flew at more than 2,000 mph (3,220 km/h) and to a height of 126,200 feet (38,470 m) (some sources list 126,500), the first flight ever above 100,000 feet (30,480 m), above 30 km (18.6 mi) and above 20 mi (32.2 km). For this he was nicknamed "America's No. 1 Spaceman". However, this altitude is below the Kármán line, the threshold for "space" later established by the Fédération aéronautique internationale (Note: The FAI established 100 km (62.14 mi) as a space boundary which isn't exactly the altitude of the (varying) Kármán line.), as well as below the 50-mile-boundary used by the U.S. Air Force. He was awarded the Mackay Trophy for 1956 for the flight.

The X-2 program was halted three weeks later, after a crash resulted in the death of Mel Apt in a flight in which he became the first person to exceed Mach 3. Kincheloe was later selected as one of the first three pilots in the next rocket-powered aircraft program, the X-15, and would have been part of the Man in Space Soonest project.

Kincheloe appeared as a contestant on the CBS television program, I've Got a Secret, on the January 29, 1958 episode. His secret was “I’ve gone higher into space than any other human being”.

== Death and legacy ==
In July 1958, Kincheloe was killed in the crash of an F-104A (Lockheed F-104A-10-LO s/n 56-772) at Edwards Air Force Base. He had ejected at low altitude, but given that the early F-104 used a downwards catapulted ejection seat, the deployed parachute did not adequately slow his descent. He was buried with full military honors at Arlington National Cemetery. Only thirty years old, Kincheloe was survived by wife, Dorothy, their son, and a daughter who was born two months later.

- On September 25, 1959, Kincheloe Air Force Base in Michigan's Upper Peninsula was renamed in his honor; formerly Kinross Air Force Base, it closed in 1977.
- A monument stands approximately 1½ miles (2½ km) east of his hometown of Cassopolis, Michigan; an angular stone slab twelve feet (3.7 m) in height, it bears a silver model of the X-2 pointed skyward. (41.915°N 85.973°W)
- Kincheloe Elementary School, part of the nearby Dowagiac Union School District, is named in his honor.
- In 1992, he was inducted into the Aerospace Walk of Honor.
- In 2011, he was inducted into the National Aviation Hall of Fame.
- In 1958 the Society of Experimental Test Pilots created the Iven C. Kincheloe Award, which is still awarded yearly for "Outstanding professional accomplishment in the conduct of flight testing".

== Awards and decorations ==

USAF Senior pilot badge
Silver Star		Legion of Merit
Distinguished Flying Cross with two bronze oak leaf clusters	Air Medal with three bronze oak leaf clusters	Air Force Presidential Unit Citation with bronze oak leaf cluster
National Defense Service Medal	Korean Service Medal with three bronze campaign stars	Air Force Longevity Service Award with bronze oak leaf cluster
Republic of Korea Presidential Unit Citation	United Nations Korea Medal	Korean War Service Medal

=== Silver Star citation ===
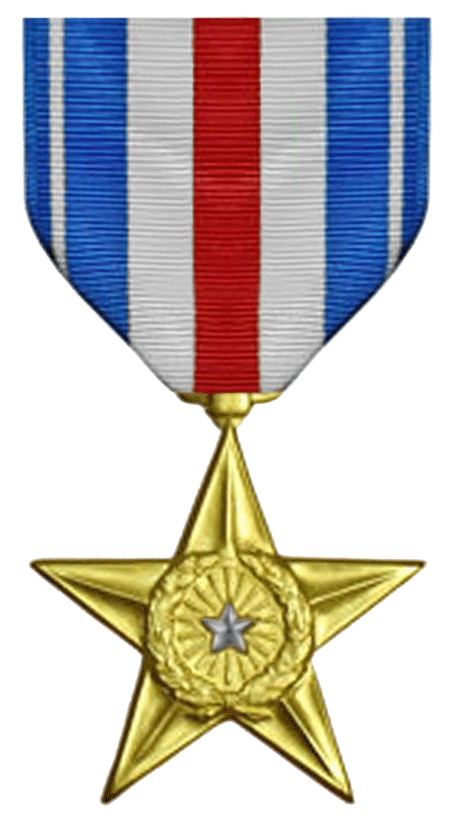

Kincheloe, Iven C.
Captain U.S. Air Force
25th Fighter-Interceptor Squadron, 51st Fighter-Interceptor Group, Fifth Air Force
Date of Action: April 1, 1952

Citation:

The President of the United States of America, authorized by Act of Congress, July 9, 1918, takes pleasure in presenting the Silver Star to Captain Iven Carl Kincheloe, United States Air Force, for gallantry in action against an enemy of the United Nations as Pilot of an F-86 Fighter Plane in the 25th Fighter-Interceptor Squadron, 51st Fighter-Interceptor Group, Fifth Air Force, on 1 April 1952. While leading a flight of four F-86 type aircraft, Captain Kincheloe encountered sixteen enemy aircraft attempting to intercept friendly fighter-bombers, Captain Kincheloe quickly broke his flight into elements to engage the enemy, and boldly attacked although greatly outnumbered. He pressed attacks against two of the enemy, completely disregarding efforts of other aircraft to deter him. Displaying unusual aggressiveness, Captain Kincheloe severely damaged the aircraft of the enemy flight leader, forcing him to eject himself, and despite heavy damage to his own aircraft, attacked another and destroyed it completely. Captain Kincheloe's destruction of the two aircraft effectively broke up the enemy force and prevented their attack on the friendly fighter-bombers. Through his personal courage, outstanding airmanship, and devotion to duty, Captain Kincheloe reflected great credit upon himself, the Far East Air Forces, and the United States Air Force.

== See also ==
- List of Korean War air aces

== Notes ==
Preceded by Arthur W. Murray	Human altitude record 1956-1960	Succeeded by Robert Michael White
