= Joseph John "Tym" Tymczyszyn =

American test pilot

Joseph J. Tymczyszyn
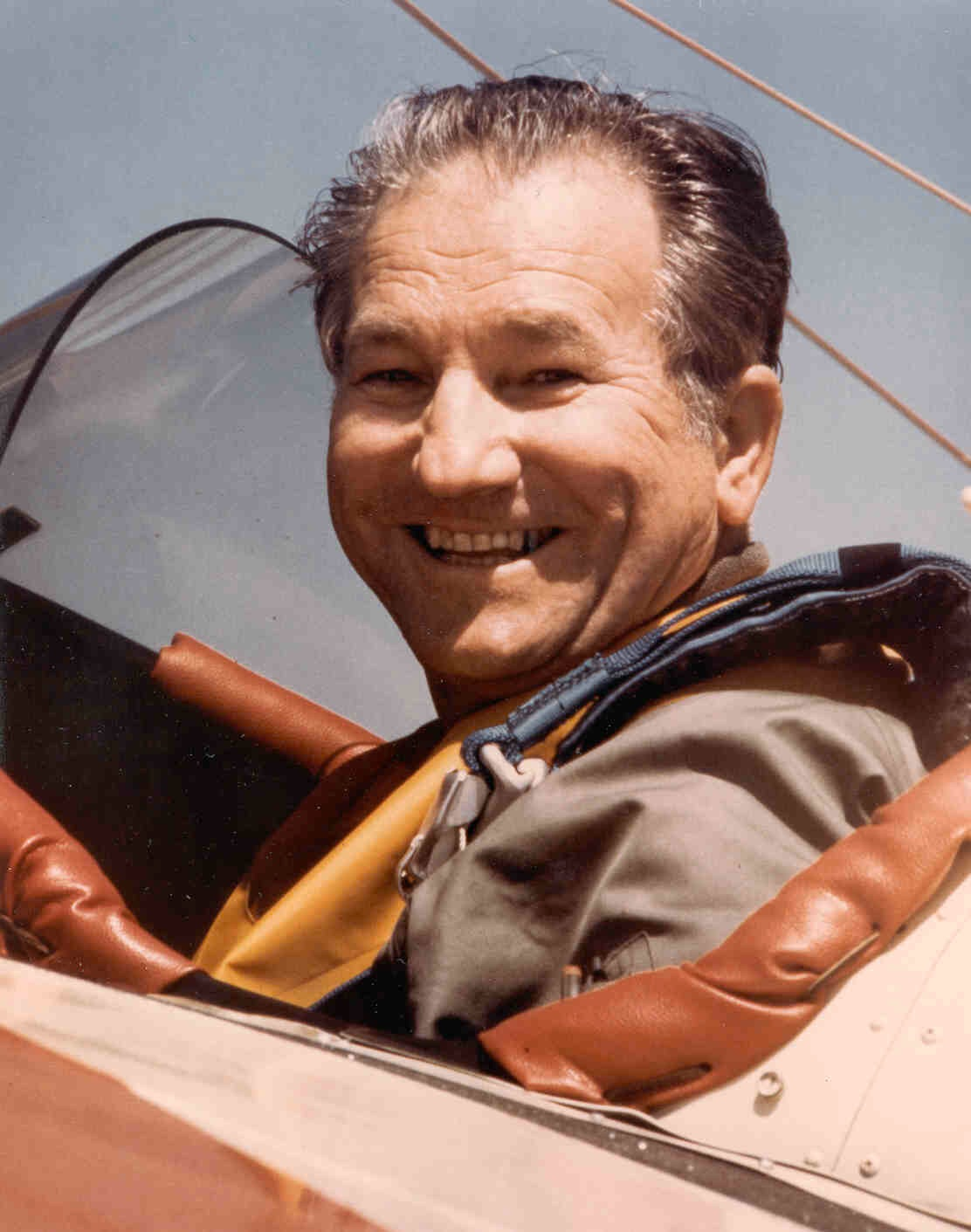
- Tymczyszyn in 1986
- Born: Joseph John "Tym" Tymczyszyn; August 12, 1918; Wilkes-Barre, Pennsylvania, U.S.
- Died: February 19, 1999 (aged 80); Rancho Palos Verdes, California, U.S.
- Education: University of Washington, B.S. 1948
- Known for: Test Pilot on America's First Commercial Jet Aircraft, the Boeing 707
- Aviation career
- Battles: World War II
- Rank: Captain, United States Army Air Forces

Joseph John "Tym" Tymczyszyn (August 12, 1918 – February 19, 1999) was an American World War II pilot, and test pilot for the United States Army Air Corps and the Federal Aviation Administration.

== Early life and education ==
He was born in Wilkes Barre, Pennsylvania in 1918, the second son of Polish immigrants Anna and Tadeusz Tymczyszyn who lived and worked in the coal mines near his home in eastern Pennsylvania.

Tymczyszyn became an instructor for the Civilian Pilot Training Corps, teaching college students to fly in anticipation of war. He served as an instructor pilot and engineering pilot in the Pacific during World War II, flying the North American P-51 Mustang and Lockheed P-38 Lightning.

After the war, he settled in Kirkland, Washington and attended the University of Washington, Tymczyszyn received his Bachelor of Science degree in Aeronautical Engineering in 1948.

== Test pilot ==
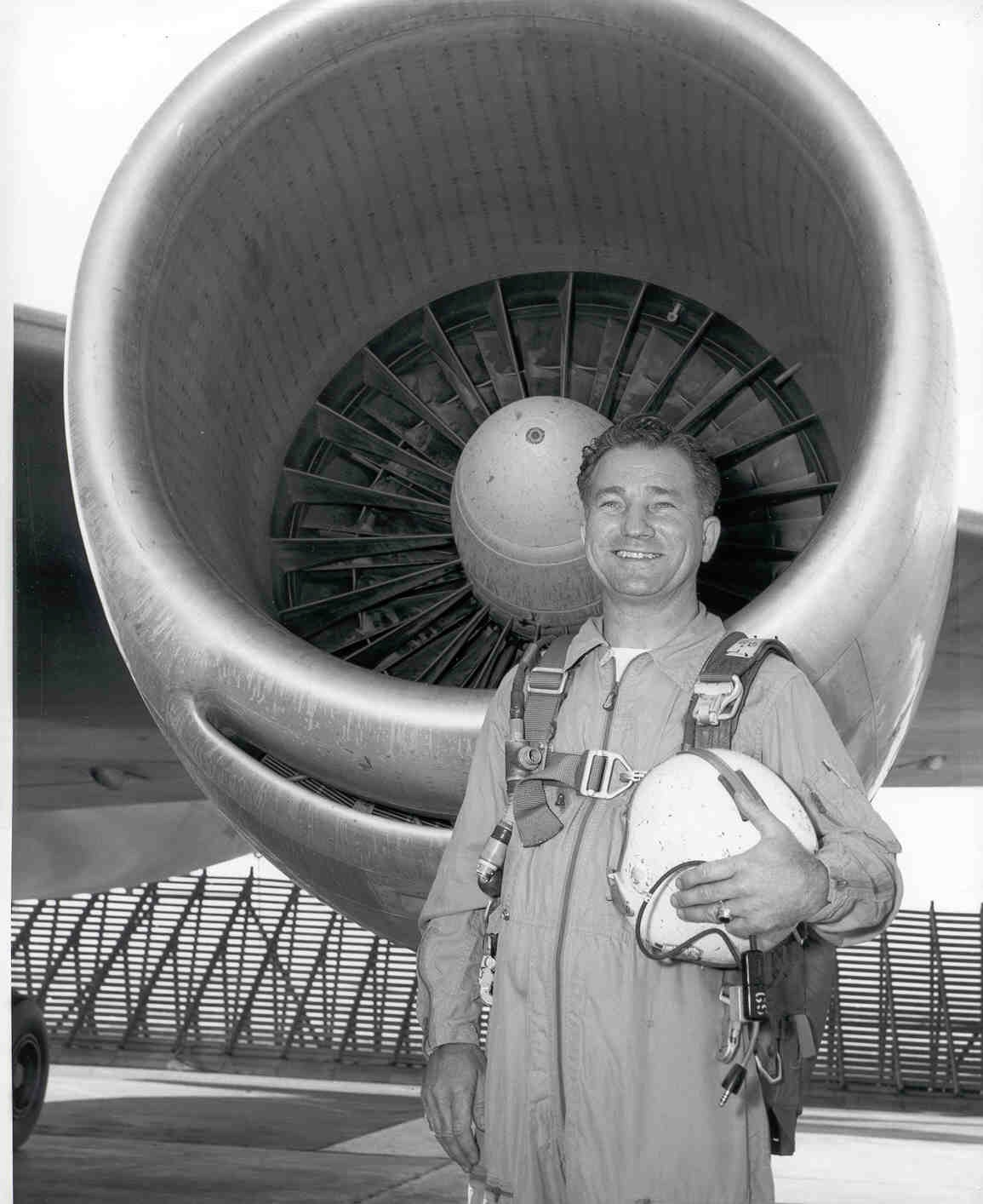
Tymczyszyn standing in front of the jet intake of the Douglas DC-8, circa 1958

After graduation, Tymczyszyn joined the Civil Aeronautics Authority (Precursor to the Federal Aviation Administration) and attended the U.S. Air Force Test Pilot School. The major milestones of his flight test achievements resulted from flights at Edwards Air Force Base. He flight tested the Boeing 707, Boeing 747, the Douglas DC-6 through to 10, the Convair 340 through 990, all Lockheed Constellation models, and the Electra. He tested hundreds of general aviation aircraft, and certified the Robinson R22 helicopter.

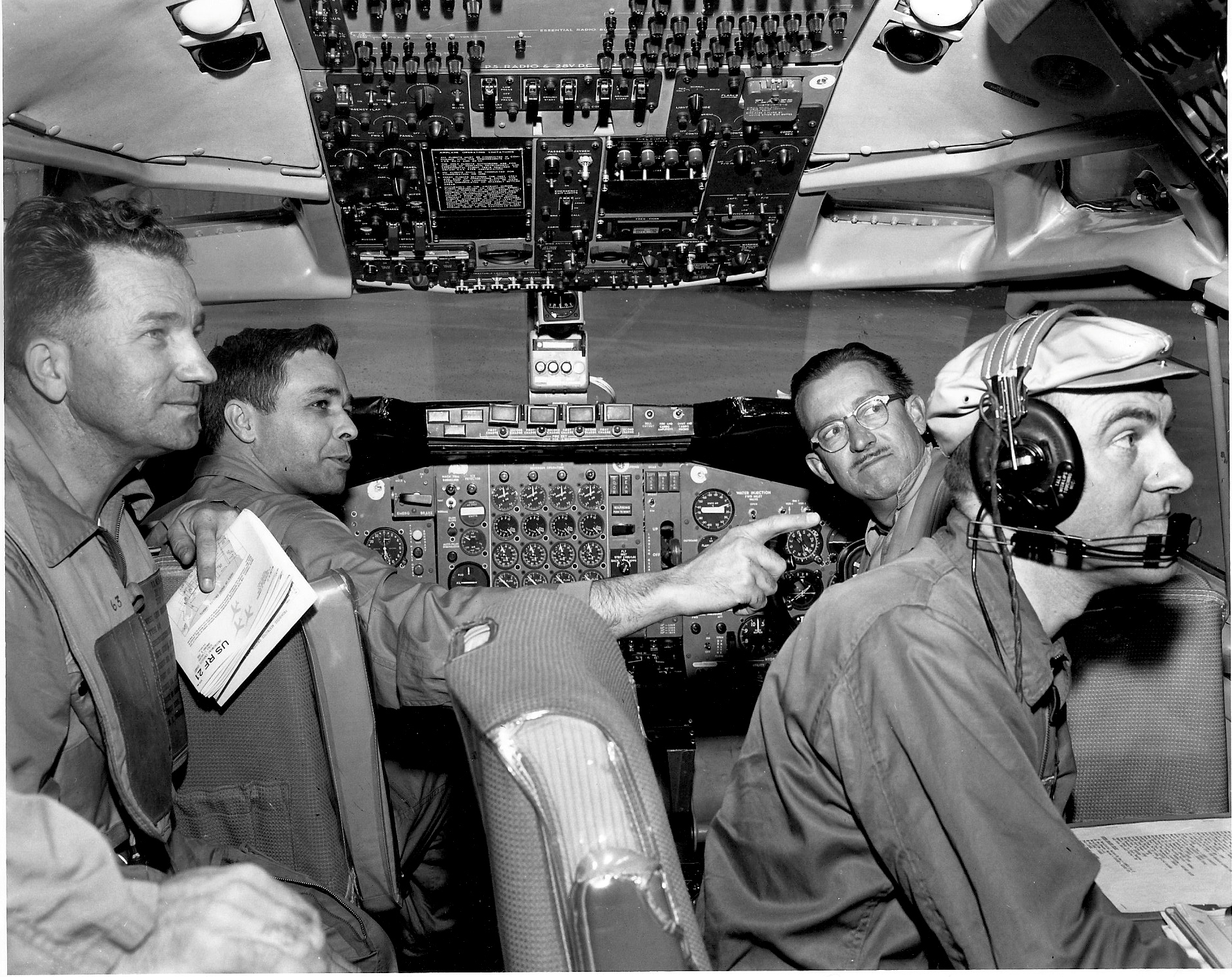
Members of the joint FAA and Boeing team performing test flight on the Boeing 707 during certification process on April 15, 1958. From left to right: Joseph John "Tym" Tymczyszyn (FAA), Lew Wallich (Boeing), unknown, unknown.

Federal Aviation Agency test pilot Joe Tymczyszyn displays models of Lockheed L-2000, top, and Boeing 2707, bottom, supersonic transport planes - Publication: Los Angeles Times - July 14, 1964.

Tymczyszyn is most recognized as the Test Pilot on America's first jet transport, the Boeing 707. He later flew into the wake turbulence of various aircraft and helicopters to determine safe separation distance between various aircraft. He was the eighth president of the Society of Experimental Test Pilots (SETP). Tymczyszyn helped found the SETP's Scholarship Foundation, the primary purpose of the scholarship being to provide educational assistance to children of deceased or disabled Society members.

Tymczyszyn is survived by his five sons, eight grandchildren and two great-grandchildren.

== Honors ==
Command pilot

Tymczyszyn received the first SETP Iven C. Kincheloe Award with James Gannett for flight testing the Boeing 707 and Douglas DC-8. In 1959 he also received the Octave Chanute Award from the American Institute of Aeronautics and Astronautics, Richard Hansford Burroughs Flight Safety Award, Flight Safety Foundation Award, and Aviation Week & Space Technology Laurels. In 1976 he was awarded the Aviation Week & Space Technology Distinguished Service Award.

In 2004, he was posthumously inducted into the Aerospace Walk of Honor, which celebrates test pilots who were associated with Edwards AFB for distinguished aviation careers marked by significant and obvious achievements beyond one specific accomplishment. In 2014 Tymczyszyn was posthumously inducted onto the Flight Path Museum "aviation walk of fame" on Sepulveda Boulevard at the Northeast corner of Los Angeles International Airport.
