= Aerospace Walk of Honor =

Coordinates: 34.698693°N 118.136669°W

- Description: Awards recognizing the important contributions of unique and talented aviators and test pilots
- Country: United States
- Presented by: City of Lancaster
- Status: Concluded

The Aerospace Walk of Honor in Lancaster, California, US, honors test pilots who have contributed to aviation and space research and development.

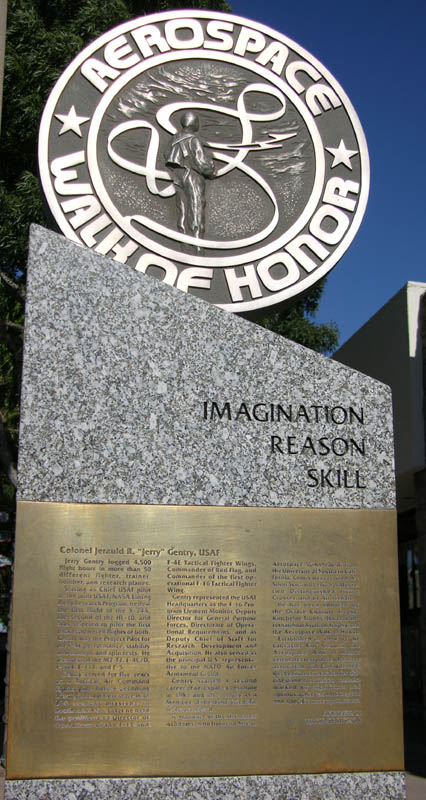
Monument to Jerry Gentry

The Aerospace Walk of Honor awards were established in 1990 by the City of Lancaster "to recognize the important contributions of unique and talented aviators who soared above the rest." Lancaster is located in the Antelope Valley, near four flight test facilities: US Air Force Plant 42, Edwards AFB, Mojave Air and Space Port and Naval Air Weapons Station China Lake. The Walk of Honor program officially concluded in August 2009.

The Walk of Honor is located on Lancaster Boulevard between Sierra Highway to the east and 10th Street West and is anchored by Boeing Plaza, which has a restored F-4 Phantom II on display. Honorees are memorialized with granite monuments located along Lancaster Boulevard. Test pilots who receive awards were inducted annually in late summer.

The Walk of Honor monuments and activities are funded by several aerospace companies, including Boeing, Lockheed Martin and Northrop Grumman, all of which perform flight test operations in the Antelope Valley.

== Inductees ==
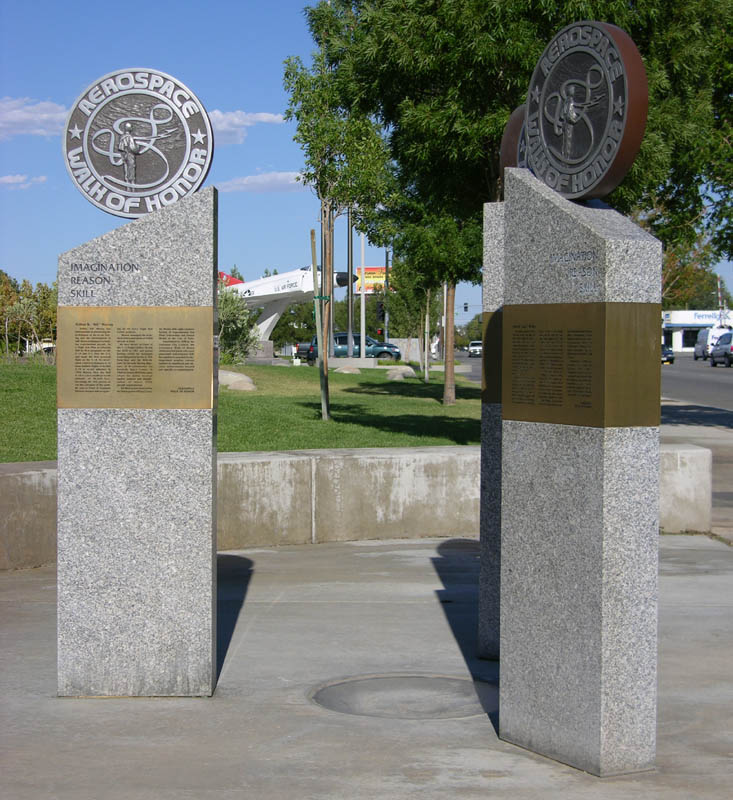
Three of the monuments in front of the Sheriff's station

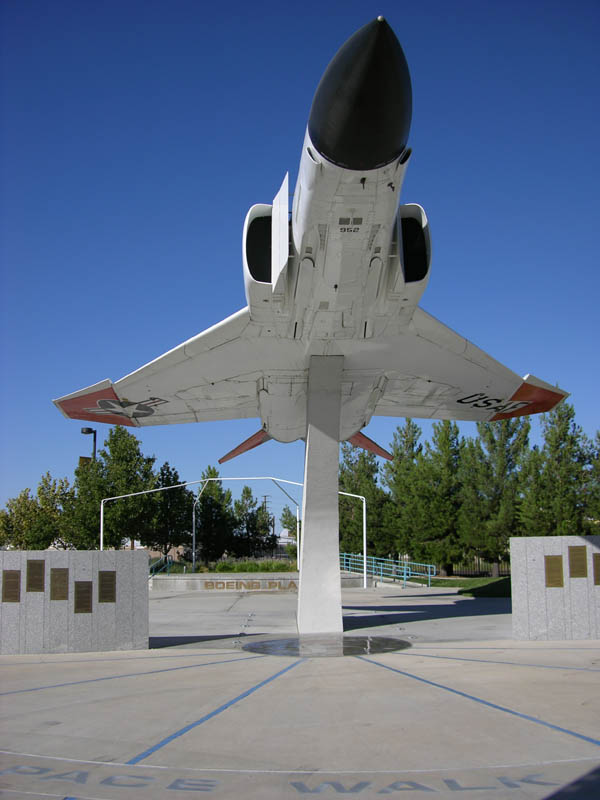
Boeing Plaza, Aerospace Walk of Honor

(Alphabetical, with year of induction)

- Clarence E. "Bud" Anderson, 1993
- Harry Andonian, 2009
- Neil Armstrong, 1991
- Fred J. Ascani, MGen USAF, 1999
- Frank T. Birk, 2001
- Charles C. "Charlie" Bock, Jr., 1994
- Albert Boyd, 1991
- Irving L. Burrows, 2008
- Stanley P. "Stan" Butchart, 1999
- Robert L. Cardenas, 1995
- Marion E. Carl, 1992
- Henry E. "Hank" Chouteau, 1996
- Jacqueline Cochran, 2006
- Eileen Collins, 2008
- Michael Collins, 2008
- Gordon Cooper, 2008
- Joseph F. Cotton, 1997
- Robert Crippen, 2007
- Albert Scott Crossfield, 1990
- William H. Dana, 1993
- James H. Doolittle, 1990
- Gordon Fullerton, 1936-2013 TBA
- James D. Eastham, 2003
- Glen W. Edwards, 1995
- Joe H. Engle, 1992
- Robert C. Ettinger, 2007
- Mervin L. Evenson, Colonel, USAF, 2006
- Frank Kendall Everest, Jr, 1991
- John A. Fergione, 2009
- David L. "Ferg" Ferguson, 1998
- Fitzhugh L. "Fitz" Fulton, Jr., 1991
- Jerauld R. "Jerry" Gentry, 1993
- John H. Griffith, 2006
- Fred W. Haise, 1995
- Lt. Col. Bruce Hinds, USAF, 1999
- Robert A. "Bob" Hoover, 1992
- Jesse P. "Jake" Jacobs, Jr., 1996
- Richard L. "Dick" Johnson, 1998
- Iven Carl Kincheloe, Jr., 1992
- William J. Knight, 1990
- Fred D. Knox, Jr., 2006
- Tony LeVier, 1990
- Maj. Wallace A. "Wally" Lien, 2005
- John A. Manke, 1997
- James McDivitt, 2009
- John B. "Jack" McKay, 1996
- Thomas C. McMurtry, 1998
- Corwin H. "Corky" Meyer, 1999
- Arthur K. "Kit" Murray, 1997
- Lewis A. Nelson, 2007
- William C. Park, 1995
- Bruce Peterson, 2003
- Robert O. "Bob" Rahn, 1994
- Jack Ridley, 1996
- Colonel Joseph W. Rogers, USAF, 2004
- Robert A. "Bob" Rushworth, 1994
- Herman Richard "Fish" Salmon, 1994
- Louis W. "Lou" Schalk, 1999
- Joe Schiele, 2008
- Edward T. Schneider, 2005
- Wendell H. "Wendy" Shawler, 1998
- Max R. Stanley, 1993
- Robert L. "Silver Fox" Stephens, 1998
- Emil Sturmthal, Colonel, USAF, 2006
- Richard G. Thomas, 2005
- Milton O. Thompson, 1993
- Guy M. Townsend, 1995
- Charles Tucker, 2007
- Joseph John "Tym" Tymczyszyn, 2004
- Joseph A. Walker, 1991
- George Welch, 2007
- Alvin S. "Al" White, 1994
- Robert M. "Bob" White, 1992
- Jack Fraser Woodman, 2009
- Chuck Yeager, 1990
- Jean L. "Skip" Ziegler, 2009

== See also ==
- North American aviation halls of fame
- List of halls and walks of fame
