= James H. Doolittle Award =

- The Doolittle Trophy
- Awarded for: Outstanding technical management or engineering
- Location: Lancaster, California
- Country: United States
- Presented by: The Society of Experimental Test Pilots and Boeing
- First award: 1966
- Website: SETP

The James H. Doolittle Award is an honor presented annually by the Society of Experimental Test Pilots. It is an award for "outstanding accomplishment in technical management or engineering achievement in aerospace technology". The award consists of a perpetual trophy on permanent display at SETP headquarters, and a smaller replica presented to the recipient. It is named after General James Doolittle, famous for the Doolittle Raid on Tokyo during World War II.

The Doolittle Trophy is a bronze form melding an aerodynamic shape, a stylized spacecraft, and a winged human figure. The aerodynamic shape stands for the scientists and engineers who provide technological breakthroughs. The spacecraft represents continued growth of the aerospace industry. The human figure represents the pilot who guides the test effort to reach its goals. A helmet and goggles rest on the base of the trophy symbolizing the tools of the early test pilot and Jimmy Doolittle himself. Plaques bearing the name of each honoree are mounted around the sides of the teak base.

== Criteria ==
The Society lists three criteria for nominations to this award:

1. The recipient must be a living member of the Society
2. A significant phase of the accomplishment must have occurred while a member of the Society
3. The accomplishment must clearly be in the technical management or engineering aspects of aerospace technology

== Recipients ==
Recipients of the SETP J. H. Doolittle Award include:

- 1966 - James L. Pearce
- 1967 - Richard W. Taylor
- 1968 - William Paul Thayer
- 1969 - Guy M. Townsend, BGen., USAF (Ret)
- 1970 - William M. Magruder
- 1971 - C. H. Meyer
- 1972 - Donald K. Slayton, NASA/MSC
- 1973 - William S. Ross, McDonnell Aircraft Company
- 1974 - William R. Murray
- 1975 - Robert A. Rushworth, Major General, USAF
- 1976 - Frank Borman
- 1977 - Robert C. Little
- 1978 - William R. Laidlaw
- 1979 - Thomas P. Stafford, LGen., USAF
- 1980 - J. Lynn Helms
- 1981 - Thomas B. Hayward, Admiral, USN
- 1982 - Allen E. Paulson
- 1983 - Herbert Z. Hopkins
- 1984 - Donald D. Engen, VAdm, USN (Ret)
- 1985 - Olle Klinker
- 1986 - Hon. John E. Krings
- 1987 - Burt Rutan, Scaled Composites
- 1988 - Richard H. Truly, Rear Admiral, USN
- 1989 - Irving L. Burrows
- 1990 - Robert P. Harper
- 1991 - Gordon E. Fornell, LGen., USAF
- 1992 - William C. Bowes, Vadm., USN and Peter W. Odgers, MGen, USAF (Ret)
- 1993 - A. W. "Tony" LeVier
- 1994 - Per E. Pellebergs
- 1995 - Stephan A. Hanvey
- 1996 - Sean C. Roberts, National Test Pilot School
- 1997 - Frank D. Robinson
- 1998 - J. Kenneth Higgins
- 1999 - Pete Reynolds
- 2000 - Sir Charles Masefield
- 2001 - Joseph Wendell Dyer, Jr., Vice Admiral (USN) / NASA / iRobot
- 2002 - Phil Schultz
- 2003 – Rogers E. Smith, EADS
- 2004 – Burt Rutan
- 2005 - Robert C. Ettinger, Northrop Grumman Unmanned Systems
- 2006 - Terry E. Tomeny, Eclipse Aviation
- 2007 - Robert L. Crippen
- 2008 - M. Lynn Hanks, Army Technical Test Center
- 2009 - Louis H. Knotts, Calspan Corporation
- 2010 - Dennis P. O'Donoghue, The Boeing Company
- 2011 - Joseph E. Sweeney, Lockheed Martin
- 2012 - Doug Shane, Scaled Composites
- 2013 - Charles T. Burbage, Lockheed Martin
- 2014 - George E. Cooper, Charter Member
- 2015 - Harold R. Gaston, Gulfstream Aerospace
- 2016 - Jeffrey A. Wieringa, The Boeing Company
- 2017 - William Gray, U.S. Air Force Test Pilot School
- 2018 - Mike Carriker, The Boeing Company
- 2019 - Douglas A. Benjamin, The Boeing Company (Ret)
- 2020 - Dr. Allen L. Peterson, National Test Pilot School
- 2021 - Bruce Remick, Federal Aviation Administration (Ret)
- 2022 - Robert D. Cabana, NASA
- 2023 - Kelly Latimer, Virgin Galactic
- 2024 - Michael Masucci, Virgin Galactic
- 2025 - Giorgio Clementi, ITPS Canada
- 2026 - Greg Morris, Scaled Composites

== See also ==
- List of aviation awards
