= Herman Salmon =

American test pilot

- Born: Herman Richard Koerner Salmon; 11 July 1913; Milwaukee, Wisconsin, United States
- Died: 22 June 1980 (aged 66); Columbus, Indiana, United States
- Other name: Fish
- Occupation: Test pilot
- Known for: Barnstorming, Air racing

Herman Richard Salmon (July 11, 1913 – June 22, 1980), nicknamed "Fish", was a barnstormer, air racer, and test pilot for the Lockheed Corporation.

== Biography ==
=== Early life ===
Salmon was born in 1913 in Milwaukee, Wisconsin, to Pennsylvania-born engineer Harry Britton Salmon and his wife Bertha Wilhelmine née Wagner. His first flight in an aircraft was at the age of 14; by 18 he was a licensed pilot. During the 1930s he flew as a barnstormer, parachute stuntman and race pilot. By 1940 he was living in Los Angeles, California with his first wife Evelyn.

=== Lockheed ===
He started work at Lockheed in 1940 ferrying Hudsons to Montreal for the Royal Air Force. In 1945, he was transferred to the engineering test piloting division by Tony LeVier, who was the new head of the department.

As engineering test pilot, he spin tested the P-38 Lightning and dive tested the P-80 Shooting Star, the XF-90 penetration fighter prototype, and the F-94C Starfire. He certification tested two of the models of the Constellation for the Civil Aeronautics Administration. He made the first flights of such aircraft as the L-188 Electra, P-3 Orion, YF-104A Starfighter, and the XFV-1 tailsitter, which was named in his honor. He succeeded Tony LeVier as chief engineering test pilot, until he retired from Lockheed in 1978.

=== The Goodyear Trophy air races, 1947-1949 ===
A new class of air racing was introduced at the 1947 National Air Races in Cleveland, Ohio, sponsored for three years by the Goodyear corporation. The first year Herman achieved a third place flying a Cosmic Wind plane with a speed of 158.8 mph (256 km/h). The Cosmic Wind was designed and built by a group of Lockheed employees, including Tony LeVier. In 1948 Herman finished first, and in 1949 fifth.

=== Later years ===
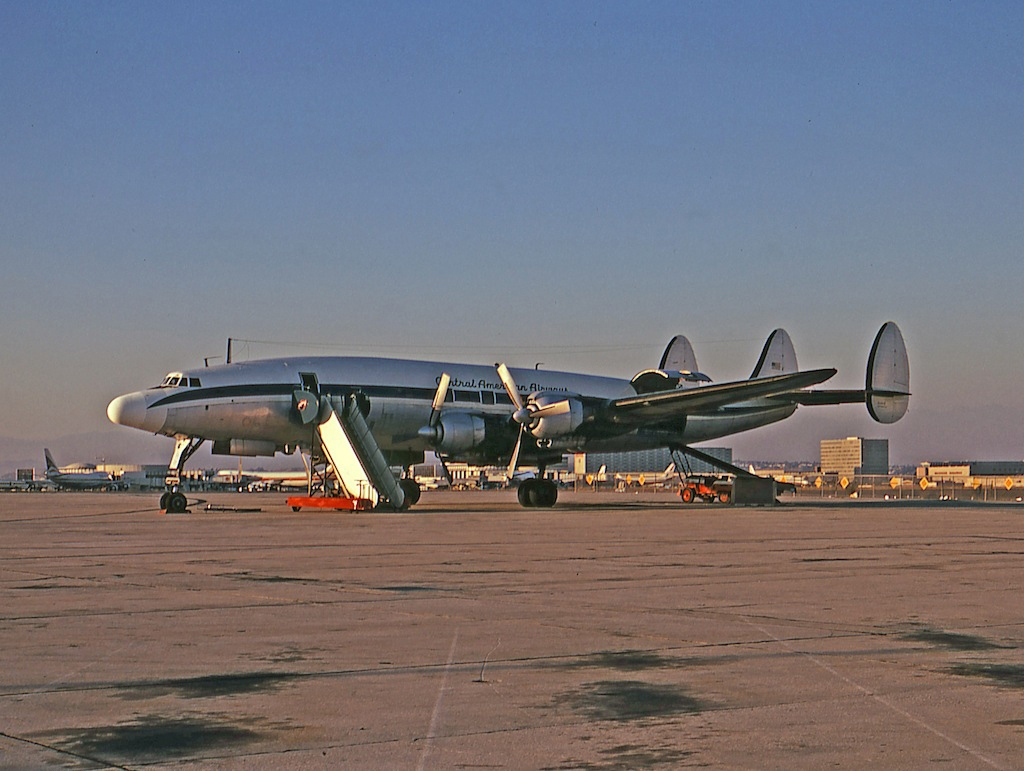
N74CA, the aircraft in which Salmon died. Central American sold N74CA on May 15, 1980, the crash occurred June 22

In 1968, Salmon was the recipient of the coveted Kitty Hawk Memorial Award for distinguished achievement as a test pilot.

Salmon continued to teach flight crew and ferry aircraft. In 1974 he flew as a passenger on the maiden flight of the then-recently restored Westland Lysander piloted and owned by Dwight Brooks.

In 1980, he was killed in Lockheed L-1049H Super Constellation N74CA that he was ferrying to Alaska, when it crashed on take off from Bakalar municipal airport in Columbus, Indiana. Also killed in the crash were flight engineer Leland J. Sanders and a passenger. Five others survived the crash including Salmon's son and copilot, Randall.

Herman Salmon had logged about 17,250 flight hours.

In 1994, he was inducted into the Aerospace Walk of Honor.

== Herman R. Salmon Technical Publications Award ==
Since 1971 the Society of Experimental Test Pilots, of which Salmon was a Fellow, has made an annual award "to recognize the most outstanding technical paper published in Cockpit magazine". The selection criteria include:

- Contribution to flight testing
- Contribution to the exchange of information between test pilots that would not otherwise be generally available.

== See also ==
- Herman
- Herman R. Salmon Technical Publications Award
- List of accidents and incidents involving the Lockheed Constellation
- List of aviators by nickname
- Salmon (surname)
