= Iven C. Kincheloe Award =

- Iven C. Kincheloe Trophy
- Awarded for: Outstanding flight testing
- Location: Lancaster, California
- Country: United States
- Presented by: The Society of Experimental Test Pilots
- First award: 1958
- Website: SETP

The Iven C. Kincheloe Award recognizes outstanding professional accomplishment in the conduct of flight testing. It was established in 1958 by the Society of Experimental Test Pilots in memory of test pilot and Korean War ace Iven C. Kincheloe, United States Air Force, who died during flight testing.

The Kincheloe Trophy consists of four columns and a symbolic aerospace vehicle that points toward the shield of the society. The columns represent the foundation on which the society was founded: courage, integrity, knowledge and accomplishment. The vehicle reinforces the role played by the society in the development of aerospace systems. Plaques bearing the name of each honoree are mounted around the sides of the onyx base.

== Criteria ==
The Society lists three criteria for nominations to this award:

1. The recipient must be a living member of the Society.
2. The accomplishment, or significant portion of the accomplishment, must have occurred in the past year (From July 1)
3. The accomplishment must involve flight testing conducted by the individual, while in a test pilot role, and represent an outstanding contribution to an aerospace program.

== Recipients ==
Recipients of this award, from 1958 to present, include:

- 1958
  - James R. Gannett, Boeing First Commercial Jet
  - Joseph John "Tym" Tymczyszyn, CAA First Commercial Jet
- 1959
  - Robert G. Ferry, Maj USAF, XV-3 convertiplane
- 1960
  - A. Scott Crossfield, North American X-15 Program
  - William M. Magruder, Douglas DC-8 Flight Test Program
- 1961
  - Joseph A. Walker, NASA X-15 Program
  - Robert M. White, Maj USAF, NASA X-15 Program
- 1962
  - Donald W. McCracken, McDonnell F-4 Mach Investigation
- 1963
  - Astronaut Team, NASA Mercury Program
    - M. Scott Carpenter, LCDR USN
    - L. Gordon Cooper, Maj USAF
    - John H. Glenn, Jr. Lt Col USMC
    - Virgil I. Grissom, Capt USAF
    - Walter M. Schirra, CDR USN
    - Alan B. Shepard, CDR USN
    - Donald K. Slayton, Maj USAF
- 1964
  - Pilots of YF12A (A-11) Lockheed Super-Secret Project
    - Louis W. Schalk
    - William C. Park
    - Robert J. Gilliland
    - James D. Eastham
- 1965
  - Alvin S. White, North American XB-70 Supersonic Flight
- 1966
  - Milton Orville Thompson, NASA M2/F2-Lifting Body Program
- 1967
  - Richard L. Johnson, for the General Dynamics F-111 test Program
- 1968
  - Drury W. Wood, Jr, Dornier Werke DO31 Test Program-VTOL Flight
- 1969
  - Jerauld R. Gentry, Maj USAF, NASA/FRC Lifting Body Program
  - James A. McDivitt, Col USAF/NASA Apollo IX Mission, test of LM maneuvering
- 1970
  - Darryl G. Greenamyer, Lockheed World speed record for piston engine airplane
  - Apollo 11 Team Moon landing and return
    - Neil A. Armstrong NASA
    - Edwin E. Aldrin, Col USAF/NASA
    - Michael Collins, Col USAF/NASA
- 1971
  - Andre Turcat, Aerospatiale, Concorde joint test program
  - Brian Trubshaw, British Aircraft Corporation, Concorde joint test program
- 1972
  - Apollo XVI Crew Moon landing and return
    - John W. Young, CAPT USN, NASA
    - Thomas K. Mattingly CDR USN/NASA
    - Charles M. Duke, Lt Col USAF/NASA
  - Donald R. Segner, Lockheed-California For accomplishments in Company testing the Cheyenne helicopter
- 1973
  - Charles A. Sewell, Grumman Aerospace Spin Prevention Testing in a Grumman F-14A Tomcat.
- 1974
  - Irving L. Burrows, McDonnell Aircraft Outstanding professional Company contributions as a test pilot during F15A development program
- 1975
  - John E. Krings, McDonnell Aircraft As Project Pilot on F15A Company high angle of attack characteristics test program
- 1976
  - Charles C. Bock, Jr, Rockwell International For his outstanding accomplishments on the B-1 Program
- 1977
  - Fitzhugh L. Fulton, Jr, NASA/Dryden Flight 747/Space Shuttle Carrier Research Center
- 1978
  - James M. Patton Jr, NASA/Langley Research Stall/Spin Flight Research Center
  - Fred W. Haise, Jr, NASA/JSC Space Shuttle
  - Joe H. Engle, Col, USAF
  - Charles Fullerton, Lt Col USAF
  - Richard H. Truly, CDR USN
- 1979
  - Philip F. Oestricher, General Dynamics Corp. F-16 Flight Test Program
  - Robert C. Ettinger, Lt Col USAF
- 1980
  - Dorman A. Cannon, Bell Helicopter Textron Tilt Rotor XV-15
  - Ronald G. Erhart, Bell Helicopter Textron
- 1981
  - John W. Young, NASA Space Shuttle Columbia
  - Robert L. Crippen, CAPT USN
- 1982
  - Thomas McMurtry, NASA AD-1 Oblique Wing Program
- 1983
  - John M. Hoffman, Lt Col USAF For Outstanding contribution to the derivative F-15 fighter planes
- 1984
  - Donald L. Bloom, Bell Helicopter OH-58C helicopter spin phenomena
  - Charles A. Sewell, Grumman Aerospace Low Altitude high angle Corporation of attack, asymmetric thrust flight test program on the F-14 Tomcat.
- 1985
  - William W. Lowe, McDonnell Douglas AV-8B High Angle of Attack Corporation Test Program
- 1986
  - David A. Kerzie, Lockheed Corp. U-2/TR-1 extremely high altitude investigative and exploratory flights to determine flutter characteristics.
- 1987
  - Guy Mitaux-Maurouard, Avions Marcel Dassault Rafale Flight Test Program
  - Dick Rutan, Voyager Aircraft, Inc. Successful around-the-world non-stop, non-refueled flight of the Voyager aircraft
  - Jeana Yeager, Voyager Aircraft, Inc.
- 1988
  - Channing S. Morse, McDonnell Douglas NOTAR Helicopter, Helicopter Company Development Program
- 1989
  - Addison S. Thompson, Rockwell International B-1B high alpha envelope
  - Randy Gaston, Lt Col USAF, expansion and flight control system development
  - William C. Park, Jr, Lockheed Aircraft Corp. Research and development
  - N. Kenneth Dyson, Lt Col USAF, flights of prototype
- 1990
  - Bruce J. Hinds, Jr. Northrop Corporation B-2 Flight Test Program
  - Richard S. Couch, Col USAF
- 1991
  - Paul Metz, Northrop Corporation YF-23 ATF Prototype
  - David L. Ferguson, Lockheed Corporation YF-22 ATF Prototype
- 1992
  - Daniel C. Brandenstein, CAPT USN Space Shuttle/Satellite Recovery
- 1993
  - Allan T. Reed, McDonnell Douglas T-45 High Angle of Attack and Corporation Flying Qualities & Spin Evaluation
- 1994
  - Christopher J. Yeo, British Aerospace Eurofighter 2000 Flight Test
  - Peter Weger, Deutsche Aerospace Program
- 1995
  - John E. Cashman, The Boeing Company 777 Flight Test Program
- 1996
  - Erwin Danuwinata, IPTN Expansion and flight tests leading to FAA/JAA certification
  - Ken Dyson & Richard G. Thomas, Tacit Blue Program (Retroactive 1982)
  - Jon S. Beesley, USAF F-117 Combined Test Force, Harold C. Farley Lockheed, David L. Ferguson Lockheed & Thomas A. Morgenfeld Lockheed (Retroactive 1983)
- 1997
  - Douglas B. Shane, Scaled Composites V-Jet II and Vision Aire Vantage
- 1998
  - Gary Freeman, Gulfstream Aerospace G-V Certification Test Program
- 1999
  - Mike Melvill, Scaled Composites Proteus high-altitude multimission aircraft
- 2000
  - Jeremy Tracy, GKN Westland Helicopters
- 2001
  - Wg Cdr Rajiv Kothiyal, Indian AF
- 2002
  - Herb Moran Bell Helicopter, envelope expansion and aircraft definition of the AH-1Z helicopter.
- 2003
  - Thomas L. Macdonald, Bell-Boeing High Rate of Descent (HROD) testing for the V-22 Osprey
- 2004
  - Scaled Composites SpaceShipOne Test Team
    - Mike Melvill
    - Brian Binnie
    - Peter Siebold
- 2005
  - Randy Neville, Boeing F-22
- 2006
  - Norman E. Howell, Boeing, C-17
- 2007
  - Jon S. Beesley, Lockheed Martin, F-35A and Bird of Prey Test Team (Retroactive from 1997)
  - Rudy Haug, Boeing
  - Doug Benjamin, Boeing
  - Joe Felock, Boeing
- 2008
  - Terry E. Tomeny, Calspan Corporation Eclipse
- 2009
  - Peter Siebold, Scaled Composites
- 2010
  - Michael Carriker, Boeing
- 2011
  - Kevin Bredenbeck, Sikorsky Aircraft, X2 Demonstrator
- 2012
  - Markus Scherdel, Solar Impulse, HB-SIA
- 2013
  - Mark "Forger" Stucky, Scaled Composites Test Pilot for SpaceShipTwo and WhiteKnightTwo
- 2014
  - AgustaWestland AW609 Tiltrotor Test Team
    - Pietro Venanzi
    - Dan Wells
    - Paul Edwards
- 2015
  - Prospero Uybarreta, Bombardier Commercial Aircraft, C Series and CRJ Series
- 2016
  - Scott Martin, Gulfstream Aerospace, GVII-G500/G600
- 2017
  - Charles Ellis, Bombardier Flight Test Center, Bombardier CSeries
- 2018
  - James Payne, Airbus Perlan Project
- 2019
  - Evan C. Thomas, Scaled Composites, LLC., Stratolaunch Aircraft
- 2020
  - Tom Carr, Garmin, Garmin Emergency Autoland (EAL)
- 2021
  - Donald Grove, Bell Textron, V-280 Demonstrator Program
- 2022
  - Benjamin Williamson, Sikorsky, A Lockheed Martin Company, S-70 Optionally Piloted Vehicle
- 2023
  - Steven Crane, Eviation, Alice V2 Aircraft
- 2024
  - William Shoemaker, Boom Supersonic, XB-1 Program
- 2025
  - Tristan Brandenburg, Boom Supersonic, XB-1 Program
- 2026
  - David Nils Larson, NASA, X 59 Quiet Supersonic Technology (QueSST) Demonstrator

== See also ==
- List of aviation awards
