= Tony LeVier Flight Test Safety Award =

Aviation prize

- Tony LeVier Trophy
- Awarded for: Contribution to flight test safety
- Location: Lancaster, California
- Country: United States
- Presented by: The Society of Experimental Test Pilots; Gentex Corporation
- First award: 1999
- Website: SETP

The Tony LeVier Flight Test Safety Award, named in honor of test pilot Tony LeVier, was established by the Flight Test Safety Committee to pay recognition to people who have significantly contributed to the safety of flight test operations. This annual award, which can be presented to an individual or team is presented by Gentex Corporation at the Flight Test Safety Committee's North American Flight Test Safety Workshop in the spring of each year.

To be considered for the award, nominees must have contributed in a significant way to the flight test safety community over a period of time. The nominee must have made a singular safety achievement involved in the saving of human life, a flight test program or test aircraft, and may be nominated only where safety rules were not broken.

== Past recipients ==
Recipients of the SETP Tony LeVier Flight Test Safety Award include:

- 1999 – Eric E. Fiore, Bombardier Aerospace
- 2000 – Rodrigo J. Huete, FAA
- 2001 – David Houle, Former President of SFTE
- 2002 – Bruce A. Peterson
- 2003 – Auto ACAS Team
- 2004 – LCDR William Patton, Aviation Safety Officer and Program Manager and Mr. Thomas Roberts, Research, Development, Test, and Evaluation Safety Manager, Naval Test Wing Atlantic (NTWL) Safety Office
- 2005 – Ralph Mohr, The Boeing Company
- 2006 - Terry White
- 2007 - John E. Cashman
- 2008 - Flight Test Safety Database Team: Barton Henwood, NASA/DFRC; Rodrigo Huete, FAA (Ret); John Hed, FAA; Greg Lewis, National Test Pilot School
- 2009 - Jerry “Mac” McCawley, Lockheed Martin
- 2010 - Dave Downey
- 2011 - Thomas Roberts
- 2012 - The Boeing Company 787 Flight Test Team: Mike Carriker, Randy Neville, Jennifer-Ellen Gessler; Federal Aviation Administration 787 Flight Test Team: Eugene Arnold and John Hed
- 2013 - Art Tomassetti
- 2014 - Terry Lutz, Airbus
- 2015 - Larry Flynn, Gulfstream Aerospace
- 2016 - Warren A. Hansen, Textron Aviation
- 2017 - Mark Skoog, NASA Armstrong Flight Research Center
- 2018 - Terrance Pearce, Bombardier Aerospace
- 2019 - Barbara Gordon, U.S. Naval Test Pilot School and LT Mark Hargrove, USN
- 2020 - Darren McDonald, The Boeing Company
- 2021 - Ben Luther, Nova Systems
- 2022 - Giorgio Clementi, ITPS Canada
- 2023 - Jonathan Lindsey & Michael Remaly, The Boeing Company
- 2024 - MSgt Joshua Thorn, USAF, TSgt Christopher Schiller, USAF, Matthew Toppin, MTSI
- 2025 - Chris Glaeser, Cirrus Aircraft
- 2026 - Tarik Turkmen, Markus Scherdel, Stepen Stepen, Dornier Seawings

== See also ==
- List of aviation awards

== See also ==
- Flight Test Safety Committee Page
- SETP Criteria
- Recipient List
