= Society of Experimental Test Pilots =

International non-governmental organization

- Society of Experimental Test Pilots insigne
- Abbreviation: SETP
- Formation: September 14, 1955; 71 years ago
- Location: Lancaster, California, United States
- Region served: Worldwide
- President: William Koyama
- Website: SETP

The Society of Experimental Test Pilots is an international organization that seeks to promote air safety and contributes to aeronautical advancement by promoting sound aeronautical design and development; interchanging ideas, thoughts and suggestions of the members, assisting in the professional development of experimental pilots, and providing scholarships and aid to members and the families of deceased members.

== History ==
Seventeen pilots attended the first organized meeting of the "Testy Test Pilots Society" on September 29, 1955. This name was to be short-lived, however, as it was changed to The Society of Experimental Test Pilots at the second meeting on October 13, 1955.

The first officers of the society were instated on October 25, 1955, and consisted of Ray Tenhoff, President; Scott Crossfield, Executive Adviser; Dick Johnson, Vice-President; Joe Ozier, Secretary; Lou Everett, Treasurer; and Al Blackburn, Legal Officer. Once the organization and bylaws were established, the society incorporated in the state of California on April 12, 1956. The insigne of the society was designed by C. A. "Al" McDaniel and officially adopted for use in 1956.

The first Awards Banquet was held on October 4, 1957, at the Beverly Hilton Hotel in Beverly Hills, California. It was at the second such banquet, however, that the tradition of the Iven C. Kincheloe Award began. This annual award honors the member who has done the most proficient test work during the previous year. James Gannett of Boeing and Joseph John "Tym" Tymczyszyn of the Civil Aeronautics Administration won the first Kincheloe Award for their work toward certification of America's first turbojet airliner' the Boeing 707. They have been followed each year by the most notable contributors to aviation history.

In 1969, Bob Hoover was president of the Society of Experimental Test Pilots (SETP), and he had been a personal friend of Charles Lindbergh since the early 1950s, when the reclusive Lindbergh was using the pseudonym "Mr Schwartz". Hoover persuaded Lindbergh to attend the SETP annual symposium and banquet at the Beverley Hilton, as his guest. At the top table, they were joined by Neil Armstrong, who had just been released from quarantine after the Apollo 11 mission. Hoover introduced both Lindbergh and Armstrong, to the surprise of the press and other attendees, and many photos were published of Hoover's wife Colleen flanked by both 'heroes' of aviation. The story of the occasion was later narrated by Hoover in the 2014 documentary film Flying the Feathered Edge: The Bob Hoover Project.

As of December 31, 2023, the Society had 2,479 members from various countries.

== Publications ==
The society publishes a quarterly known as Cockpit that contains technical articles on flight testing. In addition to Cockpit, the society publishes the proceedings of the annual symposium in Los Angeles to provide a permanent record of flight test progress reports. A periodic newsletter is also provided to members.

== Conferences ==
The Society holds a number of conferences annually:

- Los Angeles Symposium and Banquet
- West Coast Symposium
- East Coast Symposium
- Northwest Symposium
- European Symposium
- Southeast Symposium
- Central Symposium
- Great Lakes Symposium
- Southwest Symposium
- Flight Test Safety Workshop

== Awards ==
The Society annually presents a number of awards to recognize notable members of the flight test community. These are:

- Iven C. Kincheloe Award—Outstanding professional accomplishment in the conduct of flight testing
- James H. Doolittle Award—Outstanding accomplishment in technical management or engineering
- Tony LeVier Flight Test Safety Award—Significant achievement in flight test safety
- Herman R. Salmon Technical Publications Award—Outstanding technical paper published in Cockpit magazine
- Ray E. Tenhoff Award—Outstanding technical paper presented at the annual SETP symposium
- Jack Northrop Award—Outstanding technical paper presented at the annual SETP San Diego symposium
- Leroy Grumman Award—Outstanding technical paper presented at the annual SETP East Coast symposium
- Friend of the Society—Exceptional and notable contribution to the operation and the objectives of the Society
- Spirit of Flight—Significant contribution to the spirit, technology, manufacture, safety and flight test of home-built/sport/classic aircraft

== Scholarship foundation ==
In 1967, the Society created a foundation to provide for scholarships and other forms of educational assistance to children of deceased or disabled Society members. As of 2026, the scholarship foundation has granted over US$4.6 million in educational assistance to more than 191 students. Approximately 10 students per year attend school with Society assistance.

== Membership and member grades ==
Membership in the Society is divided into six grades:

1. Honorary Fellow (HF)—Distinction in the aerospace field and an experimental test pilot at some time during their career
2. Fellow (F)—Distinction in experimental flight testing and an Associate Fellow for at least one year
3. Associate Fellow (AF)—Association with experimental flight testing for ten years, experimental test pilot for five years, Member for at least two years
4. Member (M)—Experimental test pilot not less than one year or crewed space vehicle pilot
5. Associate Member (AM)—Experimental test pilot or co-pilot from between six months to two years depending on the type of testing
6. Corporate Member—Organization that has a common interest with the Society in the advancement of crewed aerospace

=== Criteria for membership ===
The American astronaut, Wally Schirra (1923–2007), had firm views on the criteria that should apply for membership of SETP, and on the definition of an astronaut. He devoted a whole chapter, My Ultimate Peer Group, of his autobiography, Schirra's Space, to a discussion of the subject.

I was a member of SETP before I joined the space program, for I had been an active test pilot. [...] You progress from member to associate fellow to fellow. That is the highest honor in your profession—to be named a fellow. [...] When a test pilot becomes a fellow, he has reached the peak of his career.

Schirra says that SETP is an exclusive society based on professional aviation skill and accomplishment rather than mere achievement of altitude:

I admit it—SETP is an exclusive society. I don't believe snobbery is involved at all, because professionalism is the criterion for acceptance. It has nothing to do with your ancestry or how you part your hair. We made a mistake, in my opinion, when we ruled that anyone who has flown at an altitude of fifty miles or higher is eligible for membership. Therefore, Walt Cunningham, who was on my Apollo 7 crew but is not a test pilot, is a member. This isn't intended as a dig at Walt. I just feel that society membership should be an emblem on a test pilot's sleeve. It should belong to him alone.

He argues that personnel not flying an aircraft or controlling the flight of a spacecraft are not aviators or astronauts:

My world as a test pilot is the fighter world. You don't see bombers in my inventory. [...] Before the shuttle—in Mercury, Gemini and Apollo—astronauts were aviators. [...] But then NASA began putting others on board, people they called mission and payload specialists. Now I think of them as similar to members of a bomber crew—a bombardier, a navigator. The specialists have important duties to perform, but they should not be confused with pilots. Nor should people who don't fly the spacecraft be called astronauts.

=== Notable members ===
The following is an incomplete list of notable individuals who are or were members of the society:
