= List of U.S. Air Force Test Pilot School alumni =

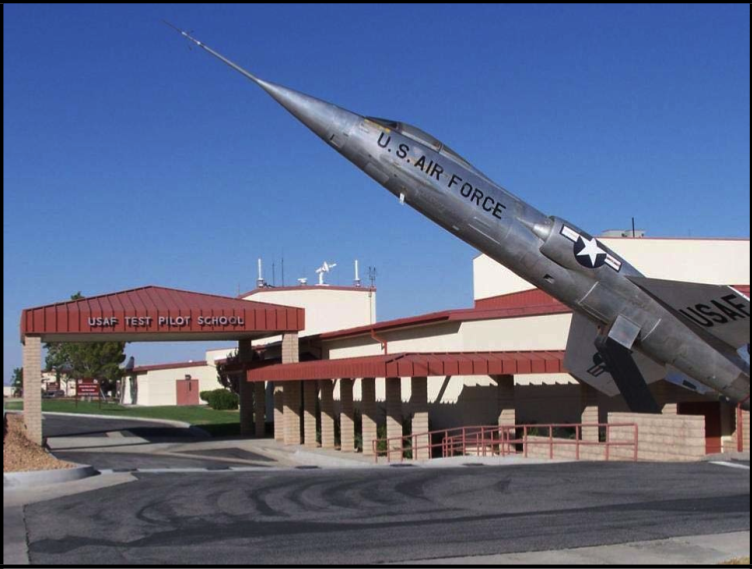
USAF Test Pilot School, Edwards AFB, California

The U.S. Air Force Test Pilot School (TPS) graduated the following notable alumni who made significant contributions to the aerospace field. The school's mission is to produce experimental test pilots, flight test engineers, and flight test navigators to lead and conduct test and evaluation of aerospace weapon systems. The school was established on September 9, 1944, as the Flight Test Training Unit at Wright-Patterson Air Force Base (AFB) in Dayton, Ohio. To take advantage of the uncongested skies and superb flying weather, the school was moved on February 4, 1951, to its present location at Edwards Air Force Base in the Mojave Desert of Southern California. Edwards AFB is the home of the Air Force Test Center and has been an integral part of flight testing since June 25, 1951.

Between 1962 and 1972, the Test Pilot School expanded its role to include astronaut training for military test pilots. Thirty-seven TPS graduates of this era were selected for the U.S. space program, and twenty-six went on to earn astronaut's wings by flying in the X-15, Gemini, Apollo, and Space Shuttle programs. Although the school no longer trains astronauts, many TPS graduates since 1972 have been selected by the National Aeronautics and Space Administration (NASA) for duties in space. The school encourages applications from civilians, personnel from other U.S. military services, and individuals from foreign countries. An exchange program allows selected students to attend other test pilot schools including the United States Naval Test Pilot School, the United Kingdom's Empire Test Pilots' School, and France's EPNER.

== Liethen-Tittle Award ==
The Liethen-Tittle Award is a prestigious honor presented to the top graduate of the U.S. Air Force Test Pilot School. The award honours Major Frank Liethen Jr, Class 61C, who lost his life flying with the Thunderbirds in 1966, and Major David Tittle, Class 55D, who lost his life testing the XC-5 VSTOL aircraft in 1966. The award is presented to the pilot in each class who achieves the best overall record for outstanding flying performance and academic excellence.

== Famous alumni ==
The following graduates of the USAF Test Pilot School are listed in the roles for which they are most notable. These roles include:

- Astronaut – Alumni who were trained by a human spaceflight program to command, pilot, or serve as a crew member of a spacecraft.
- Flight test – Alumni notable for their work in flight testing including the "Golden Age" of jet flight testing: 1948 to 1968.
- Military commander – Alumni who achieved notability as the commanding officer of a military unit.
- Author – Alumni who have authored books on flight test.

=== Key ===
Service
Service	RCAF	Royal Canadian Air Force
Service	USAF	United States Air Force
Service	USAFR	United States Air Force Reserve
Service	USN	United States Navy
Service	USNR	United States Navy Reserve
Service	USMC	United States Marine Corps
Service	Civilians	From specified U.S. contractors and government agencies
Rank	Military rank	For individuals who have served in the armed forces. The rank shown is current at the time this list was created and is subject to change.
Rank	"n/a"	For civilians who have not served in the armed forces and therefore do not have military rank.
Class	Year/Letter	The year and order in which a class started. For example, 07A was the first of two classes to start in 2007.
Class	Roman Numeral	Four Aerospace Research Pilot School (ARPS) classes designated I, II, III, and IV, that prepared students for crewed spaceflight operations. These classes were dropped when the USAF lost its crewed spaceflight mission.
Class	MOL	Classes to train military astronauts of the Manned Orbital Laboratory (MOL) program. MOL was cancelled in 1969 before any of the astronauts went into space.
Class	AFIT	The USAF TPS selects up to eight students per year to attend the Air Force Institute of Technology (AFIT) at Wright-Patterson Air Force Base. These individuals attend 15 months of class work and thesis preparation prior to completing the USAF TPS curriculum.
Class	"n/a"	For faculty who taught at USAF TPS but were never students of the school.

=== Astronauts ===
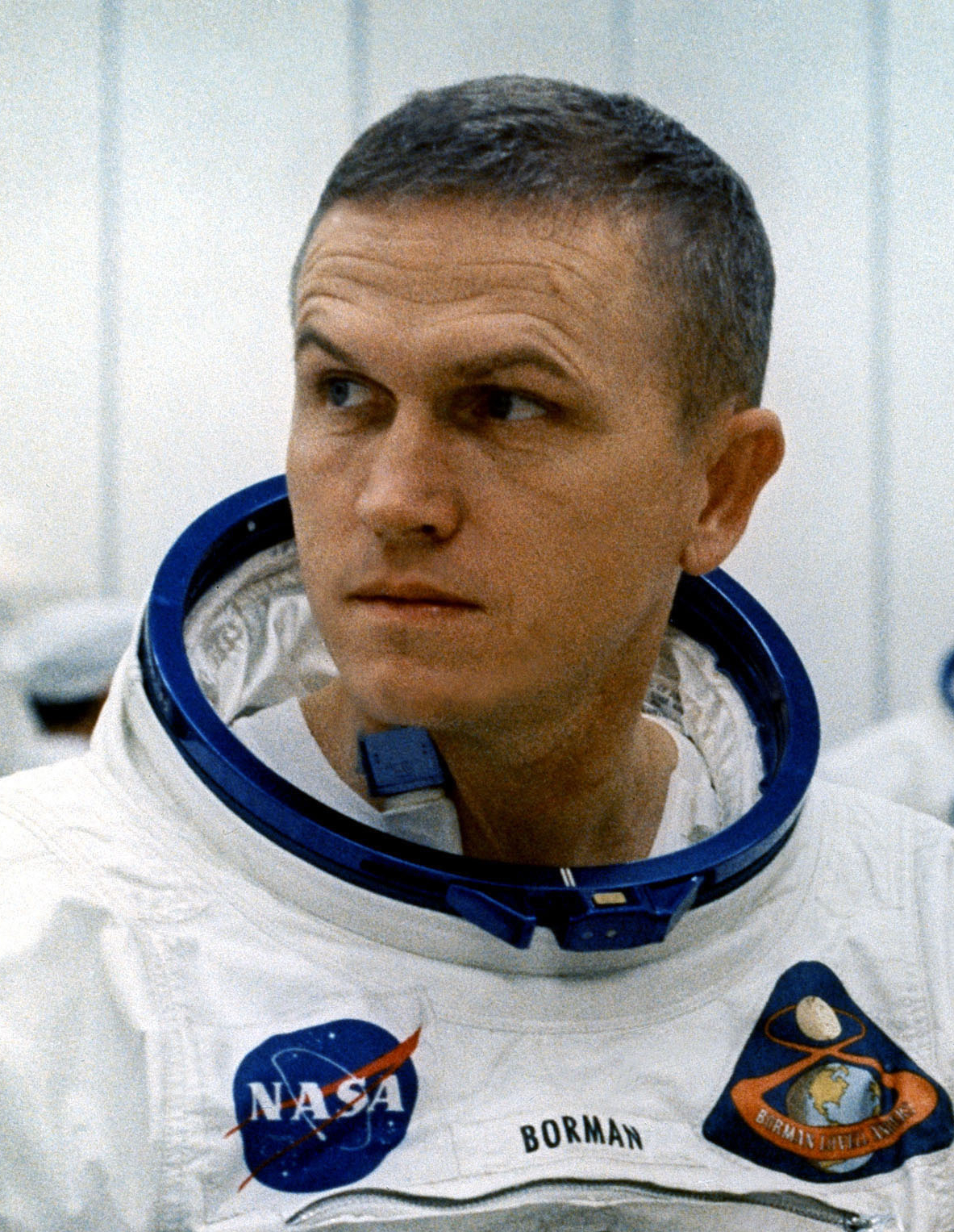
Col. Frank Borman, USAF, first lunar orbit as Apollo 8 commander

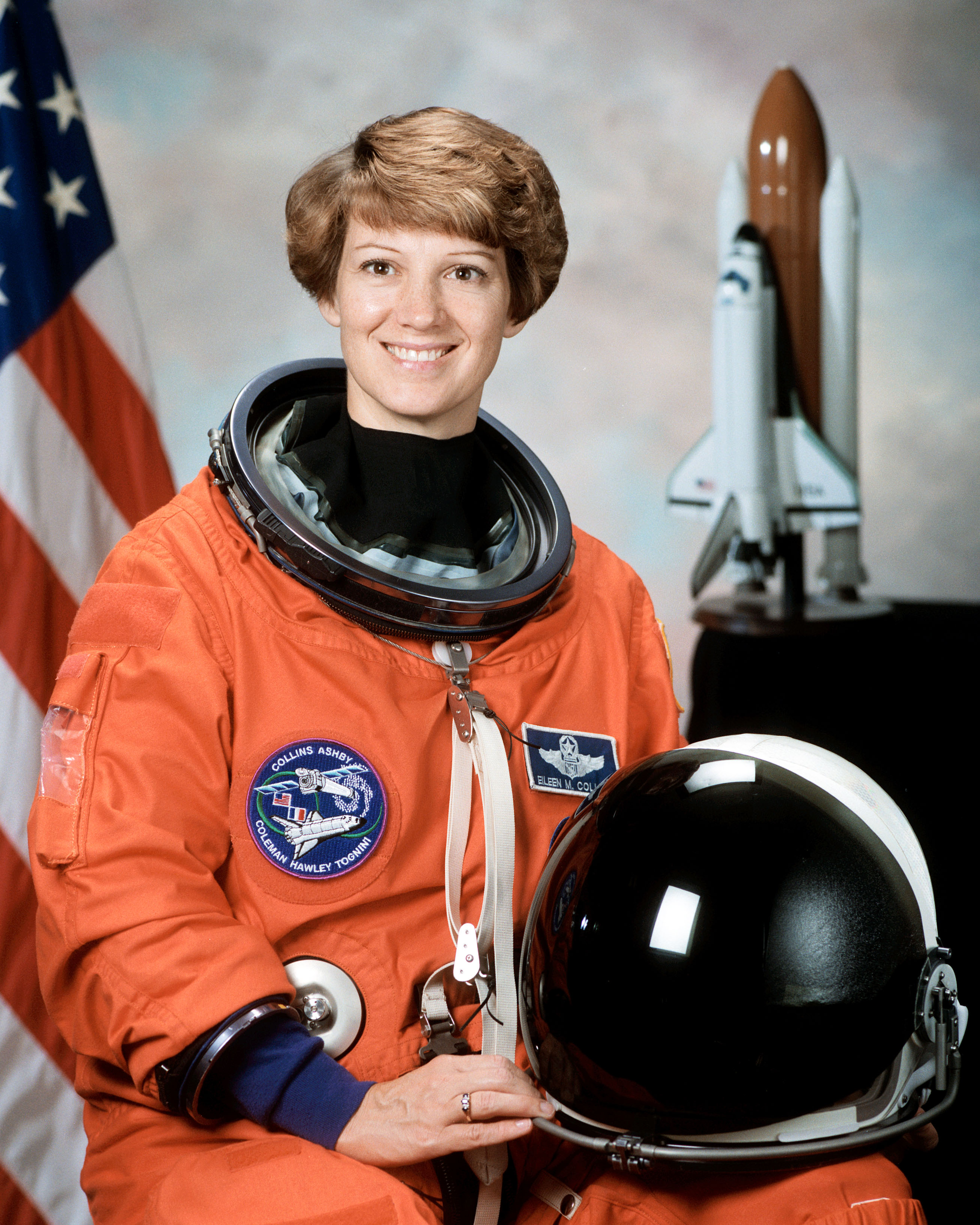
Col. Eileen Collins, USAF, first female shuttle pilot, first female shuttle commander

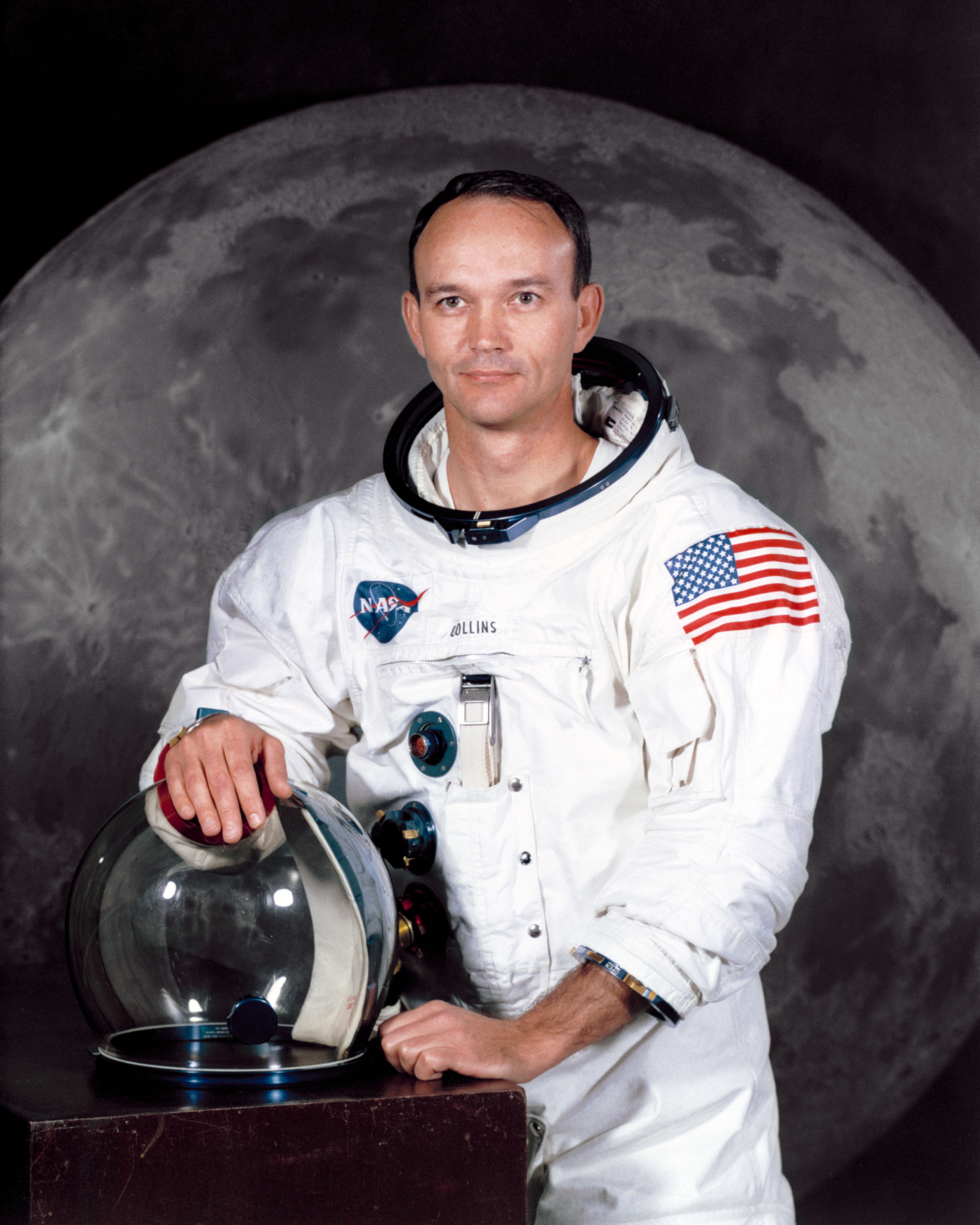
Maj. Gen. Michael Collins, USAF, Apollo 11 command module pilot

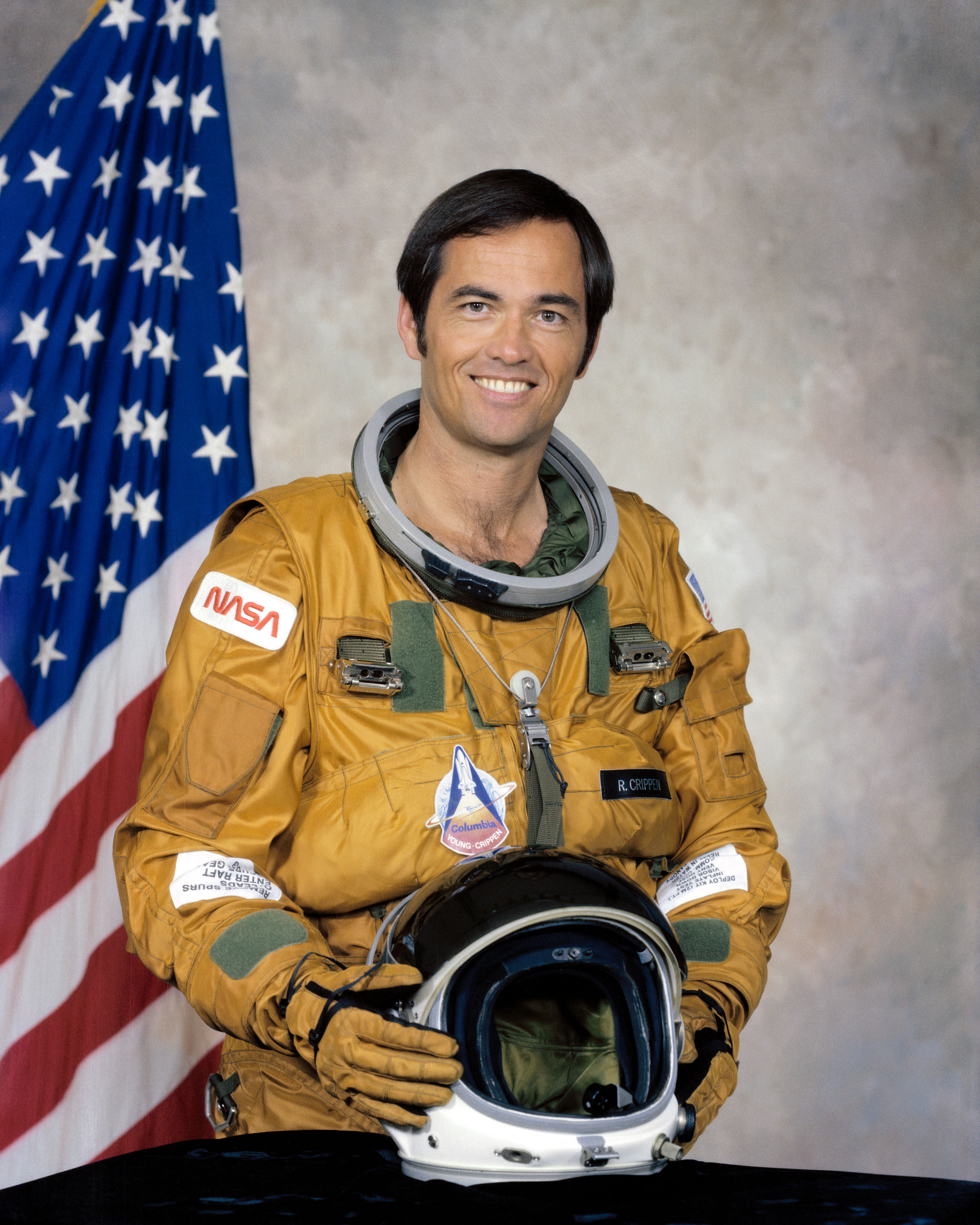
CAPT Robert Crippen, USN, STS-1 pilot, STS commander

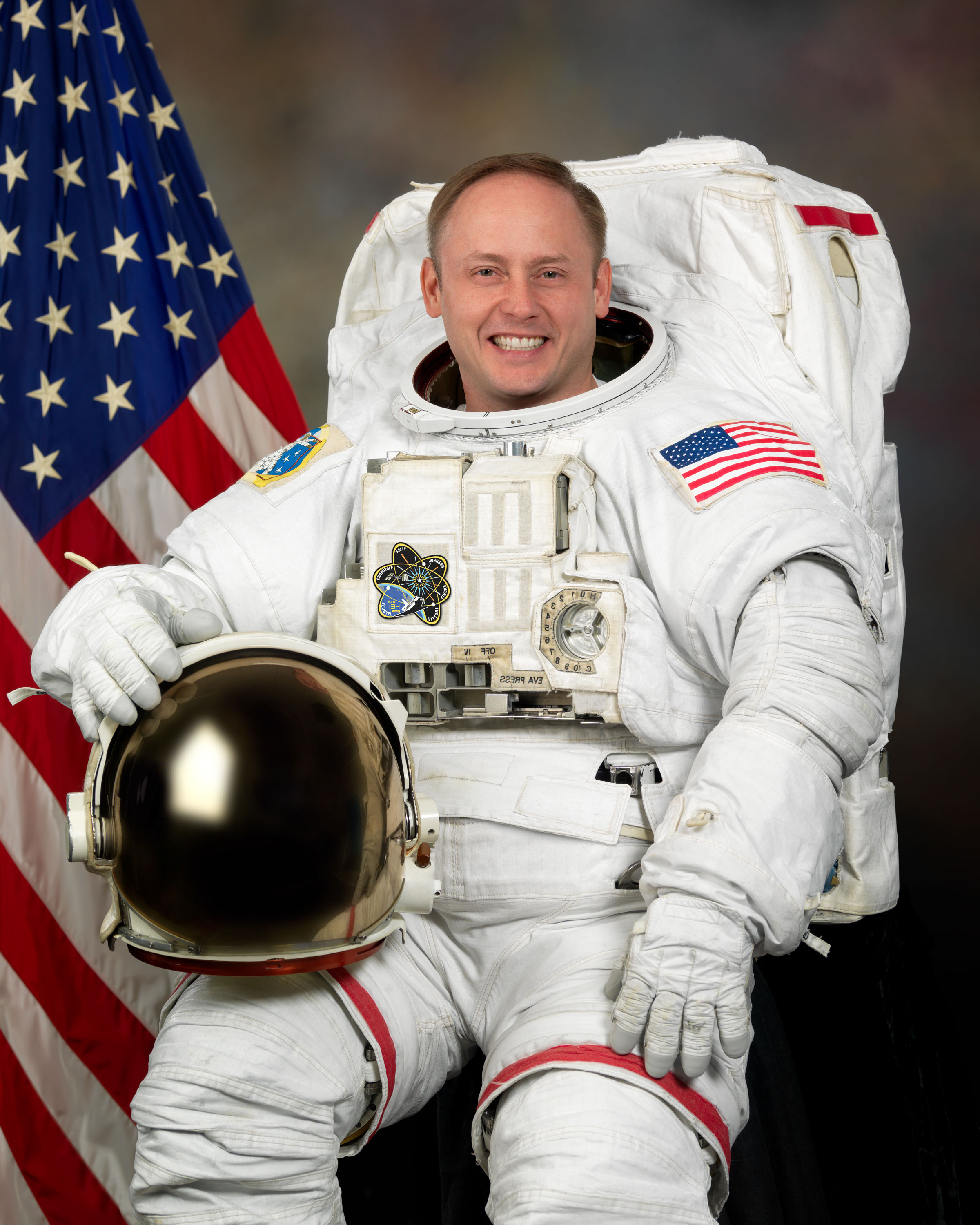
Col. E. Michael Fincke, ISS Commander, Boeing Starliner Pilot and former American with the most time in space

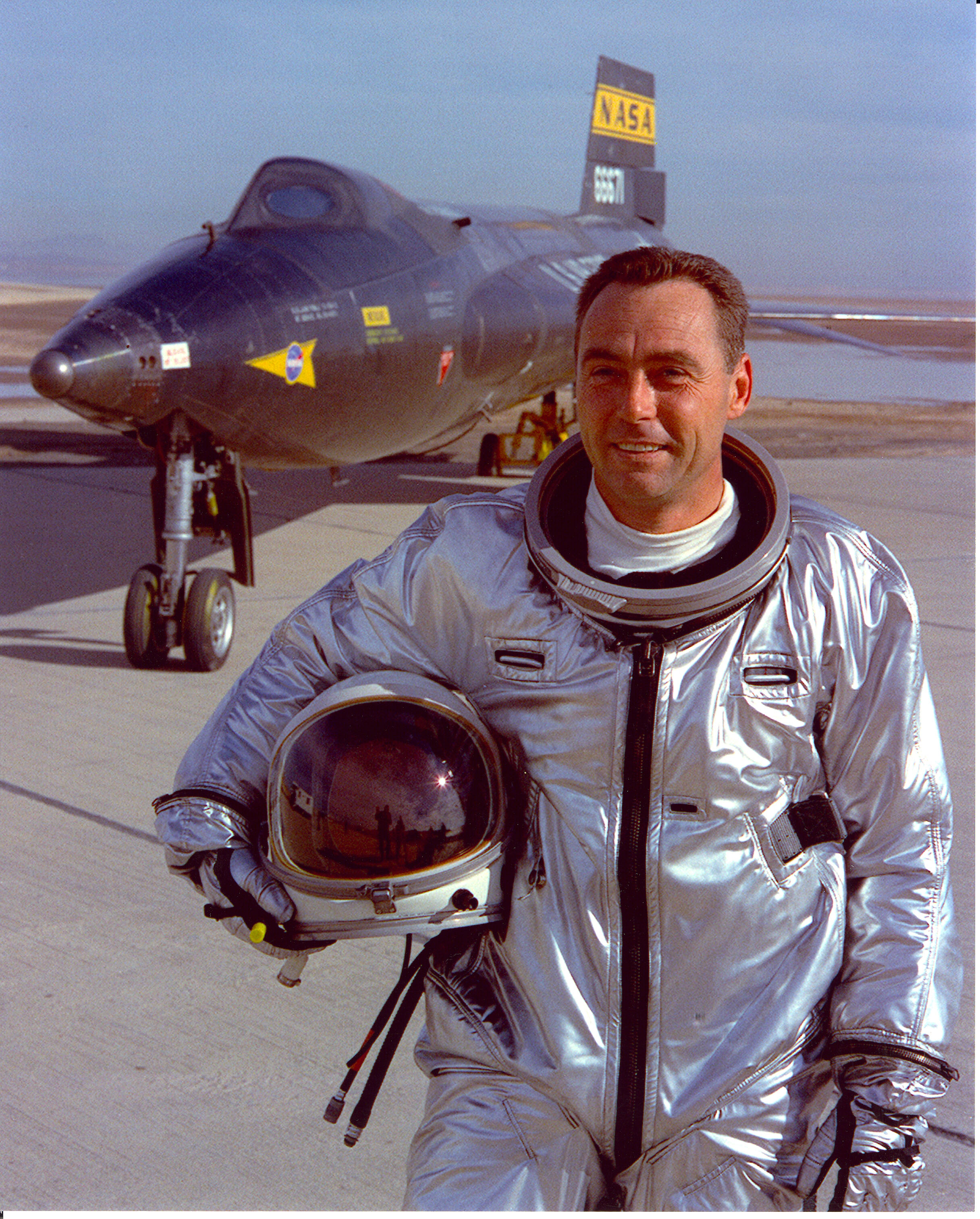
Maj. William "Pete" Knight by modified X-15A-2 after record-setting flight

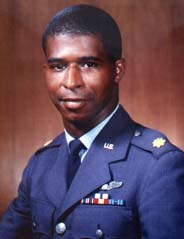
Maj. Robert Henry Lawrence Jr., USAF, first African-American astronaut

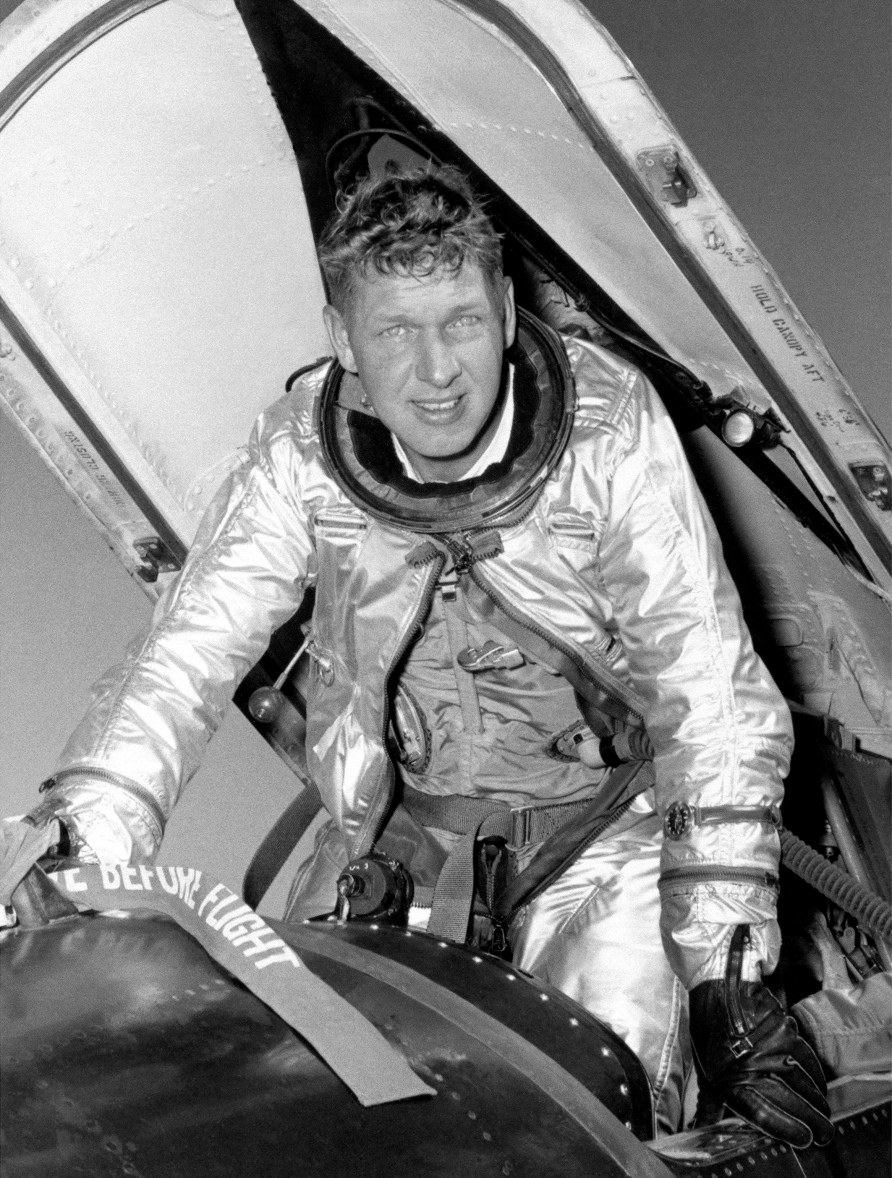
Maj. Gen. Robert Rushworth, USAF, X-15 test pilot

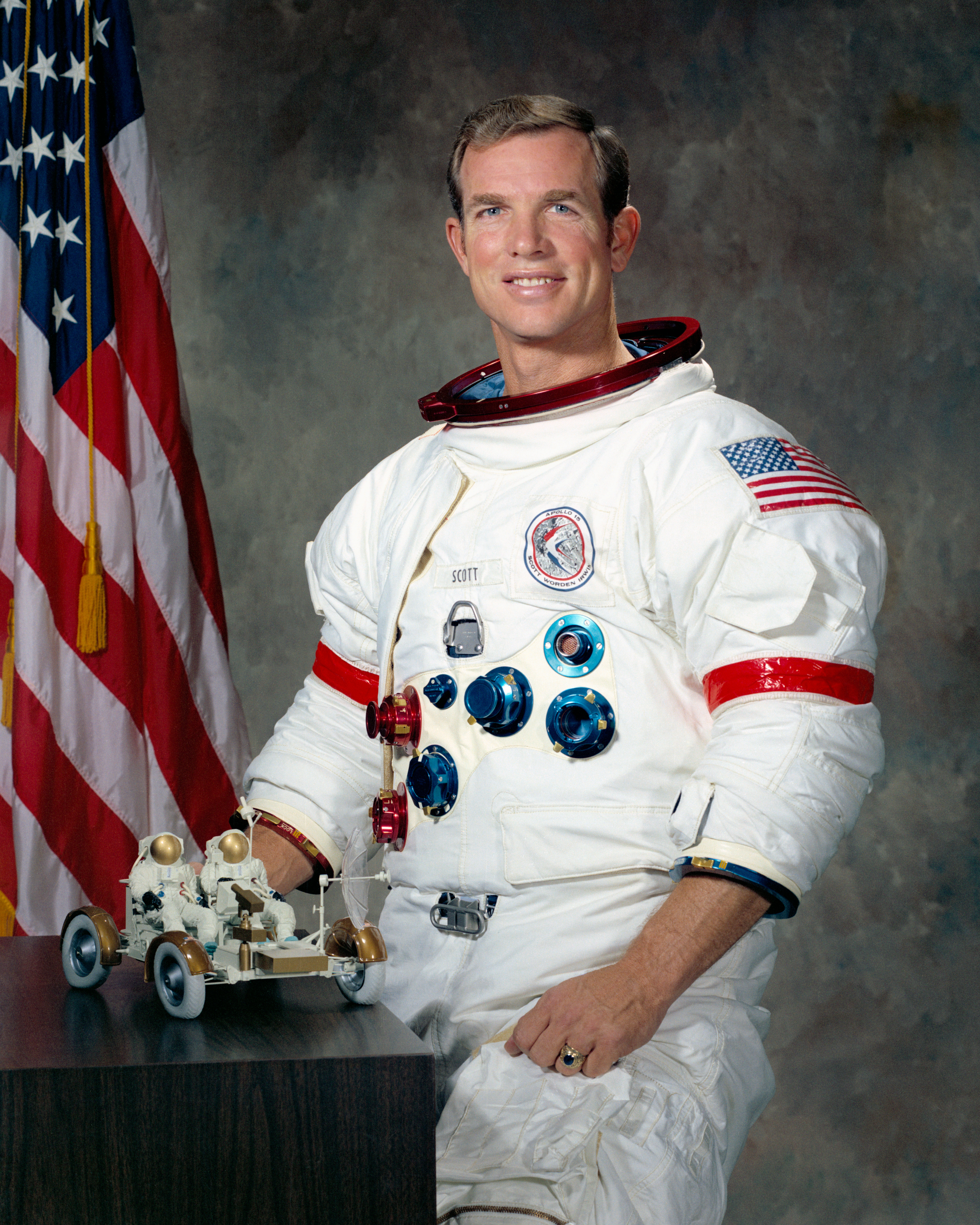
Col. David Scott, USAF, Apollo 15 commander, seventh man on the Moon

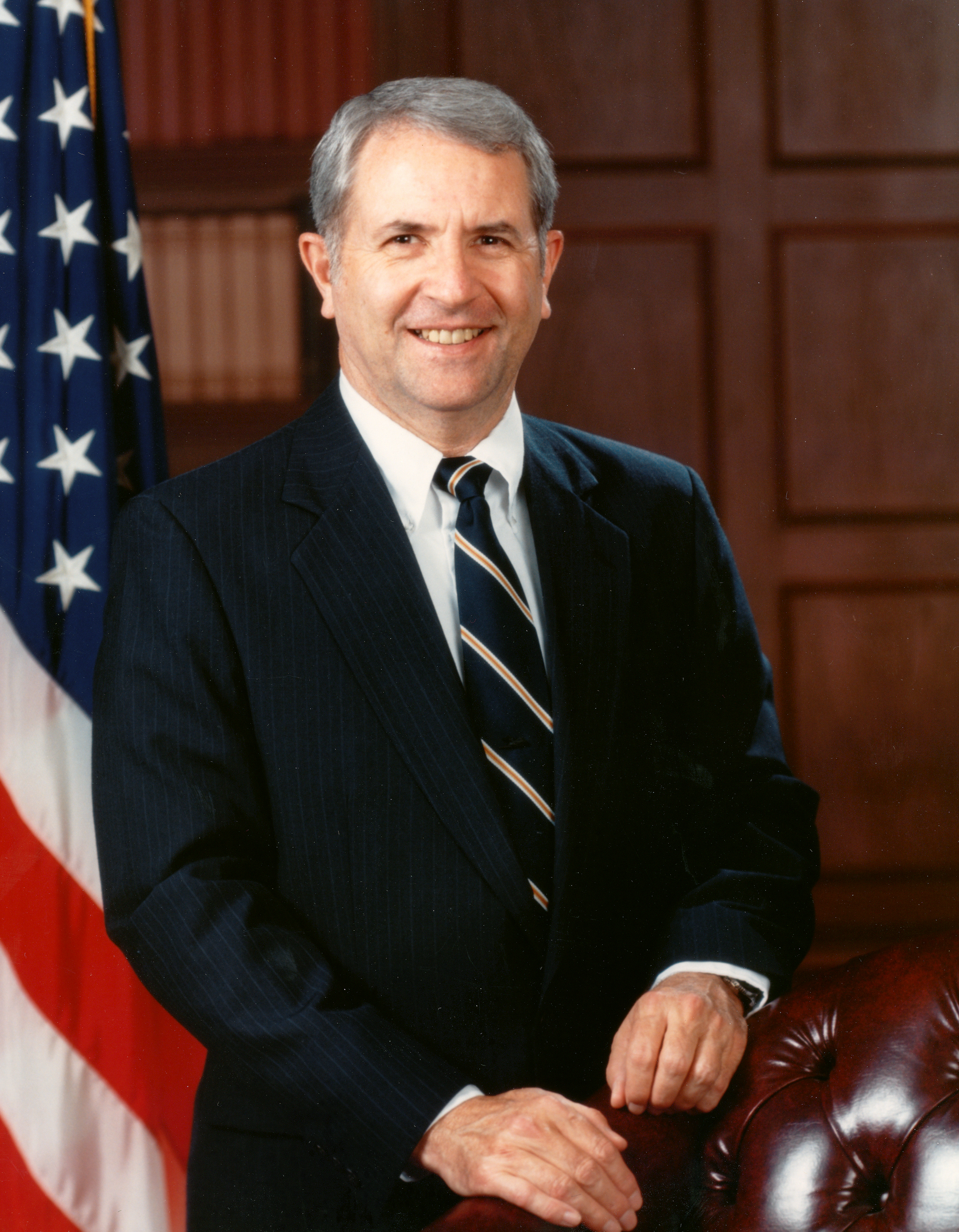
VADM. Richard H. Truly, USN, NASA administrator, STS commander and pilot

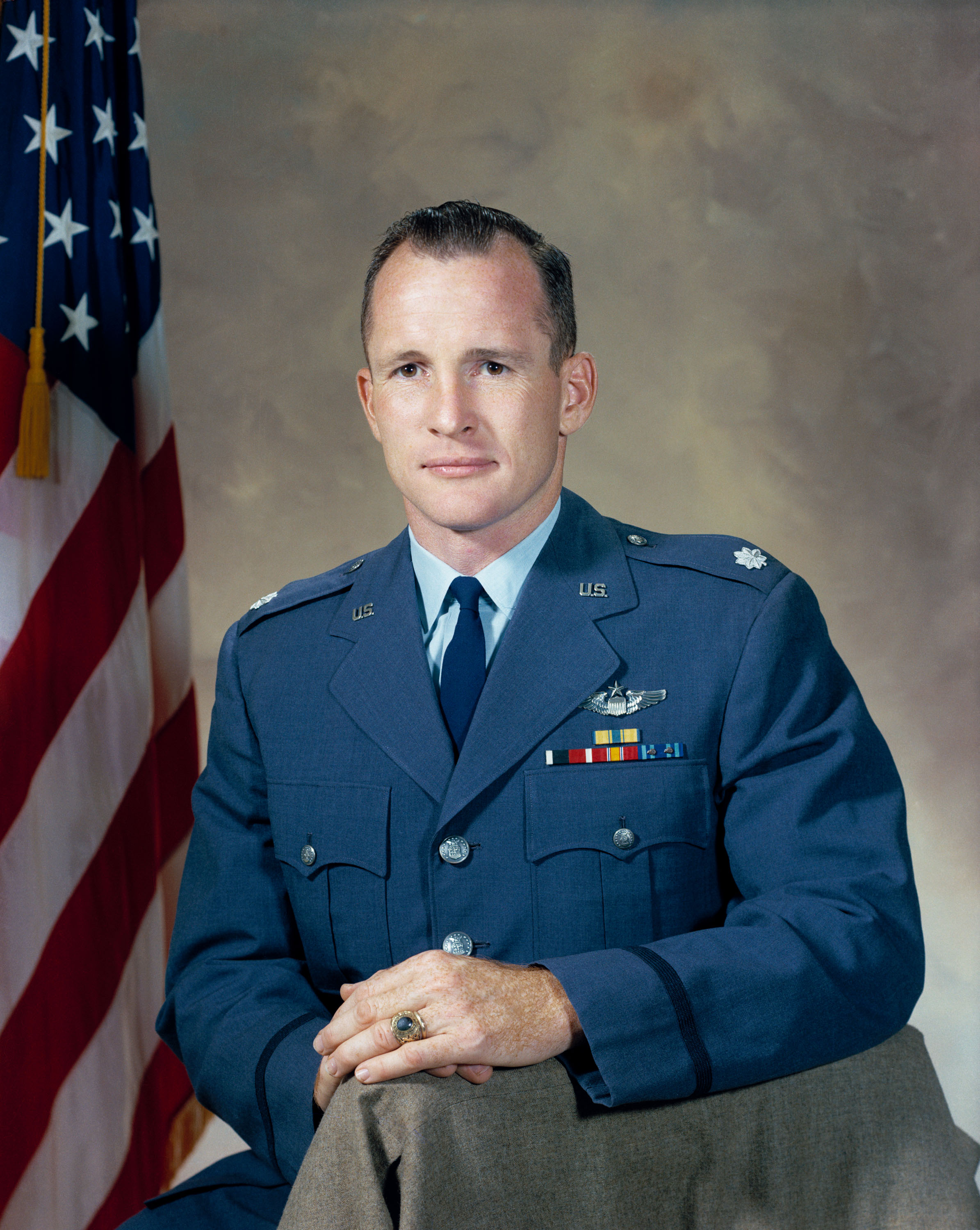
Lt. Col. Ed White, USAF, first U.S. spacewalk

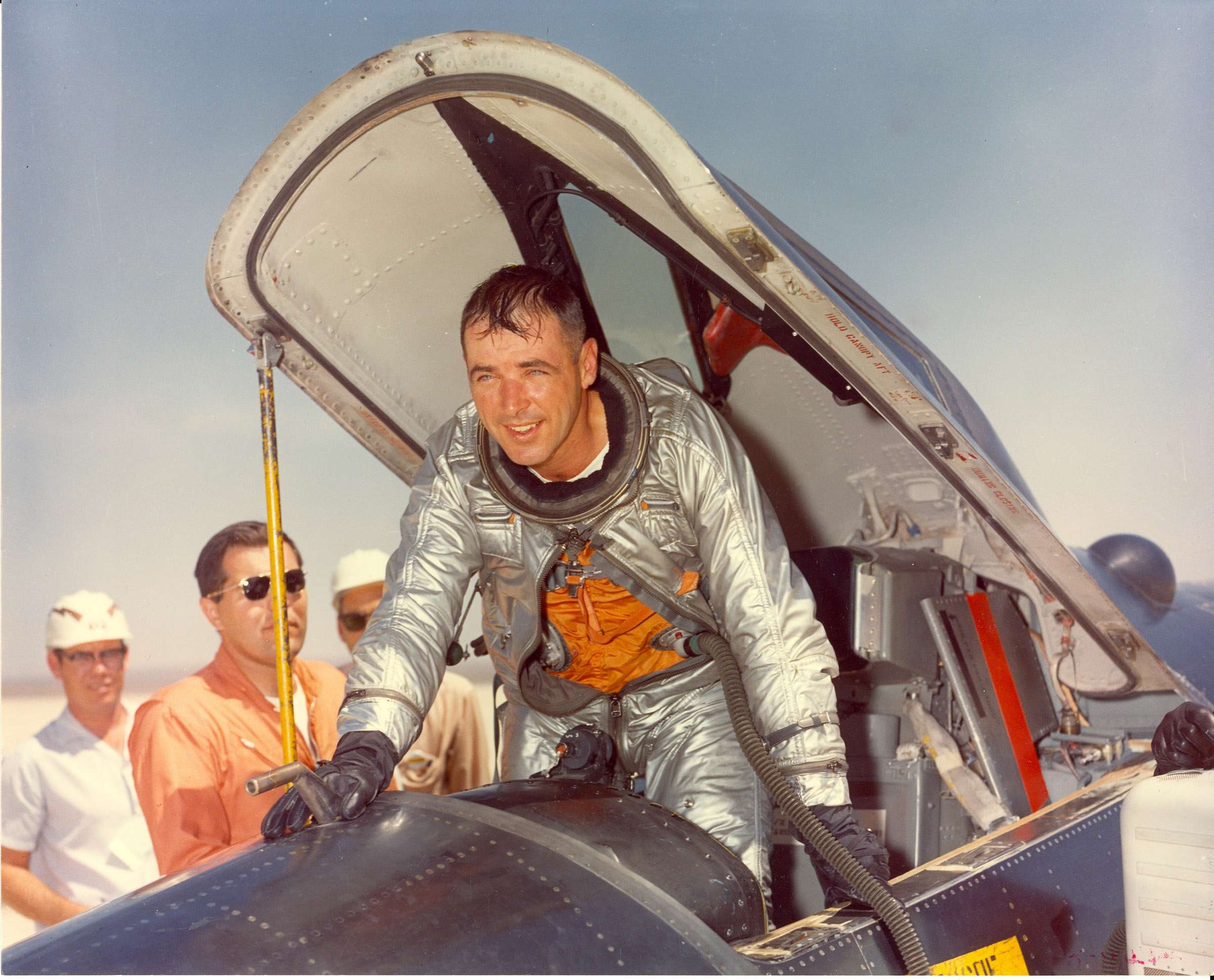
Maj. Gen. Bob White, USAF, first to exceed Mach 4, 5 and 6

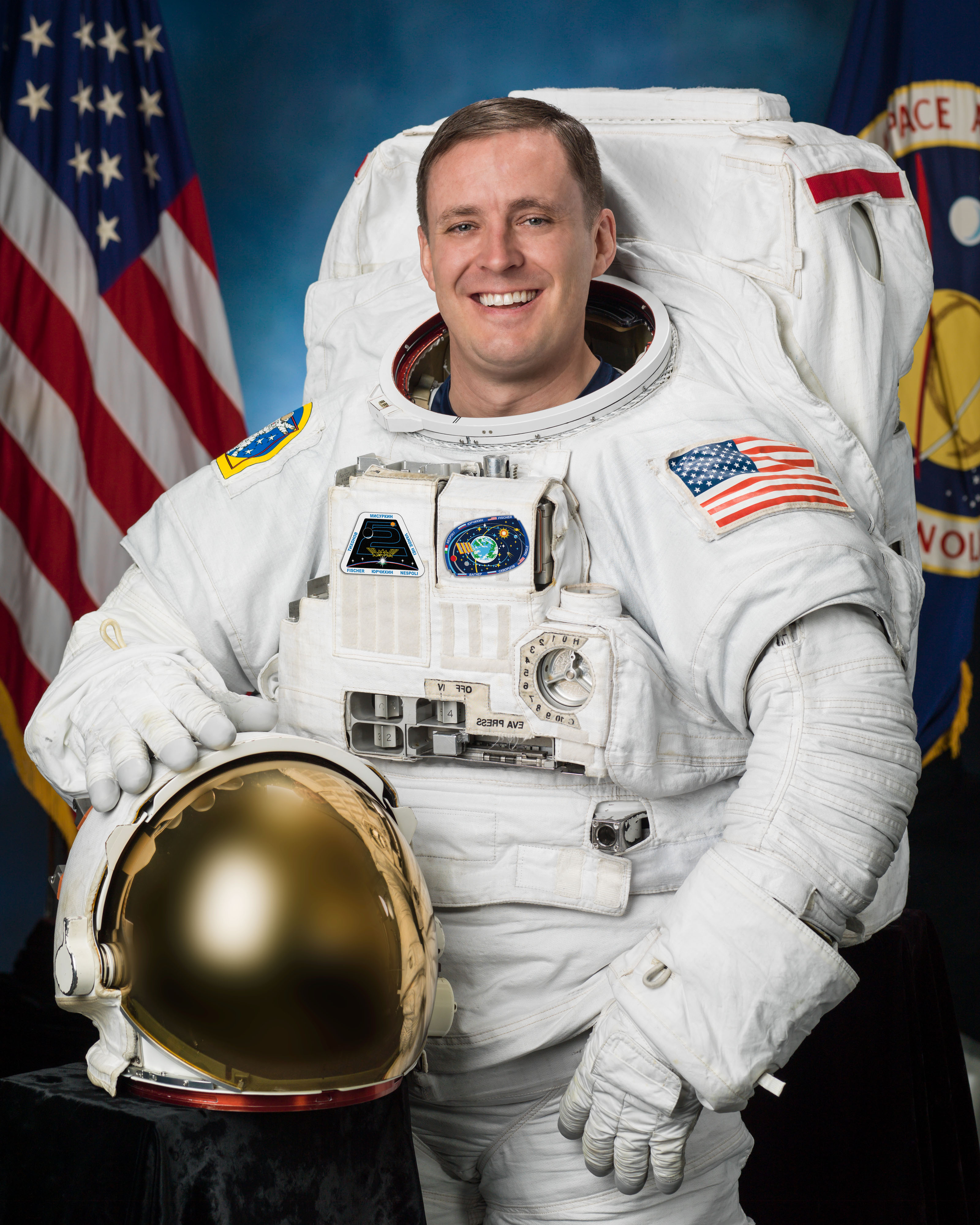
Col. Jack D. Fischer, USAF, flight engineer, Soyuz MS-04 (Expedition 51/52)

* Individual was killed in a work-related (aviation) accident.
* Individual was awarded the Liethen-Title Award.

Name	Service	Rank	Class	Notable events	Ref
Michael J. Adams*	USAF	Major	62C, IV, MOL	X-15 Flight 191, 1965 USAF MOL Group	
Thomas Akers	USAF	Colonel	82B	STS-41, STS-49, STS-61, STS-79	
Dominic A. Antonelli	USN	Commander	97B	STS-119, STS-132	
Lee Archambault	USAF	Colonel	94B	STS-117, STS-119	
Charles Bassett*	USAF	Captain	62A, III	1963 NASA Group 3	
Robert Behnken	USAF	Colonel	98B	STS-123, STS-130, SpX-DM2	
John E. Blaha	USAF	Colonel	71A	STS-29, STS-33, STS-43, STS-58, STS-79, Mir-22, STS-81	
Michael J. Bloomfield	USAF	Colonel	92A	STS-86, STS-97, STS-110	
Karol J. Bobko	USAF	Colonel	65B, MOL	STS-6, STS-51-D, STS-51-J	
Eric A. Boe	USAF	Colonel	97A	STS-126, STS-133	
Frank Borman	USAF	Colonel	60C, I	Gemini 7, Apollo 8	
Ken Bowersox	USN	Captain	85A	STS-50, STS-61, STS-73, STS-82, STS-113, Expedition 6, Soyuz TMA-1	
Roy D. Bridges Jr.	USAF	Major General	70B	STS-51-F	
Curtis Brown	USAF	Colonel	85B	STS-47, STS-66, STS-77, STS-85, STS-95, STS-103	
Duane G. Carey	USAF	Lt Colonel	92A	STS-109	
John Casper	USAF	Colonel	74A	STS-36, STS-54, STS-62, STS-77	
Kevin P. Chilton	USAF	General	84A	STS-49, STS-59, STS-76	
Eileen Collins	USAF	Colonel	89B	STS-63 (first female shuttle pilot), STS-84, STS-93 (first female shuttle commander), STS-114 (Return to Flight after Columbia Disaster)	
Michael Collins	USAFR	Major General	60C, III	Gemini 10, Apollo 11	
Gordon Cooper	USAF	Colonel	56D	Mercury 9, Gemini 5	
Richard O. Covey	USAF	Colonel	74B	STS-51-I, STS-26 (Return to Flight after Challenger Disaster), STS-38, STS-61	
Albert H. Crews	USAF	Colonel	60A, II, MOL	1962 Dyna-Soar Group, 1965 USAF MOL Group	
Robert Crippen	USN	Captain	65A, MOL	STS-1, STS-7, STS-41-C, STS-41-G	
Brian Duffy	USAF	Colonel	82B	STS-57, STS-72, STS-92	
Charles Duke	USAF	Brig. General	64C	Apollo 16	
James Dutton	USAF	Colonel	00A	STS-131	
Donn F. Eisele	USAF	Colonel	62A	Apollo 7	
Joe Engle	USAF	Colonel	61C, III	X-15 Flight 138, X-15 Flight 143, X-15 Flight 153, ALT, STS-2, STS-51-I	
Michael Fincke	USAF	Colonel	93B	Soyuz TMA-4 (Expedition 9), Soyuz TMA-13 (Expedition 18), STS-134, Boeing Starliner-1 (Expedition 72/73)	
John L. Finley	USN	Captain	64A, MOL	1965 USAF MOL Group	
Jack D. Fischer	USAF	Colonel	03B	Soyuz MS-04 (Expedition 51/52)	
Kevin A. Ford	USAF	Colonel	90A	STS-128, Soyuz TMA-06M (Expedition 33/34)	
Michael E. Fossum	USAF	Colonel	85A	STS-121, STS-124, Soyuz TMA-02M (Expedition 28/29)	
Theodore Freeman*	USAF	Captain	62A, IV	1963 NASA Group	
C. Gordon Fullerton	USAF	Colonel	64B, MOL	ALT, STS-3, STS-51-F	
Guy Gardner	USAF	Colonel	75A	STS-27, STS-35, TPS Commandant	
Edward Givens	USAF	Major	58B, III	1966 NASA Group	
Victor Glover	USN	Captain	06B	SpaceX Crew-1 (Expedition 64/65), Artemis II	
Ronald J. Grabe	USAF	Colonel	74A	STS-51-J, STS-30, STS-42, STS-57	
William G. Gregory	USAF	Lt Colonel	87A	STS-67	
Gus Grissom*	USAF	Lt Colonel	56D	Mercury-Redstone 4, Gemini 3, Apollo 1	
Sidney M. Gutierrez	USAF	Colonel	81A	STS-40, STS-59	
Chris Hadfield	RCAF	Colonel	88A	STS-74, STS-100, Soyuz TMA-07M (Expedition 34/35)	
Nick Hague	USAF	Colonel	03A	Soyuz MS-10, Soyuz MS-12 (Expedition 59/60, SpaceX Crew-9 (Expedition 71/72)	
Fred Haise	USMC	n/a	64A	Apollo 13, ALT	
James D. Halsell	USAF	Colonel	86A	STS-65, STS-74, STS-83, STS-94, STS-101	
Henry Hartsfield	USAF	Colonel	64C, MOL	STS-4, STS-41-D, STS-61-A	
Susan J. Helms	USAF	Lt General	88A	STS-54, STS-64, STS-78, STS-101, Expedition 2 (STS-102 / STS-105)	
Terence T. Henricks	USAF	Colonel	83A	STS-44, STS-55, STS-70, STS-78	
Robert T. Hines	USAF	Lt Colonel	07B	SpaceX Crew-4 (Expedition 67/68)	
Michael S. Hopkins	USAF	Colonel	96B	Soyuz TMA-10M (Expedition 37/38), SpaceX Crew-1 (Expedition 64/65)	
Scott J. Horowitz	USAF	Colonel	90A	STS-75, STS-82, STS-101, STS-105	
Richard D. Husband*	USAF	Colonel	88A	STS-96, STS-107 Columbia loss	
James Irwin	USAF	Colonel	60C, IV	Apollo 15	
Gregory C. Johnson	USNR	Captain	84A	STS-125	
Gregory H. Johnson	USAF	Colonel	94A	STS-123 STS-134	
James M. Kelly	USAF	Colonel	93B	STS-102, STS-114	
Pete Knight	USAF	Colonel	58C, 63A	X-15 Flight 190, California State Senator	
Joshua Kutryk	RCAF	Lt Colonel	11B	SpaceX Crew-13 (Expedition 75/76)	
Robert Lawrence*	USAF	Major	66B, MOL	First African-American astronaut, 1967 USAF MOL Group	
Richard E. Lawyer	USAF	Colonel	63A, MOL	1965 USAF MOL Group	
Steven W. Lindsey	USAF	Colonel	89A, AFIT	STS-87, STS-95, STS-104, STS-121 STS-133	
Paul Lockhart	USAF	Colonel	91A	STS-111, STS-113	
Christopher Loria	USMC	Colonel	93A	1996 NASA Group	
Lachlan Macleay	USAF	Colonel	60A, IV, MOL	1965 USAF MOL Group	
Ken Mattingly	USN	Rear Admiral	65B	Apollo 16, STS-4, STS-51-C	
Jon McBride	USN	Captain	75A	STS-41-G	
James McDivitt	USAF	Brig. General	59C, I	Gemini 4, Apollo 9	
Donald R. McMonagle	USAF	Colonel	81A	STS-39, STS-54, STS-66	
Carl J. Meade	USAF	Colonel	80B	STS-38, STS-50, STS-64	
Pamela Melroy	USAF	Colonel	91B	STS-92, STS-112, STS-120	
Edgar Mitchell	USN	Captain	65B	Apollo 14	
Richard Mullane	USAF	Colonel	75B	STS-41-D, STS-27, STS-36	
Steven R. Nagel	USAF	Colonel	75A	STS-51-G, STS-61-A, STS-37, STS-55	
Francis G. Neubeck	USAF	Colonel	60C, III, MOL	1965 USAF MOL Group	
Ellison Onizuka*	USAF	Colonel	74B	STS-51-C, STS-51-L Challenger loss	
Robert F. Overmyer	USMC	Colonel	65C, MOL	STS-5, STS-51-B	
Donald H. Peterson	USAF	Colonel	66B, MOL	STS-6	
Mark L. Polansky	USAF	Captain	86B	STS-98, STS-116, STS-127	
Charles J. Precourt	USAF	Colonel	85A	STS-55, STS-71, STS-84, STS-91	
Russell L. Rogers*	USAF	Lt Colonel	58C	1960 Dyna-Soar Group	
Stuart Roosa	USAF	Colonel	64C	Apollo 14	
Jerry L. Ross	USAF	Colonel	75B	STS-61-B, STS-27, STS-37, STS-55, STS-74, STS-88, STS-110	
Robert A. Rushworth	USAF	Major General	56C	X-15 Flight 87	
Dick Scobee*	USAF	Lt Colonel	71B	STS-41-C, STS-51-L Challenger loss	
David Scott	USAF	Colonel	62C, IV	Gemini 8, Apollo 9, Apollo 15	
Brewster H. Shaw	USAF	Colonel	75B	STS-9, STS-61-B, STS-28	
Loren Shriver	USAF	Colonel	75A	STS-51-C, STS-31, STS-46	
Deke Slayton	USAF	Major	55C	1st Chief of the Astronaut Office, Apollo–Soyuz Test Project	
Thomas P. Stafford	USAF	Lt General	58C	Gemini 6A, Gemini 9A, Apollo 10, ASTP	
Frederick W. Sturckow	USMC	Colonel	92A	STS-88, STS-105, STS-117, STS-128, VP-03, Unity 21, Unity 25, Galactic 02, Galactic 04, Galactic 06	
James M. Taylor*	USAF	Lt Colonel	63A, MOL	1965 USAF MOL Group	
Richard H. Truly	USN	Vice Admiral	64A, MOL	ALT, STS-2, STS-8, 8th Administrator of NASA	
Terry W. Virts	USAF	Colonel	98B	STS-130, Soyuz TMA-15M (Expedition 42/43)	
Rex J. Walheim	USAF	Colonel	92A	STS-110, STS-122, STS-135	
David M. Walker	USN	Captain	71A	STS-51-A, STS-30, STS-53, STS-69	
Carl E. Walz	USAF	Colonel	83A	STS-51, STS-65, STS-79, STS-108, Expedition 4, STS-111	
Ed White*	USAF	Lt Colonel	59C	Gemini 4, Apollo 1	
Robert M. White	USAF	Major General	54C	X-15 Flight 62	
James W. Wood	USAF	Colonel	56D	1960 Dyna-Soar Group 1	
Alfred Worden	USAF	Colonel	64C	Apollo 15	
George D. Zamka	USMC	Colonel	94A	STS-120, STS-130	

=== Flight test ===
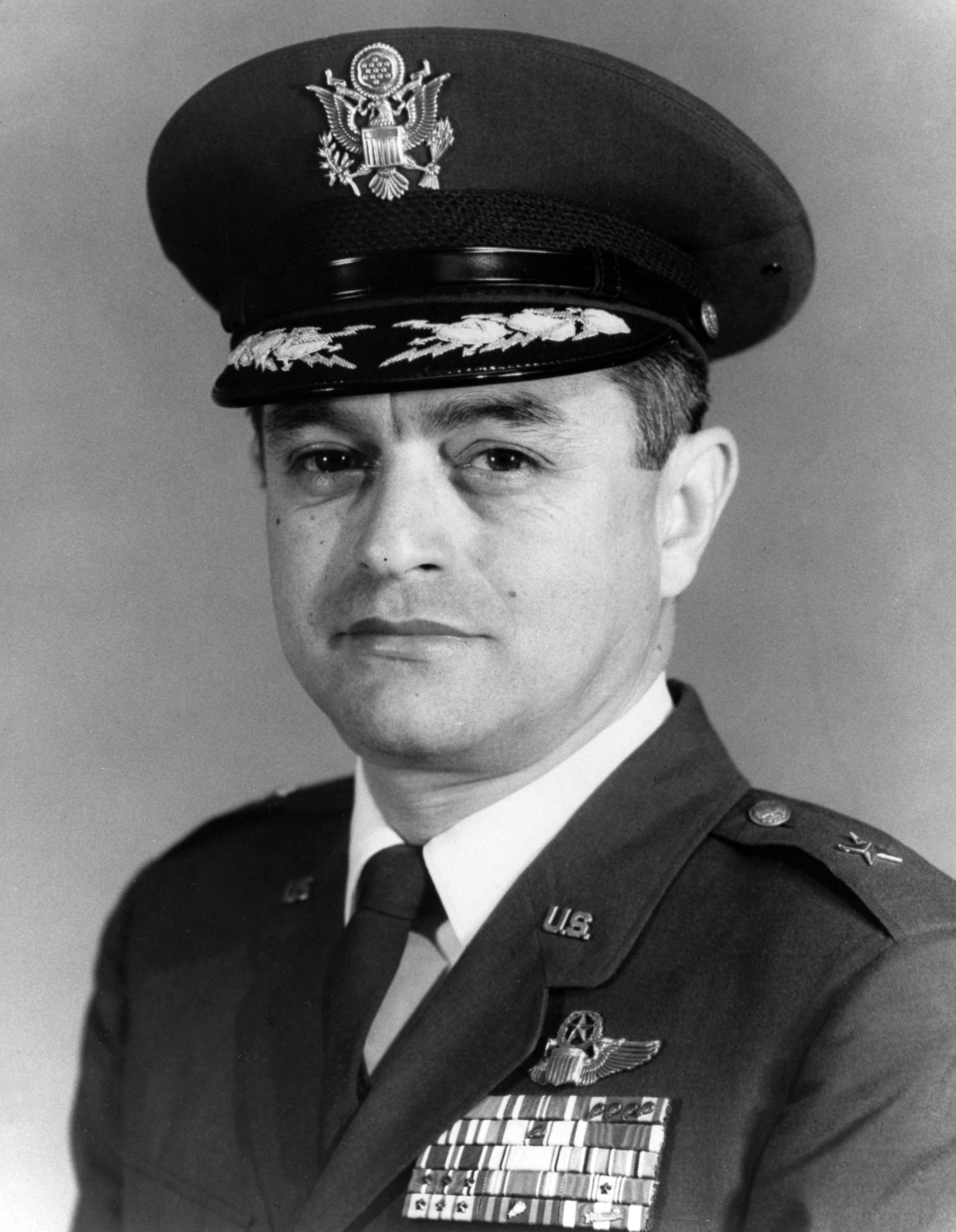
Brig. Gen. Robert Cardenas, USAF, YB-49 chief USAF test pilot

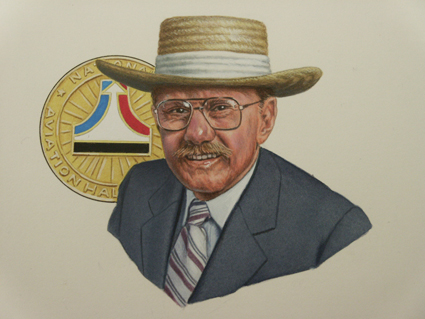
Lt. Bob Hoover, USAF, test and demonstration pilot

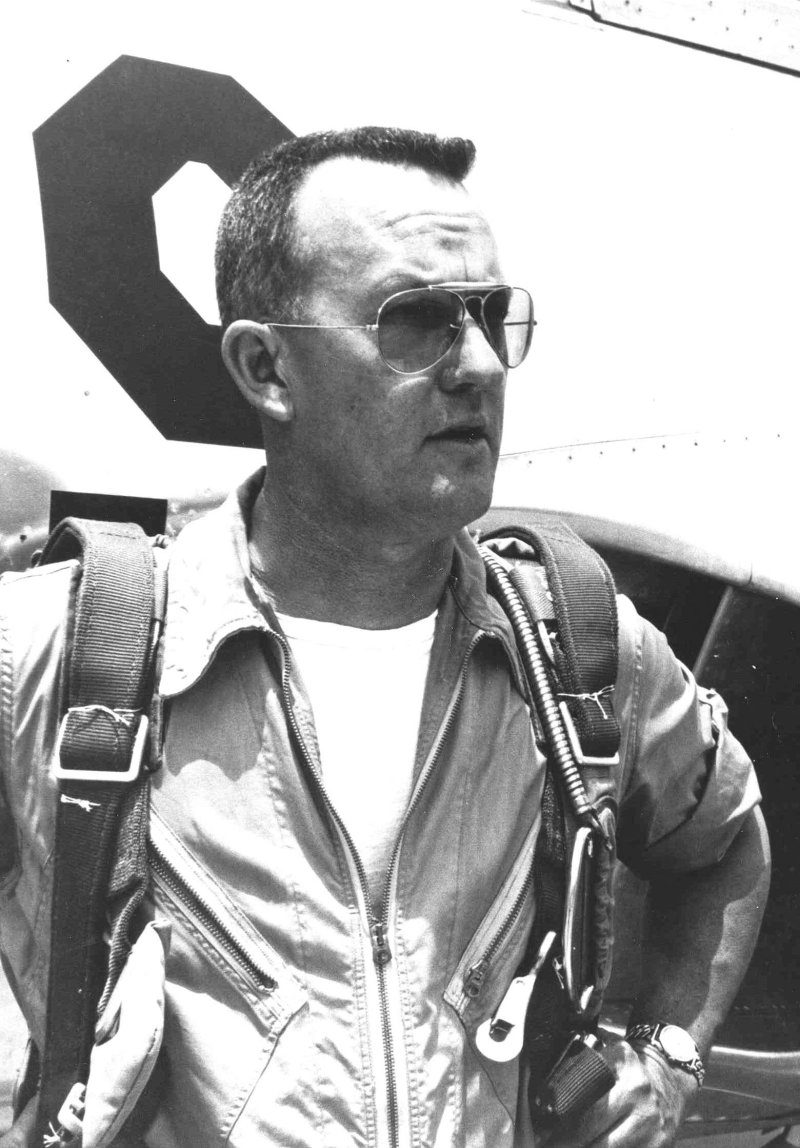
Tony LeVier, Lockheed, chief test pilot

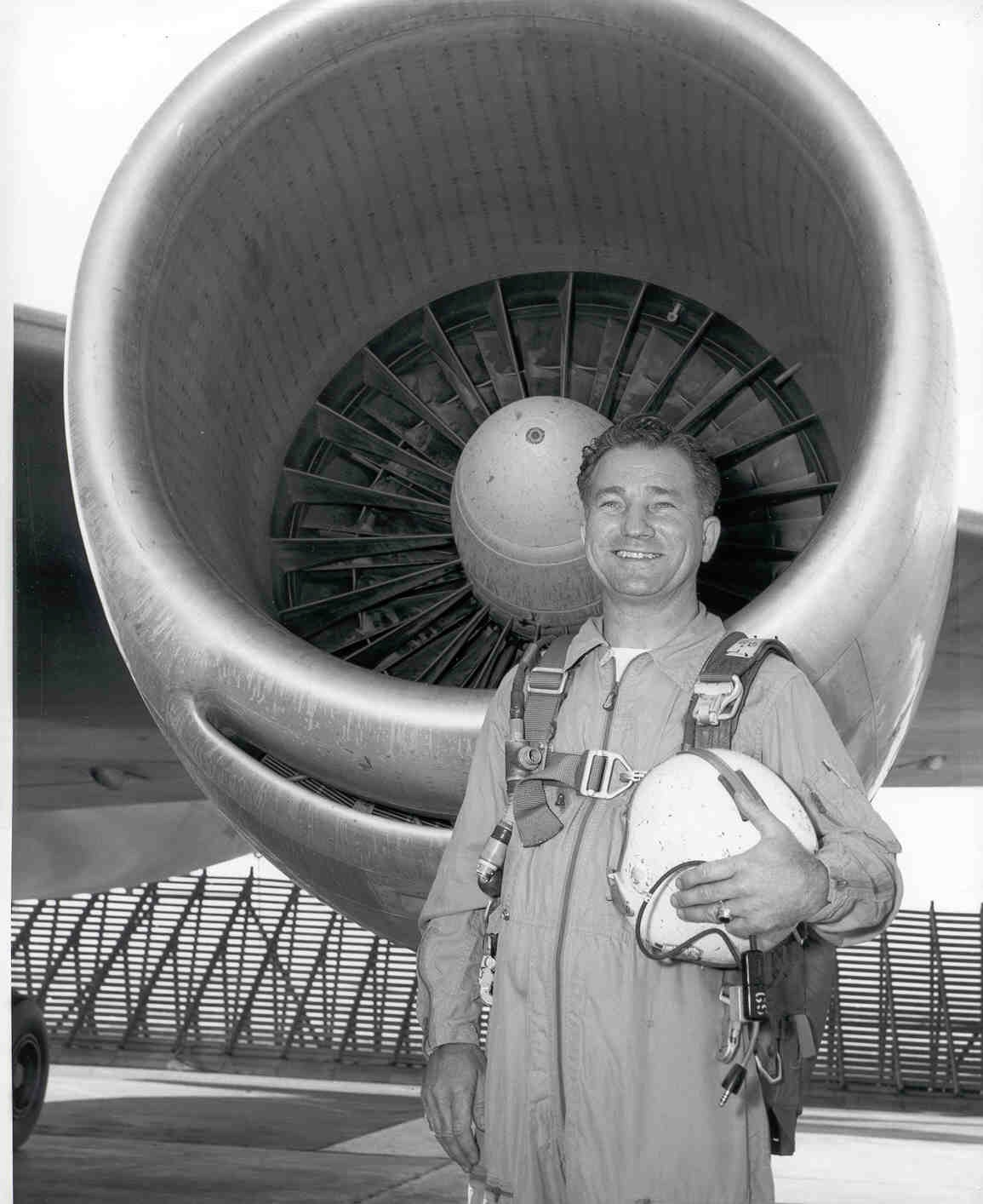
Joseph John "Tym" Tymczyszyn, Test Pilot of America's first commercial jet aircraft

* Individual was killed in a work-related (aviation) accident.

Name	Service	Rank	Class	Notable events	Ref
Milburn G. Apt*	USAF	Captain	54B	First to exceed Mach 3. Speed record of Mach 3.2 in X-2	
Fred J. Ascani	USAF	Major General	46B	Father of Systems Engineering at Wright Field. F-86 speed record	
Richard Bong*	USAF	Major	45	United States' highest-scoring air ace. Medal of Honor recipient	
James "JB" Brown	USAF	Major	86A	F-22 Raptor lead test pilot and F-117 Nighthawk chief test pilot	
Robert Cardenas	USAF	Brig. General	46J	B-29 commander on mission to break sound barrier. Chief USAF test pilot for YB-49 flying wing	
Ken Chilstrom	USAF	Colonel	45	Tested over twenty German and Japanese aircraft during World War II. First military pilot to fly XP-86. First jet air race. First transport of air mail by jet	
Glen Edwards*	USAF	Captain	45	Namesake of Edwards Air Force Base	
Frank K. Everest	USAF	Brig. General	46D	Speed record of Mach 2.9 in the X-2. Subject and co-author of The Fastest Man Alive	
Fitzhugh L. Fulton	USAF	Brig. General	52B	Altitude record of 85,360 ft (26.02 km) in the B-58. XB-70, YF-12, 747 Space Shuttle Carrier Aircraft testing	
Darryl Greenamyer	Lockheed	n/a	63A	Piston engine speed record of 776 km/h (482 mph) in an F8F-2. Low altitude speed record of 1,590 km/h (990 mph) in an F-104	
Bob Hoover	USAF	Lieutenant	46C	Flew chase during the Mach one flight. Named "the greatest stick-and-rudder man who ever lived" by Jimmy Doolittle. Noted air show pilot in Shrike Commander and P-51	
Dick Johnson	USAF	Major	46C	1948 world speed record in the F‑86. First flights of the YF‑102, YF‑106, and F‑111	
Kelly Latimer	USAF	Lt Colonel	96B	First female test pilot for NASA's DFRC flying on the SOFIA project. Test pilot on White Knight Two and Cosmic Girl	
Tony LeVier	Lockheed	n/a	45	Lockheed chief test pilot. P-38, P-80, XF-90, XF-104, U-2 testing	
Frank E. Liethen	USAF	Major	61C	United States Air Force Thunderbirds	
Donald L. Mallick	USNR	LCDR	64A	LLRV, XB-70, and YF-12 testing	
Arthur W. Murray	USAF	Major	45G	X-1A, X-1B, X-4, X-5 testing	
Art Nalls	USMC	Lt Colonel	85A	Harrier testing; owner and air show pilot of privately owned Harrier	
Wilbert Pearson	USAF	Major General	82A	First pilot to shoot down a satellite from an aircraft; commander of Air Force Flight Test Center	
Bruce Peterson	NASA	n/a	63A	M2-F1, M2-F2, HL-10 lifting body flights	
Steve Pisanos	USAF	Colonel	45D	F-80 Shooting Star, F-102 Delta Dagger, F-4E testing	
Jack Ridley*	USAF	Colonel	46A	Project engineer for the team that broke the sound barrier	
Lou Schalk	USAF	Captain	54A	First flight of the A-12; flight test of A-12, YF-12 and SR-71 Blackbird; Chief test pilot of Lockheed Skunk Works	
Robert L. Stephens	USAF	Colonel	49D	Speed and altitude records testing the YF-12 and SR-71	
Robert E. Thacker	USAF	Colonel	46	P-80 Shooting Star, P-82 distance/speed record, Lockheed solar-powered aircraft	
David Tittle	USAF	Major	55D	Ryan XV-5 Vertifan	
Guy M. Townsend	USAF	Brig. General	46F	Co-pilot on the first flight of the B-52 Stratofortress. First military pilot to fly the B-47 Stratojet, B-50 Superfortress, B-52 Stratofortress, and the prototype of the KC-135 Stratotanker	
Joseph John "Tym" Tymczyszyn	FAA	n/a	49C	Test Pilot on America's First Commercial Jet Aircraft, the Boeing 707	
Chuck Yeager	USAF	Brig. General	46C	Fighter ace; first to travel faster than sound during level flight; first to reach Mach 2.5; Commandant of Aerospace Research Pilot School	

=== Military commanders ===
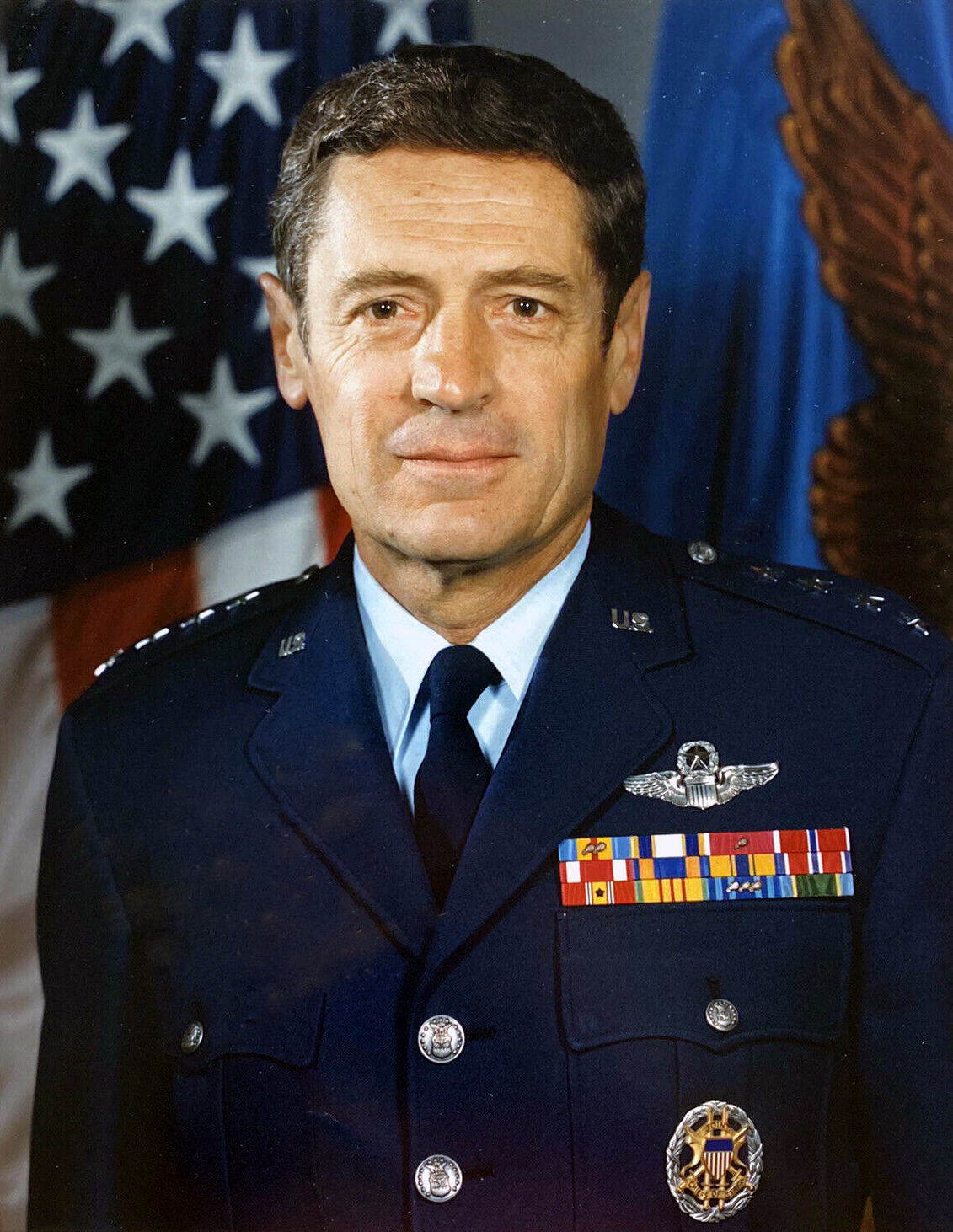
Gen. Robert T. Herres, USAF, Vice Chairman of the Joint Chiefs of Staff

Name	Service	Rank	Class	Notable events	Ref
James A. Abrahamson	USAF	Lt General	66B, MOL	Strategic Defense Initiative director	
David W. Allvin	USAF	General	93B	USAF Chief of Staff	
Spence M. Armstrong	USAF	Lt General	64C	Vice commander Air Force Systems Command, senior advisor to the NASA administrator	
William J. Campbell	USAF	Lt General	62C, IV	Vice commander Strategic Air Command, TPS Commandant	
Eugene P. Deatrick	USAF	Colonel	51A, 53C	TPS Commandant. Rescue of Navy Lt. Dieter Dengler	
Gabby Gabreski	USAF	Colonel	45G	Top American fighter ace in Europe during World War II	
Robert T. Herres	USAF	General	66B, MOL	Vice Chairman of the Joint Chiefs of Staff	
Donald J. Kutyna	USAF	General	65C	North American Aerospace Defense Command	
John M. Loh	USAF	General	67B	Chief of Staff of the United States Air Force	
Ronald W. Yates	USAF	General	66B	Air Force Materiel Command	

=== Authors ===
Col. Donald S. Lopez Sr., USAF, aviation author, WW II Ace

Name	Service	Rank	Class	Notable events	Ref
William Bridgeman	USN		53A	Man in Space Soonest, Author of The Lonely Sky	
Donald S. Lopez	USAF	Colonel	47F	Author of two aviation books. Smithsonian National Air and Space Museum deputy director	
George J. Marrett	USAF	Captain	64A	Author of five aviation books, three on flight testing including Contrails Over the Mojave, one on combat in Vietnam and one on a test pilot building a church.	
Robert "Bob" Rahn			44/45	Author of Tempting Fate	
