= Donald Lopez =

Donald Lopez may refer to:

- Donald S. Lopez Sr. (1923–2008), American Air Force fighter and test pilot
- Donald S. Lopez Jr. (born 1952), American scholar of Buddhism
