= Robert Cardenas =

United States Air Force general (1920–2022)

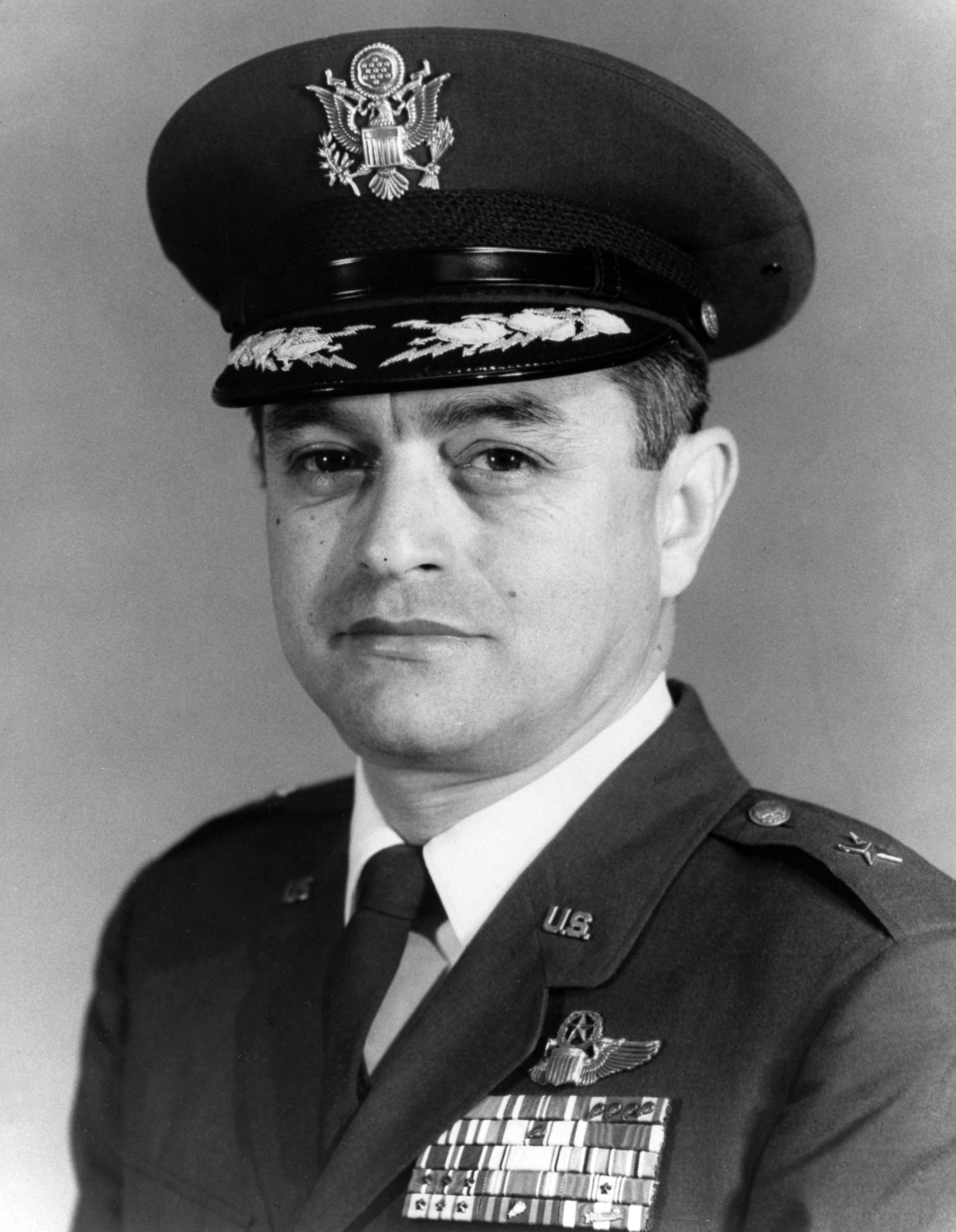
- Cardenas in the late 1960s
- Born: Robert Leon Cardenas; March 10, 1920; Mérida, Yucatán, Mexico
- Died: March 10, 2022 (aged 102); San Diego, California, U.S.
- Military career
- Allegiance: United States of America
- Branch: United States Air Force
- Service years: 1943–1947 (Army Air Forces); 1947–1973 (Air Force)
- Rank: Brigadier general
- Nickname: Bob
- Commands: Vice commander, Sixteenth Air Force, 1969; USAF Special Operations Force, 1968; 835th Air Division, 1966; 18th Tactical Fighter Wing, 1964–66; 51st Fighter Interceptor Wing, 1955–57; 51st Fighter Interceptor Group, 1955–57; 51st Maintenance & Supply Group, 1955–57
- Conflicts: World War II; Vietnam War
- Awards: Air Force Distinguished Service Medal; Legion of Merit (2); Distinguished Flying Cross; Purple Heart; Meritorious Service Medal; Air Medal (5)
- Other work: Executive

Robert Leon Cardenas (March 10, 1920 – March 10, 2022) was a brigadier general in the United States Air Force.

== Early life ==
He was born in Mérida, Yucatán, Mexico. When he was five, his family moved to San Diego. He excelled in mathematics and physics in high school. When Cardenas was a teenager, building models and learning about gliders at Torrey Pines Gliderport first sparked his interest in airplanes. Due to his excellent grades, San Diego State University invited him to enroll.

== Military service ==
=== Pre-World War II ===
In 1939, while attending San Diego State, he decided to enlist as a private in the California National Guard. In 1940, Cardenas became an aviation cadet. He graduated, received his pilot wings and was commissioned a second lieutenant in the Army Air Corps in July 1941.

In 1942, Lt. Cardenas was sent to Twentynine Palms, California, to help establish the Army Air Corps Glider School. He was assigned to Wright Field, Ohio, and became a flight test officer. Cardenas rose quickly in position, was promoted to operations officer and finally director of the Flight Test Unit, Experimental Engineering Laboratory at Wright Field.

=== World War II ===
In 1944, he was assigned to the 506th Bombardment Squadron, 44th Bombardment Group, also known as the Flying Eightballs, based at RAF Shipdham in Norfolk, England. He flew his first mission on the B-24 Liberator "Southern Comfort" on January 24.

On March 18, Captain Cardenas was flying as Command Pilot for the 44th Bomb Group on his 20th mission. His airplane, the B-24 "Sack Artists" (serial number 42-100073), was shot down by German anti-aircraft fire. His attack run was supposed to target the Manzell Air Armaments factory in Friedrichshafen, Württemberg, Germany. However, the right wing was severely damaged by a shell and two engines were set on fire. According to his report relayed to the War Department, his number 2 engine was "hit by flak [and] on fire," causing the loss of 3,000 ft. altitude. Despite this damage he "Rejoined formation for [a] second [bomb] run." After this pass his "[numbers] 2 and 4 [engines were] on fire," and "[number] 3 [was] vibrating badly" in addition to "gas leaks," damage to bomb bays, wings, and electrical systems, and "hydraulics inoperative." Several members of the crew were also wounded, including Cardenas, who received a head injury when a piece of flak pierced his helmet. Since the plane was severely damaged and losing stability, 1st Lieutenant Raymond J. Lacombe decided to pilot the plane to Switzerland. Cardenas' crew all parachuted safely. The bomber then exploded at a low altitude and shore off the tops of several trees.

Capt. Cardenas landed on the German side of Lake Constance. He swam across the lake to the Swiss side in order to evade capture. He was first interned at a camp for American officers at Adelboden, and was later assigned to teach Swiss officers how to fly interned American bombers at Dübendorf Airfield near Zurich. On September 27, 1944, Cardenas escaped into France with the help of Swiss civilians and the French resistance. He was flown to Britain and then sent back to the United States to recover from his head injury.

In November 1944, he attended Central Instructors School for the B-24 at Smyrna Army Airfield, Tennessee. After graduation, he became a test pilot and was then assigned to Wright Field, Ohio. While at Wright Field, he attended Experimental Flight Test School and later became assistant chief of Bomber Section, and chief of Bomber Operations Section, Flight Test Division.

=== Post-war to retirement ===
In 1945, he started piloting experimental aircraft. He piloted a captured Luftwaffe jet fighter, the Messerschmitt Me 262, and the Arado Ar 234 jet bomber. Cardenas also piloted the XB-42 Mixmaster and XB-43 Jetmaster. He was assigned chief test pilot for bomber aircraft and flew all prototypes of that class for the next four years.

In 1947, he became the Officer in Charge of Operations and was the command pilot for the B-29 Superfortress that launched Captain Chuck Yeager in the Bell X-1 supersonic experimental aircraft.

Then in 1948, Major Cardenas was the Officer in Charge of Flight Test Division at Muroc Air Force Base and was Chief Air Force Test Pilot of the Northrop YB-49 flying wing. Cardenas later claimed that the YB-49 rotated backwards in stall, and that he warned Glen Edwards about it, who later died in a YB-49 crash. Jack Northrop claimed such a rotation was impossible. After a transcontinental flight in the YB-49, President Truman ordered Cardenas to do a flyby of Pennsylvania Avenue at rooftop level.

During the Korean War, he was assigned to Wright Field and Edwards Air Force Base testing new fighters and bombers. Additionally, he was assigned to Okinawa and then to The Pentagon.

During the Vietnam War, Cardenas flew F-105 Thunderchief combat missions and was then assigned to McConnell AFB as a trainer for the F-105.

In 1968, Colonel Cardenas was promoted to Brigadier General and assigned to command of the Air Force Special Operations Force at Eglin Air Force Base. Following his assignment to Eglin AFB, he became vice commander of the 16th Air Force in Spain. There he negotiated with Muammar al-Gaddafi the withdrawal of U.S. forces from Wheelus Air Base in Libya.

After his assignment in Spain, General Cardenas was assigned to Supreme Headquarters Allied Powers Europe (SHAPE) in Belgium. At SHAPE, he was the U.S. Deputy to LIVE OAK, a code name for joint military planning operation of the United States, Great Britain and France in response to the Soviet blockade and interference of Western access to Berlin. His final duty assignment was chief of national strategic Target List Division, Joint Strategic Target Planning Staff, at Offutt AFB, Nebraska.

He retired from the Air Force as a Brigadier General in 1973.

== Post-military career ==
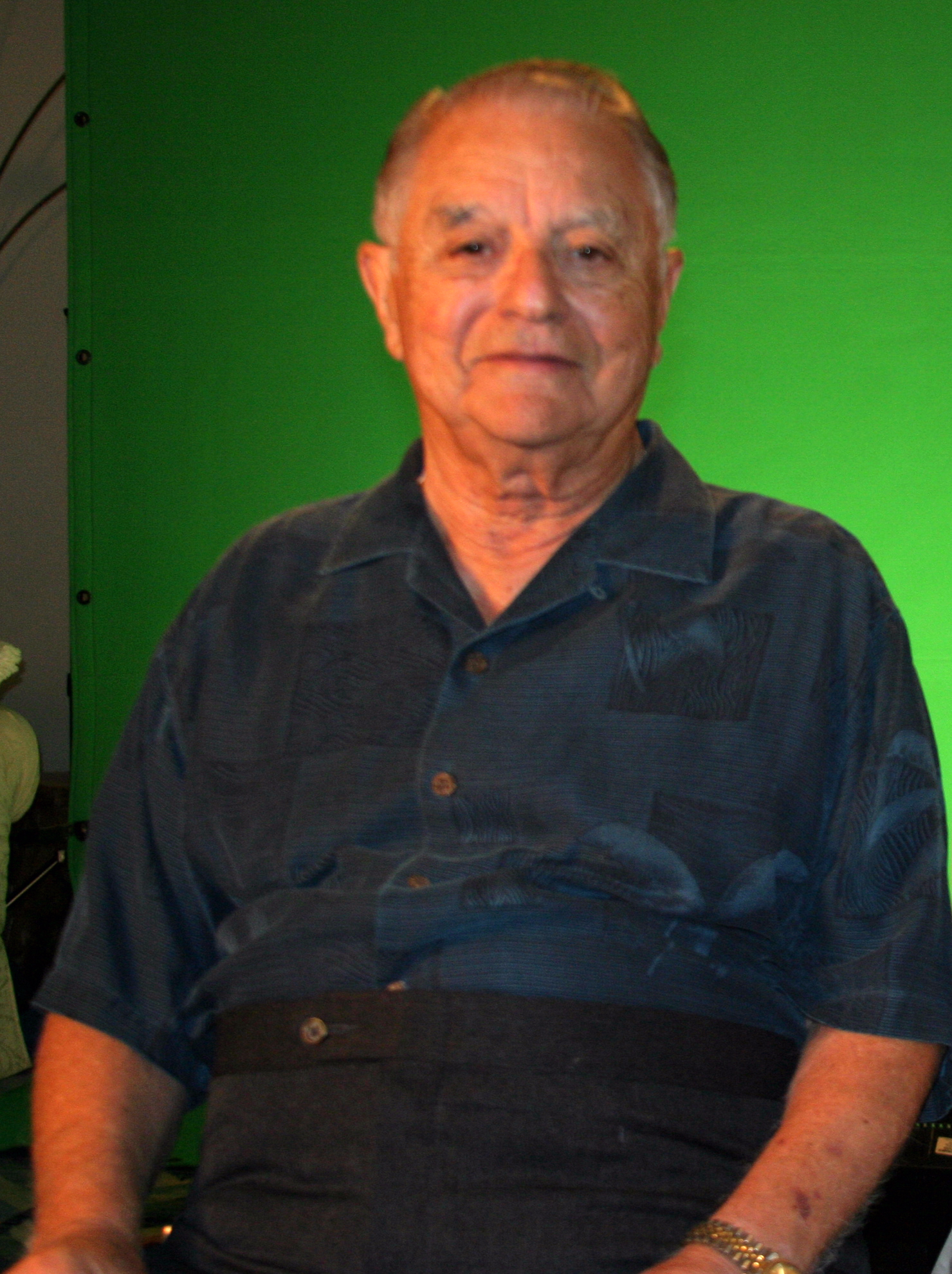
Bob Cardenas in 2007

Cardenas worked as an executive in the private sector. In 1983, President Ronald Reagan appointed him California coordinator for Southwest Border Economic Action Group. In 1985, he was appointed to chairman of the Juvenile Justice and Delinquency Prevention Advisory Group by California Governor George Deukmejian. He also served on the California Council of Criminal Justice. In 1987, Governor Deukmejian appointed General Cardenas to the California Veterans Board; he eventually became the chairman. In 1993, General Cardenas resigned from the California Veterans Board to serve as the chairman of the San Diego United Veterans Council and a director on the Board of Veterans Memorial Center & Museum, in San Diego.

Cardenas was later a member of the Veteran Administration's Memorials and Cemetery Committee. He was appointed to the committee by former VA Secretary Anthony Principi. He was also a trustee of the Flight Test Historical Foundation at Edwards AFB.

Cardenas lived in San Diego with his wife, Gladys, where he died on March 10, 2022, his 102nd birthday. He was buried with full military honors at Miramar National Cemetery.

== Military awards and decorations ==
United States (in order of precedence):

USAF Command pilot badge
Air Force Distinguished Service Medal
Legion of Merit with two bronze oak leaf clusters
Distinguished Flying Cross
Purple Heart
Meritorious Service Medal
Air Medal with four bronze oak leaf clusters
Joint Service Commendation Medal
Air Force Commendation Medal with bronze oak leaf clusters
Air Force Outstanding Unit Award with two bronze oak leaf clusters
American Defense Service Medal
American Campaign Medal
European-African-Middle Eastern Campaign Medal with three bronze campaign stars
World War II Victory Medal
National Defense Service Medal with bronze service star
Vietnam Service Medal with three bronze campaign stars
Air Force Longevity Service Award with one silver and two bronze oak leaf clusters
Republic of Vietnam Gallantry Cross
Vietnam Campaign Medal

Spain:

Cross of Aeronautical Merit

== Civilian honors ==
In 1993, the University of New Mexico's Department of Engineering honored him for his professional contribution and leadership.

In 1995, he was inducted into the Aerospace Walk of Fame in Lancaster, California, and the Sigma Chi fraternity awarded him the "Significant Sig" medal.

In 2004, he was honored as a Distinguished Alumnus of the U.S. Air Force Test Pilot School at Edwards AFB.

In 2008, Cardenas was inducted into the International Air & Space Hall of Fame at the San Diego Air & Space Museum.

In 2012, Cardenas was honored at the Air Command and Staff College's Gathering of Eagles at Maxwell Air Base, Montgomery, Alabama. This program encourages the study of airpower history by emphasizing the contributions of air and space pioneers.

In 2014, the National Aviation Hall of Fame announced that Cardenas will be inducted into the "Class of 2015" along with aviation pioneers Robert N. Hartzell, Gene Kranz, and Abe Silverstein.

== See also ==
- Hispanics in the United States Air Force
- Hispanic Americans in World War II
