= George J. Marrett =

American test pilot

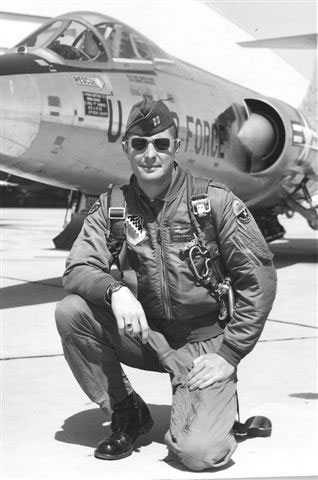
- George J. Marrett by F-104 (USAF Photo)
- Born: 1935 (age 90–91); Grand Island, Nebraska
- Military career
- Allegiance: United States of America
- Branch: United States Air Force
- Service years: 1957 - 1969
- Rank: Captain
- Units: 84th Fighter Interceptor Squadron; 602d Fighter Squadron (C)
- Awards: Distinguished Flying Cross; Air Medal
- Other work: Author, Trustee

George J. Marrett (born 1935) is a former United States Air Force officer, combat veteran, and test pilot. He is the author of many aviation-related books and articles.

== Early life ==
George Marrett was born in Grand Island, Nebraska in 1935. He was awarded the Eagle rank by the Boy Scouts in 1951. Marrett graduated in 1957 from Iowa State College in Ames, Iowa with a bachelor's degree in Chemistry. He entered the United States Air Force (USAF) as a Second Lieutenant from the Reserve Officers Training Corps. Marrett received pilot training at Webb Air Force Base in Texas where he flew the Lockheed T-33 Shooting Star. After graduation in 1959, he went to advanced flight training at Moody AFB in Georgia where he flew the North American F-86L Sabre. Marrett spent four years in the 84th Fighter Interceptor Squadron at Hamilton Air Force Base, California, flying the McDonnell F-101B Voodoo.

== Test pilot and combat veteran ==
Marrett was selected to attend the Aerospace Research Pilot School (ARPS), now called the U.S. Air Force Test Pilot School at Edwards Air Force Base, California. While at the school, Marrett flew a variety of aircraft including the Northrop T-38 Talon, Lockheed F-104 Starfighter and General Dynamics F-106 Delta Dart. After graduating with Class 64A, he was assigned to the Fighter Test Branch of Flight Test Operations at Edwards and completed three years flight-testing the McDonnell F-4C Phantom, Northrop F-5A Freedom Fighter, and General Dynamics F-111A Aardvark. Marrett flew during the heyday of flight test when many aviation record were set, such as Colonel Robert 'Silver Fox' Stephens' world speed record in the YF-12.

From 1968 to 1969, Marrett flew the Douglas A-1 Skyraider as a "Sandy" rescue pilot in the 602d Fighter Squadron (C), C for Commando, from Udorn and Nakhon Phanom Royal Thai Air Force Bases, Thailand.

He completed 188 combat missions with over 600 combat hours and was awarded the Distinguished Flying Cross with two Oak Leaf Clusters and the Air Medal with eight Oak Leaf Clusters. He was also awarded the Air Force Commendation Medal for flight test at Edwards AFB.

In 1969, Marrett returned from Vietnam and joined Hughes Aircraft Company as an experimental test pilot. For the next twenty years, he flew test programs which helped develop attack radar and missiles for the Grumman F-14 Tomcat, F-15 Eagle, F-16 Fighting Falcon, F-18 Hornet, and an early version of the B-2 Stealth bomber. He also flew test missions for the Hughes Aircraft AGM-65 Maverick missile. Marrett has flown over 40 types of military aircraft and logged over 9,500 hours.

== Sock It To 'Em ==
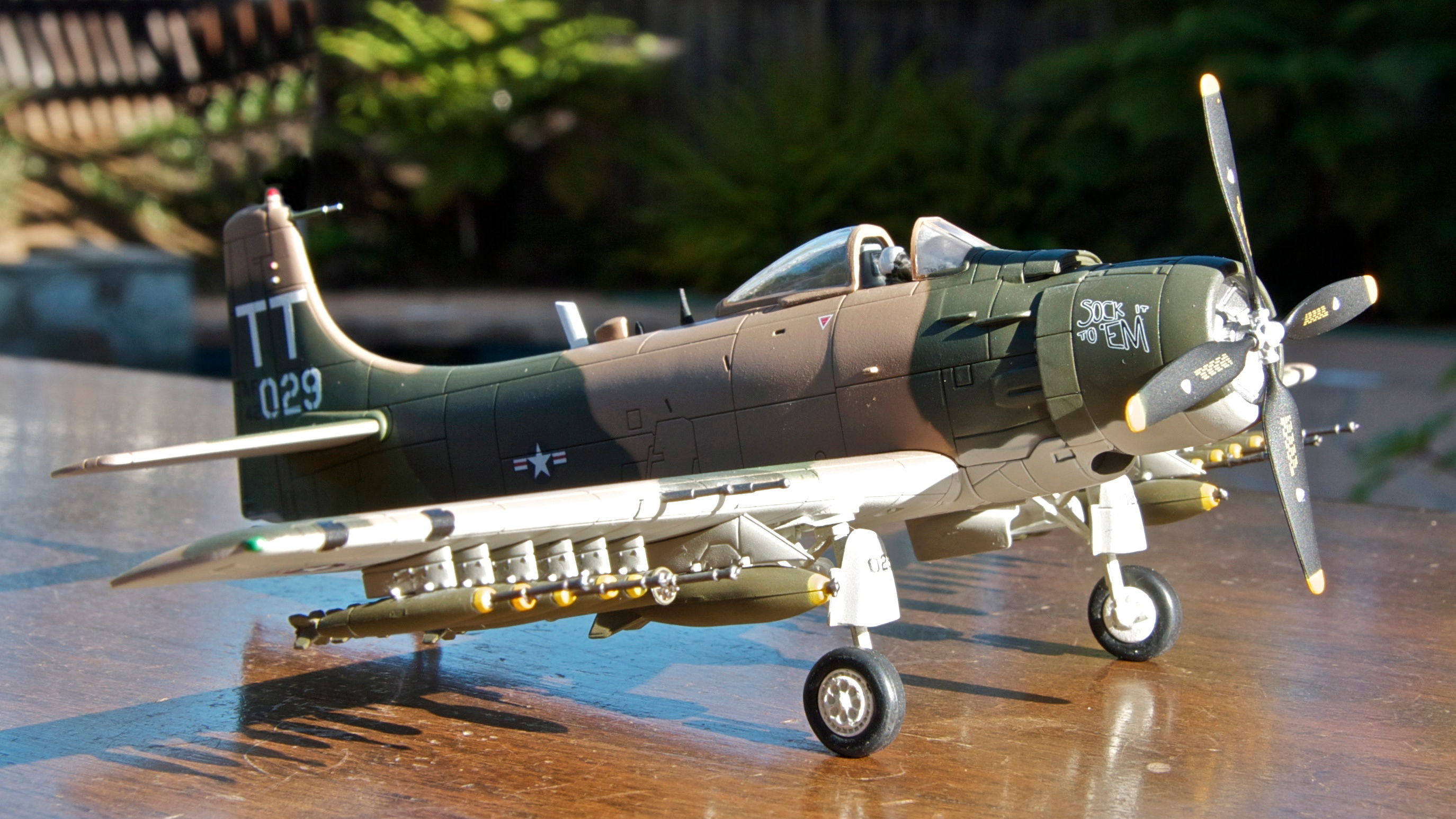
Model of Douglas A-1J "Sock It To 'Em"

Marrett's personal aircraft while serving with the 602d was an A-1J Skyraider, serial number 142029, maintained by crew chief Joseph Toback. The aircraft was named Sock It To 'Em after the popular 1960s comedy television program, Rowan & Martin's Laugh-In. Three weeks after Marrett and Tobak returned home, Sock It To 'Em was shot down by ground fire killing the pilot, Major James East, Jr. Forty-one years later, Marrett and Tobak were reunited at the Estrella Warbird Museum where they flew in Marrett's 1945 Stinson L-5 Sentinel that is also named Sock It To 'Em. The A-1 Skyraider, Sock It To 'Em, was memorialized as a plastic model by the Tamiya Corporation and a die-cast metal model by Hobby Master Limited.

== Later years ==
Marrett retired from Hughes Aircraft in 1989 and lives in Atascadero, California. He is one of the founders of the Estrella Warbird Museum at the Paso Robles airport, where he enjoys flying his privately owned plane, a 1945 Stinson L-5E Sentinel. He was the chief pilot for D. P. Industries from 2000 to 2013 flying their Beechcraft King Air C-90. Marrett was on the Board of Trustees of the National Test Pilot School in Mojave, California from 1983 to 2023.

Marrett has been married to his Nebraskan wife, Jan, for 67 years. They have a son Randall who is a retired Professor of Geology at the University of Texas at Austin and another son Scott who volunteered with the National Park Service in Idaho. They have four grandchildren Tyler Marrett, Zachary Marrett, Cali Marrett, and Casey Marrett.

== Publications ==
Marrett started his career as an aviation author by sending short stories to magazines. He has had nineteen articles published in aviation magazines about military flight test and his experiences in Vietnam. The following is an incomplete list of his works:

=== Books ===
- Cheating Death: Combat Air Rescues in Vietnam and Laos. Smithsonian Books. 2003. ISBN 1-58834-104-6.
- Howard Hughes: Aviator. Naval Institute Press. 2004. ISBN 1-59114-510-4.
- Testing Death: Hughes Aircraft Test Pilots and Cold War Weaponry. Praeger Security International. 2004. ISBN 0-275-99066-4.
- Contrails Over the Mojave: The Golden Age of Jet Flight Testing at Edwards Air Force Base. Naval Institute Press. 2008. ISBN 978-1-59114-511-0.
- If God is your Co-Pilot, Swap Seats. 48HRbooks. 2019. ISBN 978-0-578-22710-8.
- Homeless, Not Hopeless. 48HRbooks. 2022.

=== Articles ===
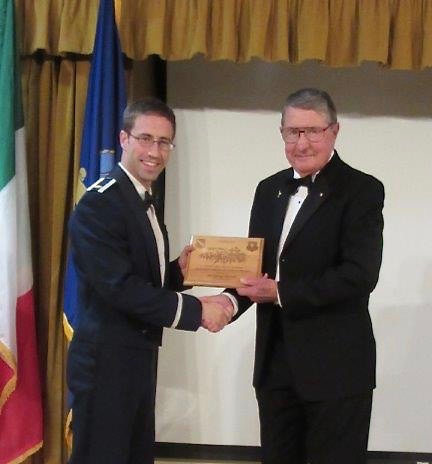
Major Philip Jackson presents the USAF TPS Distinguished Alumnus Award to George Marrett

- California Dreaming
- "Chasing the XB-70 Valkyrie". 456fis.org. Archived from the original on July 24, 2011.
- Defending the Golden Gate
- Don't Kill Yourself!
- The Jolly Gets An Assist
- F-101 Voodoo Curse
- Mach Buster
- SANDY to the Rescue
- Sky High in a Starfighter
- Sore Feet
- Space Cadets

== Honors ==
Marrett was inducted in the Nebraska Aviation Hall of Fame on January 26, 2006 in Kearney, Nebraska. He was elected to the Grand Island, Nebraska High School Wall of Honor and inducted in October 2007. Marrett joined the Society of Experimental Test Pilots in 1967, upgraded to Associate Fellow in 1981 and was elected a Fellow in 2011. On December 9, 2016 he received the USAF Test Pilot School Distinguished Alumnus award during the graduation ceremony for Class 2016A at Edwards AFB, California. This award is presented to a USAF TPS graduate who has made significant and lasting contributions to aviation science and the flight test community. In 2025, Marrett was presented with a Distinguished Veteran Award at the Faces of Freedom Memorial in Atascadero, California for his service as a USAF combat pilot.

== See also ==
- List of U.S. Air Force Test Pilot School alumni
