= Spence M. Armstrong =

United States Air Force general

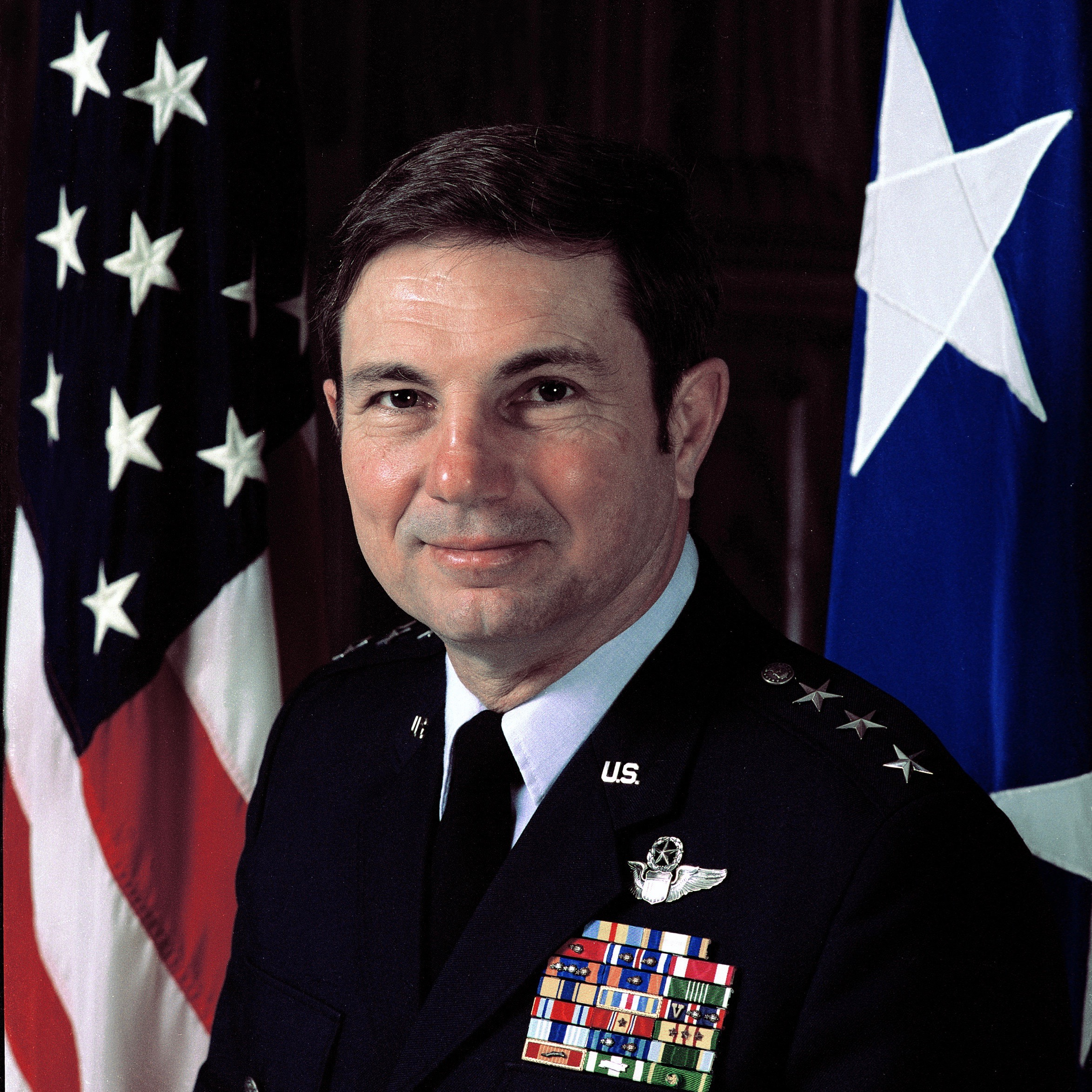
- Armstrong in 1987
- Nickname: "Sam"
- Born: 13 March 1934; Columbia, Tennessee, U.S.
- Died: 15 November 2025 (aged 91)
- Allegiance: United States of America
- Branch: United States Air Force
- Service years: 1956–90 (34 years)
- Rank: Lieutenant general
- Commands: Vice Cmdr, AFSC; Vice Cmdr, MAC; US Military Training Mission; Air Force Military Training Center; 80th Flying Training Wing
- Conflicts: Vietnam War
- Awards: Defense Distinguished Service Medal; Air Force Distinguished Service Medal; Legion of Merit; Distinguished Flying Cross
- Other work: NASA

Spence M. "Sam" Armstrong (13 March 1934 – 15 November 2025) was a retired three-star general, combat veteran, and test pilot in the United States Air Force (USAF). In his thirty-four years of military service, he served in command assignments at five different levels in the USAF and retired as vice commander of Air Force Systems Command.

Armstrong spent eleven more years as a senior executive at the National Aeronautics and Space Administration (NASA) leading the agency's human resources efforts and programs with academia.

== Early life ==
Armstrong was born in 1934 in Columbia, Tennessee, and graduated from Hay Long High School in 1951. He spent a year at Vanderbilt University before entering the United States Naval Academy in Annapolis, Maryland. In 1956, he graduated with distinction earning a Bachelor of Science degree in engineering. Armstrong accepted his commission as a second lieutenant in the United States Air Force.

== Military career ==
Armstrong earned his pilot's wings in 1957 after completing flight training at Greenville Air Force Base in Mississippi. He attended F-86 Sabre gunnery school at Williams AFB, Arizona, followed by F-100 Super Sabre gunnery school at Nellis AFB, Nevada. In April 1958, Armstrong was assigned to the 356th Tactical Fighter Squadron at Myrtle Beach AFB in South Carolina. After three years flying F-100s, he attended the University of Michigan, where he earned master's degrees in astronautical engineering and instrumentation engineering. In 1963, Armstrong was assigned to Holloman AFB in New Mexico, where he served as a guidance and control engineer.

=== Flight test and Vietnam ===
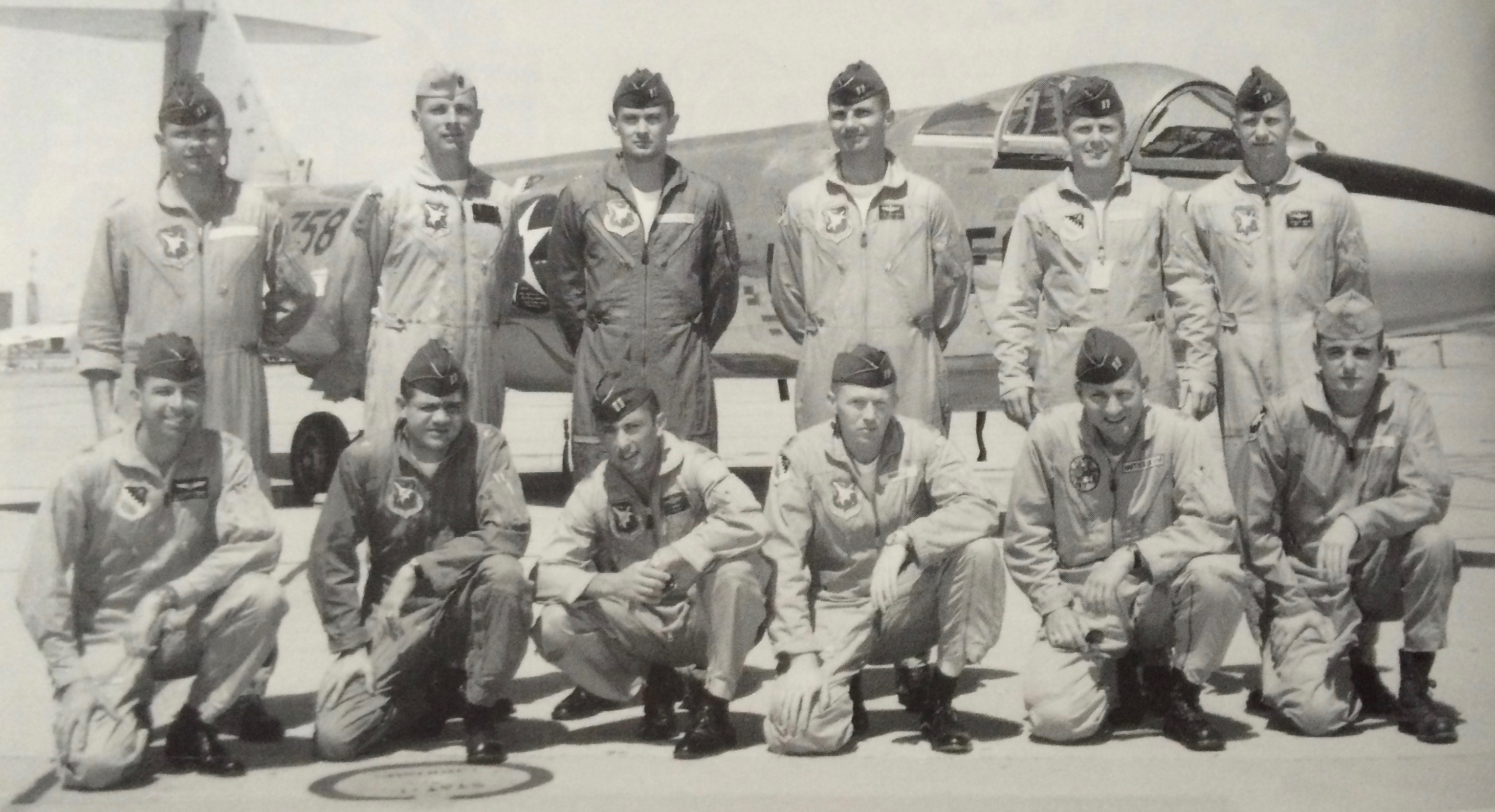
USAF TPS Class 64C. Armstrong is standing, fourth from the left

In 1964, Armstrong was selected to attend the Aerospace Research Pilot School (now known as the U.S. Air Force Test Pilot School) at Edwards AFB, California. He graduated with Class 64C, the third class to start in 1964. In 1965, Armstrong was assigned as the F-106 Delta Dart test project officer at Holloman AFB. After two years in flight test, Armstrong prepared for a combat tour in Southeast Asia by completing F-105 Thunderchief combat crew training at McConnell AFB, Kansas. He was assigned to the 34th Fighter Squadron based at Korat Royal Thai Air Force Base, Thailand where he flew 100 combat missions during the Vietnam War in the F-105. In July 1968, Armstrong returned to flight test as an instructor and later as the deputy commandant at the Aerospace Research Pilot School.

=== Training commands ===
In August 1971, Armstrong attended the Air War College at Maxwell AFB, Alabama and graduated in May 1972. After a tour as the senior USAF representative at the United States Army Infantry School at Fort Benning, Georgia, Armstrong was assigned in 1973 to the 12th Flying Training Wing as the base commander at Randolph AFB, Texas. In July 1974, he became the commanding officer of the 80th Flying Training Wing at Sheppard AFB. Armstrong returned to academia in 1976–78 to complete senior management courses at Columbia University in New York City and Harvard University in Cambridge, Massachusetts. In April 1978, Armstrong was assigned to USAF headquarters in Washington, D.C., as director for program integration. He then served as the deputy director of space systems and command, control and communications before returning to Randolph AFB in 1980 as the deputy chief of staff for technical training. Armstrong was then assigned as commander of the Air Force Military Training Center, Lackland AFB, Texas.

=== Final military years ===
In August 1983, during the Iran–Iraq War, Armstrong was assigned as chief of the joint United States Military Training Mission whose mission is to train, advise, and assist the Saudi Arabian Army. After two years in this assignment, he was promoted to lieutenant general and served as vice commander of Military Airlift Command at Scott AFB, Illinois. In July 1987, Armstrong was assigned as vice commander of Air Force Systems Command at Andrews AFB in Maryland. In April 1990, after 34 years of military service, Armstrong retired from the United States Air Force.

== NASA career ==
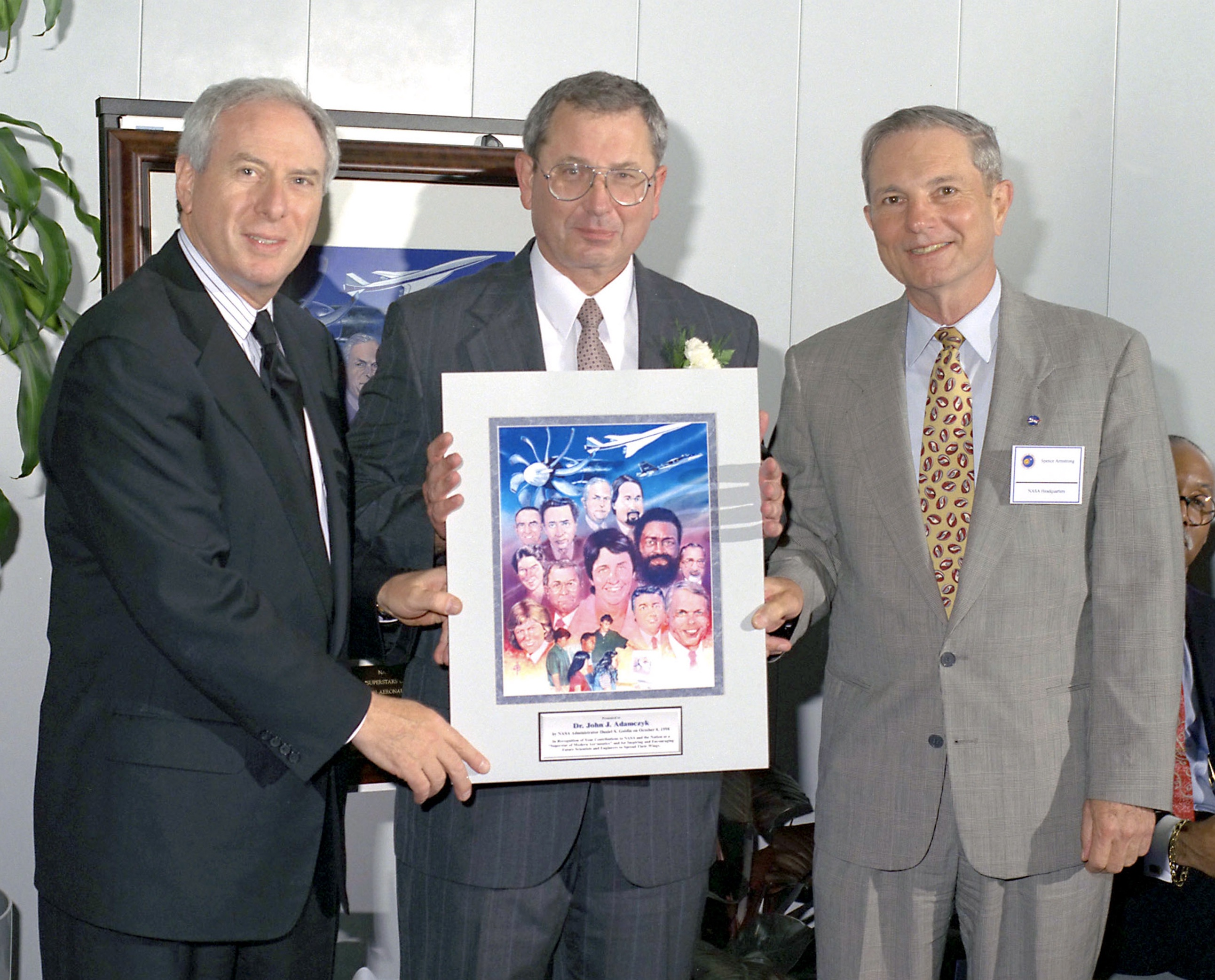
Dan Goldin, John Adamczyk, and Spence Armstrong at NASA's Turning Goals Into Reality aviation conference

After retiring from military service, Armstrong joined President George H. W. Bush's Space Exploration Initiative as director of program architecture for the Synthesis Group that was charged with developing architectures to return astronauts to the Moon and then to Mars. In 1991, he was named associate administrator for the National Aeronautics and Space Administration's Human Resources and Education office where he helped create industry-recognized programs for the development of executives and program managers.

In 1998, Armstrong was named associate administrator for the Office of Aerospace and Space Transportation Technology responsible for measuring progress on NASA's ten goals that supported the three pillars of global civil aviation, revolutionary technology, and access to space. At the Turning Goals Into Reality aviation conference, he hosted a celebration of individual and team accomplishments toward these goals.

General Armstrong has served this nation with exceptional distinction during both his military and NASA careers.

— Sean O'Keefe, NASA Administrator

In 2000, Armstrong was named senior advisor to the NASA administrator. Armstrong directed the agency's efforts to find new ways of increasing participation with universities and industry. Armstrong's areas of responsibilities included export control, information technology, security, and grants. He initiated and moderated a series of interactive webcasts with universities and colleges that included presentations of new partnership opportunities with NASA and question-and-answer sessions with agency leaders. After three years in charge of university programs for NASA and eleven years with the agency, Armstrong retired on December 31, 2002.

== Personal life ==
As of 2002, Armstrong and wife Beth (née Webb) have two children and four grandchildren. In his career, he flew over 50 different types of aircraft and logged over 4,500 hours of flying time. As of 2014, Armstrong remained active in aviation sharing his experiences with the public. Armstrong died in Fort Belvoir, Virginia, on November 15, 2025, at the age of 91.

== Honors ==
=== Decorations ===
Armstrong was awarded the following decorations for his military service.

Insignia	Command pilot		
Row 1	Defense Distinguished Service Medal w/ 1 oak leaf cluster		Air Force Distinguished Service Medal
Row 2	Legion of Merit w/ 1 oak leaf cluster	Distinguished Flying Cross w/ 2 oak leaf clusters	Meritorious Service Medal
Row 3	Air Medal w/ 11 oak leaf clusters	Air Medal w/ 1 oak leaf cluster	Army Commendation Medal
Row 4	Air Force Commendation Medal	Joint Meritorious Unit Award	Air Force Outstanding Unit Award w/ valor device and 2 oak leaf clusters
Row 5	Combat Readiness Medal	National Defense Service Medal w/ service star	Vietnam Service Medal w/ 3 service stars
Row 6	Air Force Overseas Short Tour Service Ribbon	Air Force Longevity Service Award with six oak leaf clusters	Small Arms Expert Marksmanship Ribbon
Row 7	Republic of Vietnam Gallantry Cross with Palm	Republic of Vietnam Campaign Medal	Saudi Arabian King Abdelaziz Badge (Second Grade)

=== Other honors ===
During his career at NASA, Armstrong was awarded the Presidential Rank of Meritorious Executive, the NASA Outstanding Leadership Medal, and the NASA Exceptional Service Medal. He was awarded an honorary doctor of laws degree from the University of Akron in Ohio.

== See also ==
- Air Education and Training Command
- List of U.S. Air Force Test Pilot School alumni
- List of United States Naval Academy alumni
- NASA awards and decorations
- National Space Grant College and Fellowship Program
- Reusable launch system
