= Hartzell Propeller =

American aircraft parts manufacturer

- Industry: Aerospace
- Founded: 1917
- Founder: Robert Hartzell
- Headquarters: Piqua, Ohio, United States
- Key people: Joe Brown (Chairman)
- Products: Aircraft propellers
- Divisions: Tanis Aircraft Products

Hartzell Propeller is an American manufacturer that was founded in 1917 by Robert N. Hartzell as the Hartzell Walnut Propeller Company. It produces composite and aluminum propellers for certified, homebuilt, and ultralight aircraft. The company is headquartered in Piqua, Ohio.

Hartzell also produces spinners, governors, ice protection systems, and other propeller controls.

== History ==
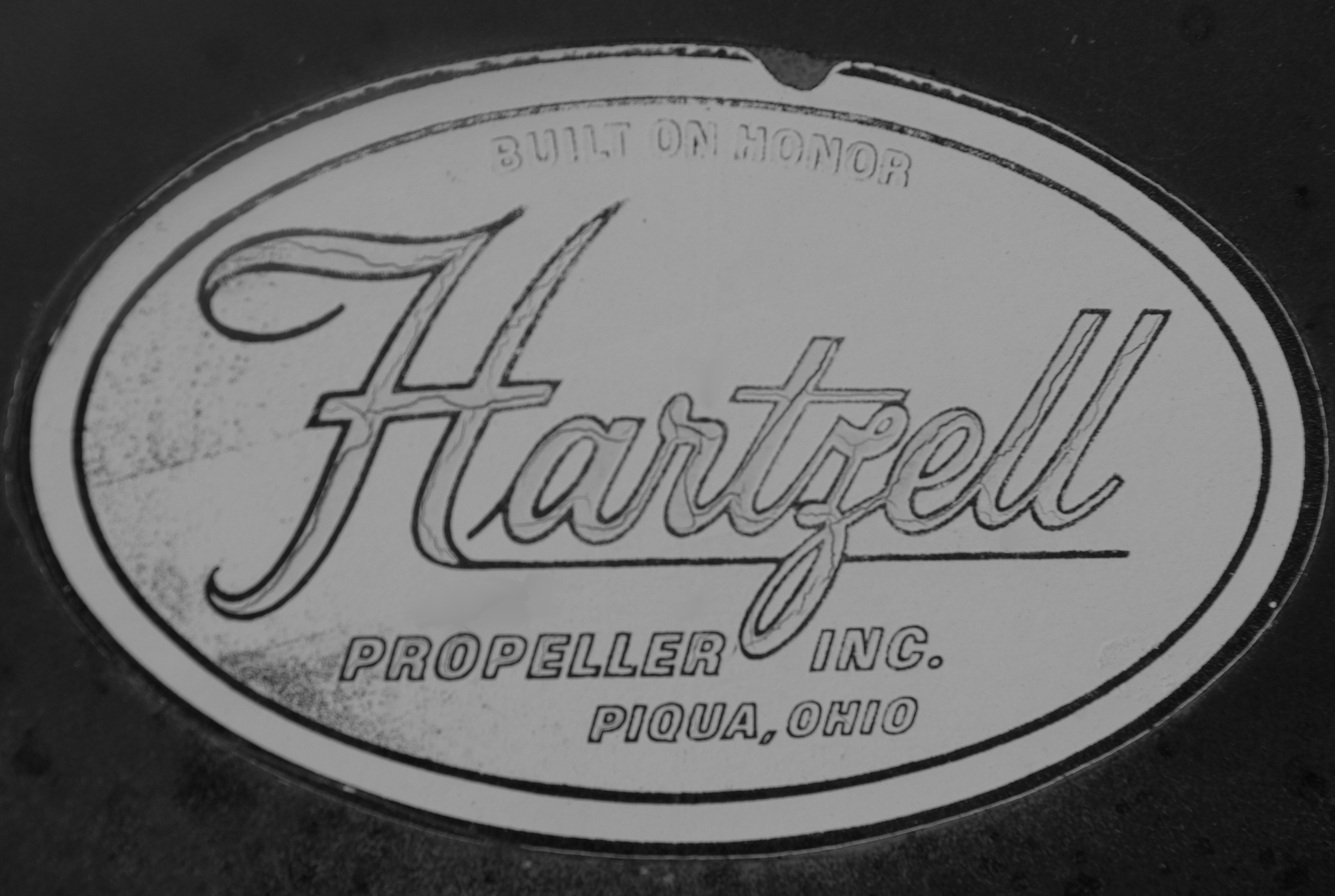
Old company logo

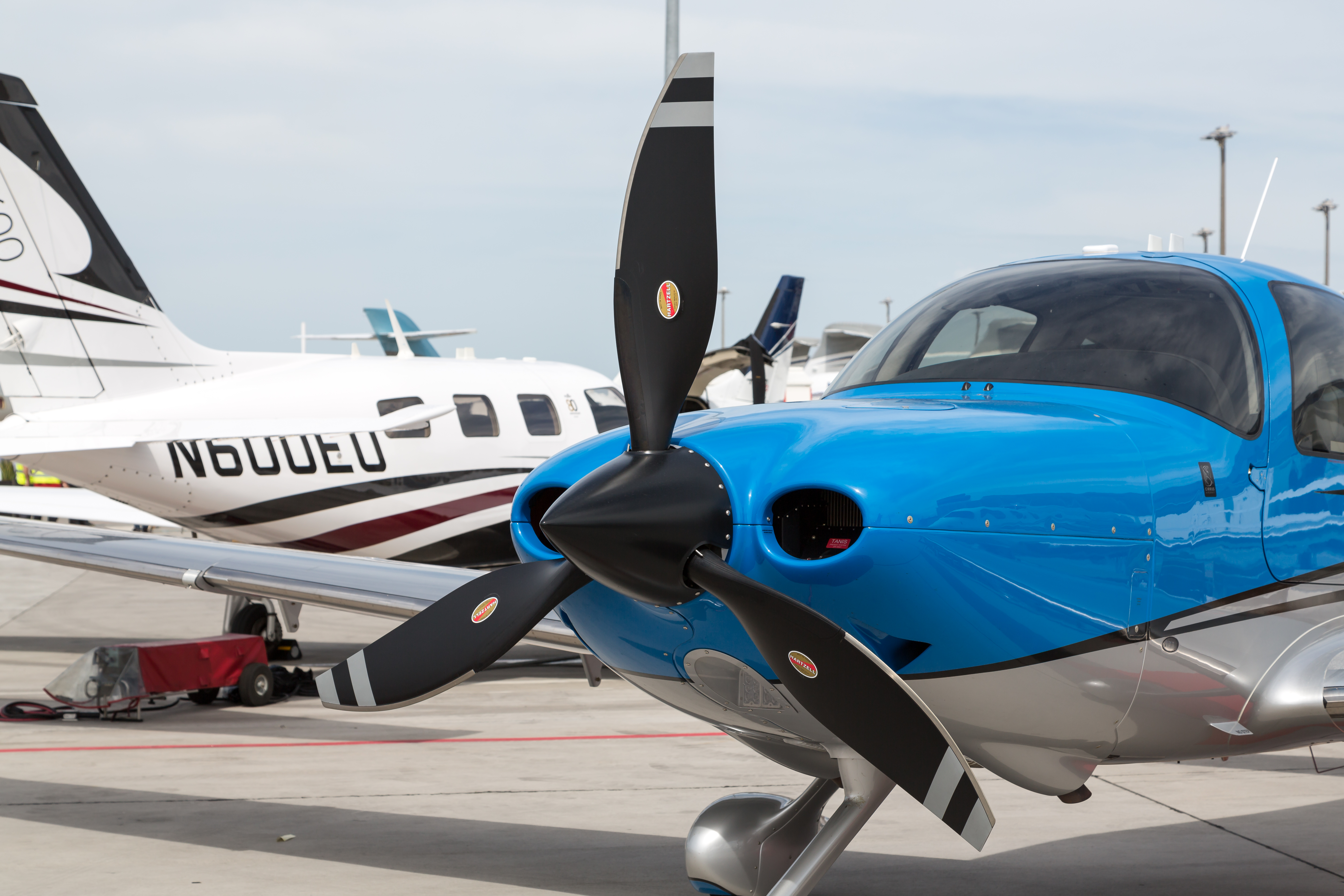
A Hartzell propeller on a Cirrus SR22T in 2018

Robert Hartzell grew up in the village of Oakwood, Ohio, just a block from Hawthorn Hill, where Orville Wright lived. From the 1890s until the late 1910s, Hartzell's father and grandfather operated a sawmill and lumber supply company in Greenville, Ohio (later moved to Piqua, Ohio) that also manufactured items such as wagons and gun stocks for World War I. On the side, Robert owned a small airplane and did maintenance on it as a young man. In 1917, Orville Wright suggested that Hartzell use his walnut trees to manufacture an aircraft propeller for his plane and others. Robert Hartzell founded the Hartzell Walnut Propeller Company in Piqua that year, and the company provided "Liberty" aircraft propellers for World War I warplanes.

After the war, Hartzell Propeller built its own airplanes, including the FC-1 (the first aircraft made entirely of plywood). The FC-1 took first place in the Flying Club of St. Louis Trophy Race at the 1923 International Air Meet. An alteration to the wings resulted in the improved FC-2 model, which won competing over aircraft from the Waco Aircraft Company and the Curtiss Aeroplane and Motor Company at the 1924 International Air Races in Dayton, Ohio. Hartzell stopped producing aircraft to avoid competing with its own propeller customers. In 1926, Hartzell began building propellers for the Aeronca C-2.

During World War II the company produced metal propellers for Hamilton-Standard. After the war, Hartzell produced the first composite propellers for the Republic RC-3 Seabee. Hartzell began making aluminum propellers in 1948 and developed the first full-feathering propellers for a light twin-engine aircraft in the 1950s. These were used in the Aero Commander, Piper Apache, Cessna 310, and Beech Twin Bonanza.

Hartzell introduced a turboprop propeller in 1961 and, in 1975, certified a 5-bladed propeller for the Short 330. It acquired Decatur Industries, a wood product manufacturer, in 1969 and the Arkansas Face Veneer Company in 1971. In 1978, the company produced a composite aramid fiber propeller for the CASA 212. In 1989, Hartzell produced sixteen-foot propellers for the Boeing Condor, another record-breaking aircraft.

Hartzell introduced "Top-Prop" replacement propellers for piston-engine aircraft in 1991 and sold 20,000 Top-Prop conversion kits through 2013.

In 1994, the company held the first Friends of Hartzell Air Show in Piqua, Ohio for which Hartzell developed its first aerobatic system. The company opened a 27,000 square feet (2,500 m^{2}) expansion to its headquarters in August 1996. In 2013, the Red Bull Air Race World Championship chose Hartzell to provide 3-blade composite propellers, carbon-fiber composite spinners, and governors to race teams. In 2006, the FAA granted Hartzell the first certification for an Advanced Structural Composite (ASC II) propeller for general aviation.

In July 2021, Hartzell Propeller purchased the assets of Tanis Aircraft Products, a company that makes aircraft engine pre-heat systems. Tanis President and CEO Douglas Evink became Hartzell Propeller's vice president of sales for the new Tanis business unit, and the Tanis operations remained near Anoka County Airport, outside Minneapolis, Minnesota.

In late 2023, the company was sold to private equity firm Arcline Investment Management. It opened its first location in India in 2024.

== See also ==
- List of aircraft propeller manufacturers
