= Robert N. Hartzell =

Robert Norris Hartzell (3 June 1896, Ohio - 11 December 1968) was an American entrepreneur who started Hartzell Propeller in 1917, a company that produces aircraft propellers.

== Life and work ==
=== Background ===
Robert N. Hartzell studied to be an engineer at the University of Cincinnati, but quit his studies in 1917 to help his father in his lumber business.

=== Plane propellers ===
An embargo enforced by the First World War made access to goods problematic, and the firm had to improvise. They changed production to rifle flasks, while also delivering lumber to companies that produced plane propellers. Orville Wright, who lived nearby, and knew of Hartzell's interest in planes and flying, suggested that the company started producing plane propellers themselves. Hartzell started doing this, and received an order from the US Navy for propellers for Liberty engines, the most common plane motor of the time.

The war ended, and orders dried up. Hartzell began production of its first plane, the FC-1. The plywood plane participated in a race in 1923 which it won. An improved model, the FC-2, won a second race the following year. However, Hartzell found it problematic to compete against his own customers, and to combine production of propellers with aircraft.

From the 1920s, the company again explored alternative ways of making money. He had heard that there was money in ceiling fans, and founded the Hartzell Propeller Fan Company. The company also made cabinets for radios and record players, and car wheels. At the same time, the company received orders from the Navy for propellers for the airships Macon and Shenandoah.

With the Second World War came new opportunities and orders from the defence forces. Hartzell moved over from walnut propellers to metal for Curtiss-Wright and Hamilton Standard. After the war, he became the market leader in propellers with variable pitch made from aluminium, while also creating propeller blades from composite materials. In 1949 he patented the composite Hartzite.

Thought to be lightweight and low cost, Harzell's propeller was the market leader in the 60s and 70s, with a market share of over 90% of two-engined small planes.

Hartzell died in 1968.

In 2015 he was inducted into the National Aviation Hall of Fame.
