= Mir-22 =

Precursor microRNA family

mir-22
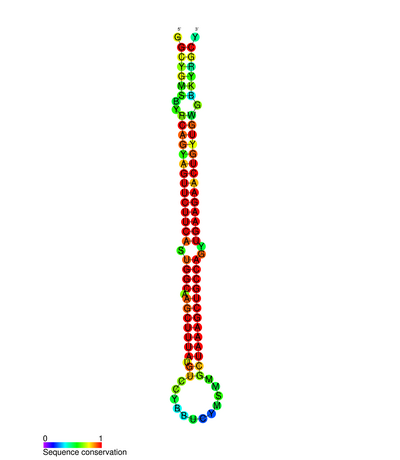
- miR-22 microRNA secondary structure and sequence conservation

Identifiers
- Symbol: mir-22
- Rfam: RF00653
- miRBase family: MIPF0000053
- NCBI Gene: 407004
- HGNC: 31599
- OMIM: 612077

Other data
- RNA type: microRNA
- Domain(s): Eukaryota; Euteleostomi
- PDB structures: PDBe

In molecular biology mir-22 microRNA is a short RNA molecule. MicroRNAs are an abundant class of molecules, approximately 22 nucleotides in length, which can post-transcriptionally regulate gene expression by binding to the 3' UTR of mRNAs expressed in a cell.

== Origins ==
Mir-22 was originally identified in HeLa cells (an immortal cell line derived from cervical cancer cells), but was later found to be ubiquitously expressed in various tissues. The gene encoding miR-22 is found on the short arm of chromosome 17, in a minimal loss of heterozygosity region. It is highly conserved across many vertebrate species, including chimp, mouse, rat, dog and horse. This level of conservation suggests functional importance. MiR-22 was previously identified as having a role in erythrocyte maturation.

== Role in cancer ==
The deregulation of many miRNAs has been shown to have a role in oncogenesis. Mir-22 was found to be over-expressed in prostate cancer but down-regulated in breast cancer, cholangiocarcinoma, multiple myeloma and hepatocellular carcinoma. Mir-22 expression was associated with survival in multiple breast cancer datasets.

== Targets ==
Specifically, miR-22 can function as a tumour suppressor. One known target is histone deacetylase 4 (HDAC4), which is known to have a critical role in cancer development. Mir-22 also targets Myc Binding Protein (MYCBP). This prevents transcription of c-Myc target genes by silencing c-MYCBP. However, c-Myc also inhibits expression of miR-22 in a positive feedback loop. When this spirals out of control, it can cause uncontrolled cell proliferation.

== Possible therapy ==
Expression of miR-22 can be induced by adding 12-O-Tetradecanoylphorbol-13-acetate (TPA) to HL-60 cells (leukaemia cell line). The enforced expression causes the growth of cancer cells to slow down. This means that miR-22 could be a potential target for cancer therapies.

== See also ==
- MicroRNA
