= Donald S. Lopez Sr. =

USAF pilot (1923–2008)

Donald Sewell Lopez Sr.
- Don Lopez as a USAAF fighter pilot in China, World War II
- Born: July 15, 1923; Brooklyn, New York
- Died: March 3, 2008 (aged 84); Durham, North Carolina
- Burial place: Arlington National Cemetery
- Relatives: Donald S. Lopez Jr. (son)
- Military career
- Allegiance: United States
- Branch: United States Air Force
- Service years: 1942–1964
- Rank: Lieutenant colonel
- Units: 75th FS, 23rd Fighter Group; 4th Fighter-Interceptor Wing
- Conflicts: World War II; Korean War
- Awards: Silver Star; Distinguished Flying Cross (2); Soldier's Medal; Air Medal (3)
- Other work: Deputy Director of the National Air and Space Museum

Donald Sewell Lopez Sr. (July 15, 1923 – March 3, 2008) was a United States Army Air Forces and United States Air Force fighter and test pilot and until his death the deputy director of the Smithsonian National Air and Space Museum.

== Early life ==
Lopez was born in Brooklyn, New York on July 15, 1923. He showed an interest in aviation at an early age. He often rode his bike to Floyd Bennett Field where he occasionally got free flights from a family friend. During his teenage years, his family moved to Tampa, Florida, inside the traffic pattern of Drew Army Air Field, so he could see Army Air Corps fighters flying overhead. That hardened his resolve to become a fighter pilot.

== Military career ==
Lopez learned to fly in college, then volunteered for the Army Air Forces Aviation Cadet Program when the age limit was lowered to 18 in early 1942.

=== World War II ===
After earning his wings, he saw combat in China as a member of the 75th Fighter Squadron. The unit was part of the 23rd Fighter Group, successor to the famed Flying Tigers. He became an ace, credited with shooting down five Japanese fighters, four in a P-40 Warhawk and one in a P-51 Mustang, while flying 101 missions.

=== Post war ===
Lopez returned to Florida in 1945 and served as a fighter test pilot at Eglin Field, flying most of the early jet fighters. He served a brief tour of duty in the Korea War in August and September 1950 as an F-86 Sabre pilot with the 4th Fighter-Interceptor Wing. After Korea, he served two tours in the Pentagon, earned a B.S. and M.S. in aeronautical engineering, and was an associate professor of thermodynamics at the United States Air Force Academy, until his retirement from the Air Force in 1964.

== Personal life ==
In 1948 he married Glindel Barron, sister of Florida State Senator Dempsey Barron. He and Glindel have two children, Joy Lopez and Donald S. Lopez Jr. (currently a professor of Buddhist studies at the University of Michigan), and one grandchild, Laura V. Lopez.

== Later life ==
Following his retirement from the Air Force in 1964, he spent eight years as an engineer on the Apollo and Skylab programs with Bellcomm, Inc., a subsidiary of Bell Labs. In 1972, he joined the staff of the National Air and Space Museum. He was heavily involved in developing and running the National Air and Space Museum, during his later years.

His publications include two memoirs, Into the Teeth of the Tiger (Smithsonian, 1997, ISBN 1-56098-752-9), and Fighter Pilot's Heaven: Flight Testing the Early Jets (Smithsonian, 2001, ISBN 1-56098-916-5).

Lopez died from a heart attack on March 3, 2008, at Duke University Medical Center in Durham, North Carolina, near to where his daughter lived. He is buried with full military honors at Arlington National Cemetery in Arlington, Virginia.

== Awards and decorations ==
His awards and decorations include:

USAF Command Pilot
Silver Star
| Distinguished Flying Cross with bronze oak leaf cluster | Soldier's Medal | Air Medal with 2 bronze oak leaf clusters |
| American Campaign Medal | Asiatic-Pacific Campaign Medal with bronze campaign star | World War II Victory Medal |
| National Defense Service Medal with bronze service star | Korean Service Medal | Air Force Longevity Service Award with 4 bronze oak leaf clusters |
| United Nations Korea Medal | Republic of China War Memorial Medal | Republic of Korea War Service Medal |

== See also ==
- Hispanics in the United States Air Force
- Hispanic Americans in World War II
