= List of SETP members =

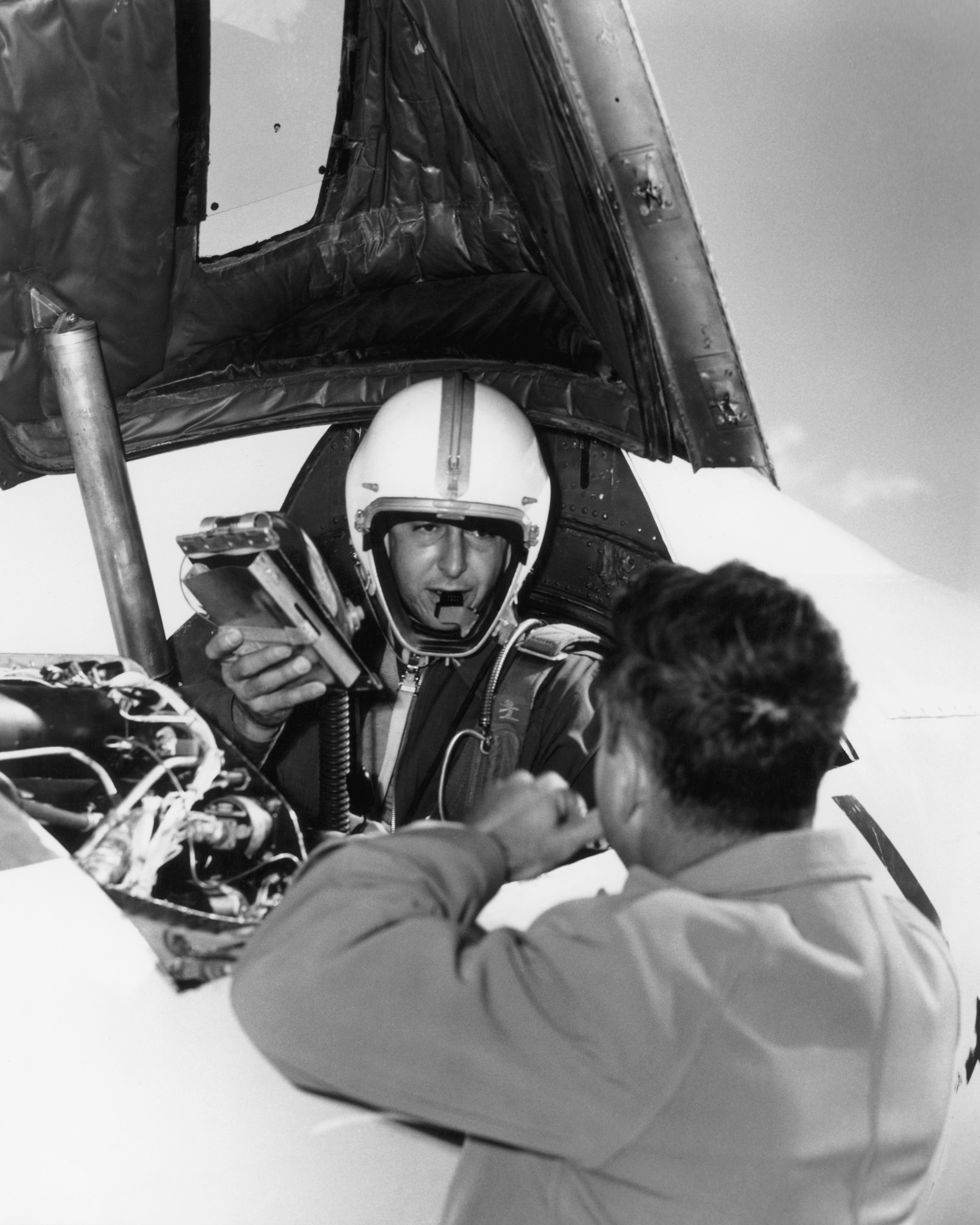
SETP charter member Scott Crossfield in the cockpit of the second Douglas D-558-2 Skyrocket built (NACA 144) just after the first ever flight to exceed Mach 2 on November 20, 1953

The Society of Experimental Test Pilots (SETP) is an international organization dedicated to improving air safety by supporting the education and professional development of test pilots. The society promotes sound aeronautical design and development techniques and encourages the exchange of ideas among its members. SETP was initially formed in 1955 by a small group of US civilian test pilots at a café near Edwards Air Force Base and as of 2022 has grown to include over 2,400 members from over thirty countries. The society hosts symposia and workshops in the United States, Canada, Europe, and India. Member success is recognized and celebrated by yearly awards in areas including flight test performance, technical management, and flight test safety. The society publishes a record of its activities in Cockpit magazine.

== Notable members and friends ==
The following tables are drawn from living and deceased society members, honorary fellows, former members, and friends of the society.

=== Key ===
Status
Status	AF	Recognized as an associate fellow of SETP
Status	AM	Recognized as an associate member of SETP
Status	CM	Recognized as a charter or founding member of SETP
Status	F	Recognized as a fellow of SETP
Status	FR	Recognized as a friend of SETP
Status	HF	Recognized as an honorary fellow of SETP
Status	M	Recognized as a member of SETP
Status	P	Served as a president of SETP

=== Members ===
The following table contains current members of the society and those who were members at the time of their death.

* Individual was killed in an aviation-related accident.

Name	Country	Status	Notability
Chuck Aaron	(United States)	M	Helicopter flight test and aerobatics
Michael J. Adams*	(United States)	M	1965 USAF MOL Group, X-15 Flight 191
Buzz Aldrin	(United States)	M	Gemini 12, Apollo 11, USAF Test Pilot School commandant
Andrew M. Allen	(United States)	M	STS-46, STS-62, STS-75
William Anders	(United States)	M	Apollo 8
Bud Anderson	(United States)	F	Triple ace of World War II, FICON project
Joseph T. Anderson	(United States)	M	Harrier jump jet testing, deputy director of Steven F. Udvar-Hazy Center
Neil Armstrong	(United States)	CM, F	X-15, Gemini 8, Apollo 11, first person to walk on the Moon
Michael A. Baker	(United States)	M	LTV A-7 Corsair II, STS-43, STS-52, STS-68, STS-81
Charles Bassett*	(United States)	AM	NASA Astronaut Group 3
Alan Bean	(United States)	M	Apollo 12, Skylab 3
Bill Bedford	(United Kingdom)	F	First flights of the Hawker P.1127, Kestrel, and Harrier
Robert Behler	(United States)	F	Former Director, Operational Test and Evaluation
John E. Blaha	(United States)	M	STS-29, STS-33, STS-43, STS-58, STS-79 (up), STS-81 (down)
Brian Binnie	(United States)	AF	SpaceShipOne flight 17P to win Ansari X Prize
Karol J. Bobko	(United States)	F	STS-6, STS-51-D, STS-51-J
Eric A. Boe	(United States)	M	STS-126, STS-133
Vance D. Brand	(United States)	F	Apollo–Soyuz Test Project, STS-5, STS-41-B, STS-35
Daniel Brandenstein	(United States)	M	STS-8, STS-51-G, STS-32, STS-49
Bill Bridgeman*	(United States)	CM, M	D-558-II speed and altitude records, X-3 testing
James E. Brown III	(United States)	P, F	F-117 and F-22 flight test, National Test Pilot School president
John S. Bull	(United States)	M	1966 NASA Group 5
Robert D. Cabana	(United States)	F	STS-41, STS-53, STS-65, STS-88
Robert Cardenas	(United States)	M	B-29 pilot for sound barrier mission, YB-49 testing
Marion E. Carl	(United States)	F	Triple ace of World War II, D-558/I/II testing and record attempts
Gerald Carr	(United States)	M	Skylab 4
Sonny Carter*	(United States)	M	STS-33
John Casper	(United States)	M	STS-36, STS-54, STS-62, STS-77
Gene Cernan	(United States)	F	Gemini 9A, Apollo 10, Apollo 17
John Christiansen	(Norway) (United States)	F	First flights of S-3 and P-3
Michael Coats	(United States)	M	STS-41-D, STS-29, STS-39
Kenneth Cockrell	(United States)	M	STS-56, STS-69, STS-80, STS-98, STS-111
Chuck Coleman	(United States)	AF	Airshow and test pilot on the BD-10, BD-12, and Proteus
James F. Coleman	(United States)	CM, M	First flight of the Convair XFY Pogo
Michael Collins	(United States)	M	Gemini 10, Apollo 11
Pete Conrad	(United States)	F	Gemini 5, Gemini 11, Apollo 12, Skylab 2
David P. Cooley*	(United States)	AF	Flight test of F-117 and F-22
Gordon Cooper	(United States)	AF	Mercury-Atlas 9, Gemini 5
Darrell Cornell*	(United States)	M	Flight test and demonstration of the F-20
Joseph F. Cotton	(United States)	M	First flight of the XB-70
Richard O. Covey	(United States)	F	STS-51-I, STS-26, STS-38, STS-61
Albert H. Crews	(United States)	F	1962 Dyna-Soar Group 2, 1965 USAF MOL Group 1
Robert Crippen	(United States)	F	STS-1, STS-7, STS-41-C, STS-41-G
A. Scott Crossfield*	(United States)	CM, F	First to fly at twice the speed of sound; X-15 design, development, and flight test
Walter Cunningham	(United States)	M	Apollo 7
William H. Dana	(United States)	F	X-15 Flight 174, X-15 Flight 197, lifting body testing
Robert M. DeHaven	(United States)	CM, F	Fighter ace of World War II, Hughes Aircraft Company test pilot
Eugene P. Deatrick	(United States)	M	Nuclear weapons testing, USAF Test Pilot School commandant
Alvin Drew	(United States)	M	STS-118, STS-133
Charles Duke	(United States)	M	Apollo 16
James Dutton	(United States)	M	STS-131
Joe F. Edwards	(United States)	M	STS-89
Donn F. Eisele	(United States)	M	Apollo 7
Donald D. Engen*	(United States)	F	Former FAA Administrator and former Director of the National Air and Space Museum
Joe Engle	(United States)	F	X-15 Flight 138, X-15 Flight 143, X-15 Flight 153, ALT, STS-2, STS-51-I
Frank K. Everest	(United States)	F	X-plane testing, X-1 and X-2 speed and altitude records, "fastest man alive" in 1956
Lou Everett*	(United States)	CM, M	Ryan V/STOL aircraft flight test including the XV-5 Vertifan
John L. Finley	(United States)	AM	1965 USAF MOL Group 1
Jack D. Fischer	(United States)	M	Soyuz MS-04 (Expedition 51/52)
Patrick G. Forrester	(United States)	M	STS-105, STS-117, STS-128
Steve Fossett*	(United States)	M	First solo nonstop around the world in a balloon and in a fixed-wing aircraft
Theodore Freeman*	(United States)	AM	1963 NASA Group 3
Stephen Frick	(United States)	M	STS-110, STS-122
C. Gordon Fullerton	(United States)	F	ALT, STS-3, STS-51-F
Fitzhugh L. Fulton	(United States)	F	Piloted B-52 launch aircraft for multiple X-planes, XB-70 testing, Boeing 747 SCA testing
Ronald J. Garan	(United States)	M	STS-124, Soyuz TMA-21 (Expedition 27/28)
Jerauld R. Gentry	(United States)	F	Lifting body testing including first flight of the X-24A
John Glenn	(United States)	F	Mercury-Atlas 6, STS-95
Richard F. Gordon	(United States)	AF	Gemini 11, Apollo 12
Frederick D. Gregory	(United States)	M	STS-51-B, STS-33, STS-44, Deputy Administrator of NASA
S. David Griggs*	(United States)	M	STS-51-D
Gus Grissom*	(United States)	M	Mercury-Redstone 4, Gemini 3, Apollo 1
Sidney M. Gutierrez	(United States)	M	STS-40, STS-59
Chris Hadfield	(Canada)	M	STS-74, STS-100, Soyuz TMA-07M (Expedition 34/35)
Fred Haise	(United States)	F	Apollo 13, ALT
Kenneth Ham	(United States)	M	STS-124, STS-132
Henry Hartsfield	(United States)	F	STS-4, STS-41-D, STS-61-A
Frederick Hauck	(United States)	F	STS-7, STS-51-A, STS-26
Thomas B. Hayward	(United States)	AM	Chief of Naval Operations, 1978–1982
J. Lynn Helms	(United States)	M	Test pilot, former Piper CEO, and former FAA Administrator
Bob Hoover	(United States)	P, F	Transcontinental, time-to-climb, and speed records; air show pilot
Rick Husband*	(United States)	M	STS-96, STS-107
James Irwin	(United States)	M	Apollo 15
Dick Johnson	(United States)	CM, AF	F-86 speed record, first flights of F-111, F-102, and F-106
Gregory C. Johnson	(United States)	M	STS-125
Scott Kelly	(United States)	AF	STS-103, STS-118, Soyuz TMA-16M/Soyuz TMA-18M (Exp 43/44/45/46, ISS year-long mission)
Iven C. Kincheloe*	(United States)	M	Double ace of the Korean War, first flight above 100,000 feet in Bell X‑2
William J. Knight	(United States)	P, F	Speed record on X-15 Flight 188, astronaut wings on X-15 Flight 190
Timothy Kopra	(United States)	M	STS-127/128 (Expedition 20), Soyuz TMA-19M (Expedition 46/47)
Kelly Latimer	(United States)	F	Test pilot on White Knight Two and Cosmic Girl
Richard E. Lawyer	(United States)	F	1965 USAF MOL Group
Tony LeVier	(United States)	CM, F	Air racer and Lockheed test pilot with many first flights including XF-90, XF-104, and U-2
Steven Lindsey	(United States)	M	STS-87, STS-95, STS-104, STS-121, STS-133
Paul Lockhart	(United States)	M	STS-111, STS-113
Christopher Loria	(United States)	M	High angle of attack flight test, 1996 NASA Group
Jim Lovell	(United States)	F	Gemini 7, Gemini 12, Apollo 8, Apollo 13
Donald L. Mallick	(United States)	F	LLRV and XB-70 testing
John A. Manke	(United States)	M	First supersonic flight of a lifting body; first controlled landing of a lifting body; director of NASA Dryden Flight Research Center
Nicole A. Mann	(United States)	M	SpaceX Crew-5 (Expedition 67/68)
Paul Mantz*	(United States)	M	Air racer and movie precision pilot
George J. Marrett	(United States)	F	Hughes Aircraft Company test pilot, aviation author
Ken Mattingly	(United States)	M	Apollo 16, STS-4, STS-51-C
Jon McBride	(United States)	M	STS-41-G, STS-61-E (never flew)
Michael J. McCulley	(United States)	M	STS-34
James McDivitt	(United States)	M	Gemini 4, Apollo 9
John B. McKay	(United States)	CM, M	High-speed flight research programs, astronaut wings for X-15 Flight 150
Donald R. McMonagle	(United States)	M	STS-39, STS-54, STS-66
Thomas McMurtry	(United States)	P, F	First flight of the NASA AD-1
Carl J. Meade	(United States)	M	STS-38, STS-50, STS-64
Pamela Melroy	(United States)	F	STS-92, STS-112, STS-120, NASA deputy administrator
Mike Melvill	(South Africa) (United States)	F	First commercial astronaut as pilot of SpaceShipOne flight 15P
Edgar Mitchell	(United States)	M	Apollo 14
Arthur W. Murray	(United States)	F	Bell X-1 and Bell X-5 testing
Art Nalls	(United States)	M	Air show pilot flying privately owned Harrier jump jet
Howard W. "Sam" Nelson*	(United States)	AF	
Lew A. Nelson	(United States)	CM, F	T-38 and YA-9 first flights
Julian Nott*	(United Kingdom)	AF	Record-setting achievements in ballooning
Stephen S. Oswald	(United States)	M	STS-42, STS-56, STS-67
Robert F. Overmyer*	(United States)	M	STS-5, STS-51-B
Donald H.Papish*	(United States)	M	
Allen Paulson	(United States)	M	CEO of Gulfstream Aerospace
Doug Pearson	(United States)	F	First pilot to shoot down a satellite from an aircraft
Forrest S. Petersen	(United States)	M	X-15 flight testing
Bruce Peterson	(United States)	F	Lifting body flight testing
Frank Piasecki	(United States)	M	Helicopter aviation pioneer
Alan G. Poindexter	(United States)	M	STS-122, STS-131
Mark L. Polansky	(United States)	M	STS-98, STS-116, STS-127
Charles J. Precourt	(United States)	AF	STS-55, STS-71, STS-84, STS-91
Steven M. Rainey	(United States)	P, F	First USAF pilot to fly the F-22
William F. Readdy	(United States)	F	STS-42, STS-51, STS-79
Kenneth S. Reightler Jr	(United States)	M	STS-48, STS-60
Richard N. Richards	(United States)	M	STS-28, STS-41, STS-50, STS-64
Russell L. Rogers*	(United States)	M	1960 Dyna-Soar Group 1
Kent Rominger	(United States)	M	STS-73, STS-80, STS-85, STS-96, STS-100
Stuart Roosa	(United States)	M	Apollo 14
Yves Rossy	(Switzerland)	M	First to fly a jet engine-powered wing
Robert A. Rushworth	(United States)	F	Astronaut wings on X-15 Flight 87
Burt Rutan	(United States)	F	Designer of record-breaking aircraft and spacecraft
Dick Rutan	(United States)	F	First non-stop, non-refueled around-the-world flight
Herman Salmon*	(United States)	CM, F	First flights of L-188 Electra, P-3 Orion, and YF-104A Starfighter
Louis Schalk	(United States)	F	First flight of the Lockheed A-12
Wally Schirra	(United States)	F	Mercury-Atlas 8, Gemini 6A, Apollo 7
Dick Scobee*	(United States)	M	STS-41-C, STS-51-L (disaster)
David Scott	(United States)	M	Gemini 8, Apollo 9, Apollo 15
Richard A. Searfoss	(United States)	AF	STS-58, STS-76, STS-90
Elliot See*	(United States)	M	1962 NASA Group 2
Doug Shane	(United States)	P, F	Former president of Scaled Composites and The Spaceship Company
Alan Shepard	(United States)	F	Mercury-Redstone 3, Apollo 14
Peter Siebold	(United States)	AF	Scaled Composites test pilot for SpaceShipOne and SpaceShipTwo
Deke Slayton	(United States)	F	Apollo–Soyuz Test Project
Sherwood C. Spring	(United States)	M	STS-61-B
Robert C. Springer	(United States)	M	STS-29, STS-38
Thomas P. Stafford	(United States)	F	Gemini 6A, Gemini 9A, Apollo 10, Apollo–Soyuz Test Project
Moye W. Stephens	(United States)	F	Circumnavigation of the globe in 1931
Robert L. Stephens	(United States)	P, F	Speed and altitude records testing the YF-12
Robert L. Stewart	(United States)	M	STS-41-B, STS-51-J
Mark P. Stucky	(United States)	P, F	Piloted VSS Unity VP-03 above 50 miles
Jack Swigert	(United States)	AF	Apollo 13
James M. Taylor*	(United States)	AM	1965 USAF MOL Group 1
W. Paul Thayer	(United States)	F	Fighter ace of World War II, former US Deputy Secretary of Defense
Richard G. Thomas	(United States)	F	First flights of the Tacit Blue and F-5F
Milton O. Thompson	(United States)	M	First person to fly a lifting body, X-15 flight test
Scott D. Tingle	(United States)	M	Soyuz MS-07 (Expedition 54/55)
Robert F. Titus	(United States)	F	Century Series flight testing including zero-length-launch tests
Art Tomassetti	(United States)	P, F	X-35 and F-35 flight test
Guy M. Townsend	(United States)	F	Co-pilot on the first flight of the B-52
Brian Trubshaw	(United Kingdom)	F	First British pilot to fly Concorde
Richard H. Truly	(United States)	F	First former astronaut to be NASA administrator
Joseph J. Tymczyszyn	(United States)	CM, P, F	Boeing 707 and Douglas DC-8 flight testing
David M. Walker	(United States)	AF	STS-51-A, STS-30, STS-53, STS-69
Joseph A. Walker*	(United States)	CM, F	Highest flights of the X-15 program—X-15 Flight 90, X-15 Flight 91
Jim Wetherbee	(United States)	M	STS-32, STS-52, STS-63, STS-86, STS-102, STS-113
Douglas H. Wheelock	(United States)	M	STS-120, Soyuz TMA-19 (Expedition 24/25)
Alvin S. White	(United States)	P, F	First flights of both XB-70s
Ed White*	(United States)	M	Gemini 4, Apollo 1
Robert M. White	(United States)	M	First "winged astronaut" on X-15 Flight 62
Terrence W. Wilcutt	(United States)	M	STS-68, STS-79, STS-89, STS-106
Clifton Williams*	(United States)	AM	1963 NASA Group 3
Donald E. Williams	(United States)	M	STS-51-D, STS-34
Jeffrey Williams	(United States)	M	STS-101, Soyuz TMA-8 (Exp 13), Soyuz TMA-16 (Exp 21/22), Soyuz TMA-20M (Exp 47/48)
Sunita Williams	(United States)	M	STS-116/117 (Exp 14/15), Soyuz TMA-05M (Exp 32/33), Boeing Crewed Flight Test
James W. Wood	(United States)	P, F	1960 Dyna-Soar Group 1
Chuck Yeager	(United States)	F	First pilot to exceed the speed of sound in level flight
John Young	(United States)	F	Gemini 3, Gemini 10, Apollo 10, Apollo 16, STS-1, STS-9

=== Honorary fellows ===
The following table contains honorary fellows of the society both living and dead. A complete list of Honorary Fellows is published by the society.

* Individual was killed in an aviation-related accident.

Name	Country	Status	Notability
Bryan Allen	(United States)	HF	Pioneer in human powered flight
Fred Ascani	(United States)	HF	Father of systems engineering at Wright Field, F-86 speed record
Jacqueline Auriol	(France)	HF	Pioneering woman aviator who set several world speed records
Roland Beamont	(United Kingdom)	HF	First British pilot to exceed Mach 1 in a British aircraft in level flight
Edward A. Bellande	(United States)	HF	Early aviator who received the Airmail Flyers' Medal of Honor in 1935
Albert Boyd	(United States)	HF	Father of modern flight testing, P-80 airspeed record
Mark E. Bradley	(United States)	HF	Pioneering test pilot and commander of USAF Logistics Command
Vance Breese	(United States)	HF	First flights of the N-1M and XP-61
Colin E. Brown	(United Kingdom)	HF	Fourteen victory ace in World War I
Eric M. Brown	(United Kingdom)	HF	Flew more types of aircraft (487) than anyone else in history
Jean-Loup Chrétien	(France)	HF	Soyuz T-6, Soyuz TM-7 / Mir Aragatz / Soyuz TM-6, STS-86
Jacqueline Cochran	(United States)	HF	Pioneering woman racing pilot, multiple speed and altitude records
Thomas F. Connolly	(United States)	HF	Development of the F-14 Tomcat, USN Test Pilot School director
Lawrence C. Craigie	(United States)	HF	First US military jet pilot, director of R&D at HQ USAF
Irv Culver	(United States)	HF	Helped design the USA's first operational jet fighter, named LM's Skunk Works
John Cunningham	(United Kingdom)	HF	Night fighter ace during World War II
William V. Davis	(United States)	HF	The Three Seahawks USN aerobatic team, USN Test Pilot School director
Jimmy Dell	(United Kingdom)	HF	BAC TSR-2 testing
Jimmy Doolittle	(United States)	HF	Record-breaking speed flights, air racer, development and flight-test of instrument flying
Neville Duke	(United Kingdom)	HF	Fighter ace of World War II, 1953 air speed record, Hawker Hunter development
Ira C. Eaker	(United States)	HF	1926 Pan American Goodwill Flight, 1929 world flight endurance record
Edward L. Feightner	(United States)	HF	Fighter ace of World War II, Vought F7U Cutlass flight test, Blue Angels solo
Benjamin Foulois	(United States)	HF	First US military aviator, first US radio/air reconnaissance
Eduardo Gallarza	(Spain)	HF	First flight from Madrid to Manila in 1926
Chalmers Goodlin	(United States)	HF	Bell X-1 flight testing
Robert L. Hall	(United States)	HF	Design and test of F4F Wildcat and F6F Hellcat
Harold R. Harris	(United States)	HF	First flight of the Barling Bomber, first American military pilot saved by a parachute
Alex Henshaw	(United Kingdom)	HF	Distance records, chief test pilot for Vickers Armstrongs
Stanley Hiller	(United States)	HF	Pioneering developer of the helicopter
Walter Horton	(Germany)	HF	Co-designer of the world's first jet-powered flying wing, the Horten Ho 229
Ben O. Howard	(United States)	HF	Air racer and flight test of multiple Douglas aircraft
Howard Hughes	(United States)	HF	Record-setting air racer, founder of Hughes Aircraft Company
Jared Isaacman	(United States)	HF	Pilot, commercial astronaut, and administrator of NASA
Benjamin S. Kelsey	(United States)	HF	Fighter development during World War II
Charles Lindbergh	(United States)	HF	First solo transatlantic flight
Grover Loening	(Germany) (United States)	HF	Formed the Loening Aeronautical Engineering Corporation in 1917
Donald S. Lopez Sr.	(United States)	HF	Ace of World War II, early jet fighter testing, deputy director of National Air and Space Museum
Neal V. Loving	(United States)	HF	First double amputee to be licensed as a racing pilot
John A. Macready	(United States)	HF	Record setting flights for altitude, distance, and endurance
Jimmie Mattern	(United States)	HF	Aviation world record attempts, P-38 flight test
William H. McAvoy	(United States)	HF	First flight of the Grumman XFF-1
Johnny Miller	(United States)	HF	Autogyro pioneer
Georgy Mosolov	(Russia)	HF	First flight in the prototype MiG-21
Harald Penrose	(United Kingdom)	HF	Former chief test pilot at Westland Aircraft and aviation author
Robert B. Pirie	(United States)	HF	Former Deputy Chief of Naval Operations for air
Paul Poberezny	(United States)	HF	Founded the Experimental Aircraft Association (EAA)
Jeffrey Quill	(United Kingdom)	HF	Former chief test pilot for Vickers, aviation author
Günther Rall	(Germany)	HF	Third most successful fighter pilot in aviation history with 275 victories
Hanna Reitsch	(Germany)	HF	Flight tested many of Germany's new aircraft during World War II
T. Claude Ryan	(United States)	HF	Founder of Ryan Aeronautical
Jean-Marie Saget	(France)	HF	Former chief test pilot for Dassault Aviation
Alexander P. de Seversky	(Russia) (United States)	HF	Founder of the Seversky Aero Corporation
Igor Sikorsky	(Russia) (United States)	HF	Aviation pioneer in both helicopters and fixed-wing aircraft
Ozires Silva	(Brazil)	HF	Founder of Embraer
Thomas Sopwith	(United Kingdom)	HF	Aviation pioneer and founder of Sopwith Aviation Company
Percival H. Spencer	(United States)	HF	Early aviator and inventor who made his first solo flight in 1914
Robert Stanley*	(United States)	HF	First American to fly a jet aircraft as a test pilot for Bell Aircraft
James Stockdale	(United States)	HF	USN test pilot awarded the Medal of Honor in the Vietnam War
Russell Thaw	(United States)	HF	First flight of the XF3D-1
Frederick M. Trapnell	(United States)	HF	First US Navy pilot to fly a jet aircraft, co-founder of USN Test Pilot School
Roscoe Turner	(United States)	HF	Three-time winner of the Thompson Trophy air race
Peter Twiss	(United Kingdom)	HF	First to fly a jet aircraft faster than 1,000 mph
Alfred V. Verville	(United States)	HF	Aviation pioneer responsible for retractable landing gear
Ken Wallis	(United Kingdom)	HF	Development of autogyros
Ernest K. Warburton	(United States)	HF	Chief of the Air Materiel Command's Flight Test Division at Wright Field
Waldo Waterman	(United States)	HF	Developed a tailless flying car known as the Waterman Arrowbile
Frank Whittle	(United Kingdom)	HF	Inventor of the turbojet engine
Steve Wittman*	(United States)	HF	Pioneering air-racer and aircraft engineer
Henri Ziegler	(France)	HF	Founder and first president of Airbus
Janusz Żurakowski	(Poland)	HF	Flight test of Canadian supersonic aircraft

=== Former members ===
The following table contains former members of the society both living and dead. Members may resign from the society by submitting a written notice. The society does not publish the names of former members so inclusion in this table must be determined by reliable sources other than the society itself (e.g. a public statement from the former member, biographies from a reliable source showing membership was dropped, etc.).

Name	Country	Status	Notability
Scott Carpenter	(United States)	M	Mercury-Atlas 7
Brent W. Jett	(United States)	M	STS-72, STS-81, STS-97, STS-115
Rusty Schweickart	(United States)	M	Apollo 9

=== Friends ===
The following table contains individuals who were not eligible for membership but assisted the society in its endeavors and were recognized as a friend of the society. A complete list of friends is published by the society.

Name	Country	Status	Notability
Richard P. Hallion	(United States)	FR	Author and former USAF historian
David Hartman	(United States)	FR	First host of ABC's Good Morning America, SETP symposia moderator
Barron Hilton	(United States)	FR	Chairman of Hilton Hotels Corporation
