= International Order of Characters =

- Logo, International Order of Characters

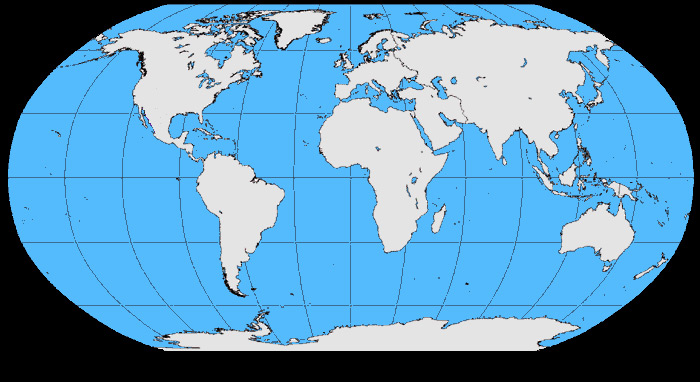
- An internationally recognized organization
- Abbreviation: IOC
- Formation: 1942
- Purpose: Aviation-Oriented Educational Foundation
- Location: Darien, Connecticut
- Region served: Worldwide
- Chairman: Alton G. Hudson
- Website: IOC

The International Order of Characters (IOC) is an organization dedicated to improving the fields of aviation and aerospace. The IOC also provides financial assistance to persons and organizations in fields related to aviation and other technology industries.

== History ==
In the South Pacific theater, in the early days of World War II, a United States Army Air Forces flight surgeon, Captain James E. Crane, organized a group of American and Allied pilots under his care into a fraternal order that came to be called the International Order of Characters. At their induction into the order, each member received a private nickname known only to the other members. The private nicknames soon became public call-signs for the aviators as they recovered and returned to the war. By 1943, the IOC had grown to nearly one thousand members, but activity in the order stopped when Crane was reassigned to the United States.

In the early 1950s, Dr. Crane, then a flight examiner for the Federal Aviation Administration, reactivated the IOC at the urging of former members. The reborn IOC became an education foundation that provided scholarships and grants to children of deceased or disabled pilots as well as to former members of the armed forces who studied for a degree in aviation-related fields of research.

== Publications ==
The order publishes the IOC Memorial Log commemorating those friends, family, or IOC members that have died. The Memorial Log is presented at every meeting of the IOC.

== Conferences ==
The IOC typically hosts two meeting a year—an aviation symposium in the spring and a meeting in the fall. These events have been held at locations throughout the world.

== Awards ==
During its annual meetings, the IOC recognizes aviation personalities and aviation achievement with the following trophies. The IOC trophies are awarded on the basis of achievement in aviation, aerospace and associated fields of activity. Recipients are not required to be IOC members.

=== Aero Space Trophy Award ===
Recipients of the IOC Aero Space Trophy Award include:

- 1964—Joseph Walker
- 1965—James McDivitt
- 1966—Robert Rushworth
- 1967—William "Pete" Knight
- 1969—Igor Sikorsky
- 1970—Jerauld Gentry
- 1971—John Stack
- 1972—Walter Schirra, Jr.
- 1973—William P. Lear
- 1981—Paul Tibbets
- 1982—Jack Hall
- 1983—Bob Stephens
- 1984—Neil Anderson
- 1991—Kenneth L. Tallman
- 1995—Barry Goldwater
- 1996—Charles H. Kaman
- 1997—Jeffery L. Ethell

=== Character of the Year Award ===
Recipients of the IOC Character of the Year Award include:

- 1962—Roscoe Turner
- 1963—Barry Goldwater
- 1964—Adm. Daniel F. Smith
- 1965—Maj. Gen. C.L. Mullins
- 1966—V. Adm. C.E. Rosendahl
- 1967—James E. Crane
- 1969—Herman Salmon
- 1970—R. Adm. George Dufek
- 1971—Takofumi Hishikari
- 1972—Sergei Sikorsky
- 1973—John M. Conroy
- 1974—Joseph U. Greely
- 1975—Joseph Higgins
- 1976—Clifford Henderson
- 1977—Jack Garfield
- 1979—John Boren
- 1980—Douglas Moody
- 1982—Vincent O'Toole
- 1983—Henry J. Esposito
- 1985—John E. Bach
- 1986—Bruce Tingle
- 1987—J. Sheldon Lewis
- 1988—Fred E. Muhl
- 1989—Richard G. Paul
- 1990—Max Feibelman
- 1992—Adriane Gladstone
- 1993—Jerome P. Ashfield
- 1995—Armand S. Toron
- 2000—Alton G. Hudson
- 2002—Donald J. Rauch

=== Pilot of the Year Award ===
Recipients of the IOC Pilot of the Year Award include:

- 1954—Col. Leon W. Gray
- 1955—Capt. Cassmier S. Szmagaj
- 1956—Capt. Edward W. Kinsley
- 1957—Capt. Ned Avary
- 1958—Capt. Page Smith
- 1959—Capt. S.G. Wood
- 1960—Capt. Charles Tennsted
- 1961—General Adolf Galland
- 1961—Robert Stanford Tuck
- 1962—Scott Crossfield
- 1963—Herbet O. Fisher
- 1964—Capt. Marius Lodeesen
- 1965—Gen James Steinoff
- 1966—Brig. Gen. Robin Olds
- 1967—Col. Joseph Cotton
- 1969—A.W. "Tony" LeVier
- 1970—Col. Francis Gabreski
- 1971—Prince Bernard
- 1972—Reitsch-Flagkapitan Hanna Reitsch
- 1973—Col. Joseph Kittinger
- 1974—Adm. F.H. Michaelis
- 1975—H.T. "Dick" Merrill
- 1976—Arthur Godfrey
- 1977—Capt. Charles Mathews
- 1978—Capt. Kimball Scribner
- 1979—Capt. Roy Simpkins
- 1980—David E. Coffman
- 1981—Capt. Joseph Grant
- 1982—Mrs. Siggy Silkorsky
- 1983—Bob Hoover
- 1984—Jack Doswell
- 1985—Con Rodewald
- 1986—Capt. John Testrake
- 1987—Jeana Yeager and Dick Rutan
- 1988—H. Clay Lacy
- 1989—Michael Graham
- 1990—Maj. Gen. Leigh Wade
- 1991—George Haddaway
- 1992—Albert Bayer
- 1993—Ann Lindbergh
- 1994—Capt. Eric Brown
- 1997—Rudy Opitz
- 1998—J. Stephen Fossett
- 1999—Col. Eugene P. Deatrick
- 2000—Johnson M. Taylor
- 2001—Raymond L. Hunicke

== Scholarship fund ==
The IOC Scholarship Fund provides educational assistance to the descendants of pilots and to those pursuing careers in aviation or related industries. The IOC also provides funding to organizations that issue individual scholarships to deserving candidates in fields related to aviation and other technology industries.

== Notable members ==
The following is an incomplete list of notable individuals who are or were members of the IOC. If available, the individual's IOC nickname is also shown.

- Douglas Bader
- Charles Bassett, Boom Boom
- Prince Bernhard of Lippe-Biesterfeld, HRH The Lion
- Eric Brown, Winkle
- Scott Crossfield, Rocket
- Bill Dana, Jose
- Eugene P. Deatrick, Bismark
- Jimmy Doolittle
- George J. Dufek, Penguin
- Louis Ferdinand, Prince of Prussia
- Steve Fossett, Cucumber
- Gabby Gabreski, Gabby
- Adolf Galland, The Red Knight
- Jerauld R. Gentry, Flying Bathtub
- Arthur Godfrey, Bunkie
- Barry Goldwater, Gold Dust
- Richard P. Hallion, Memory Bank
- Bob Hoover, Mustang
- Dietrich Hrabak
- Charles H. Kaman, Pres. Kaman Aircraft
- Joseph Kittinger, The Jump
- William J. Knight, Lickety Split
- Clay Lacy, Racey
- Bill Lear, King Lear
- Tony LeVier, Lightning
- James McDivitt, Gemini Cricket
- Dick Merrill, Old Ping Pong Balls
- Robin Olds, Phantom
- Günther Rall
- Hanna Reitsch, Supersonic Sue
- Robert Rushworth, North Star
- Burt Rutan
- Herman Salmon, Fish
- Walter Schirra, Jr., Sky Ray
- Robert Lee Scott, Jr., Shoe Clerk
- Igor Sikorsky, Winged S
- Johannes Steinhoff
- Robert L. Stephens, The Silver Fox II
- Kenneth L. Tallman, Iron Wind
- Paul Tibbets, Big Bang
- Robert Stanford Tuck, Spitfire
- Roscoe Turner, The Roar
- Joseph Walker, Mach 7
