= Hallion =

Hallion is a surname. Notable people with the surname include:

- Richard P. Hallion, American writer
- Tom Hallion (born 1956), American baseball umpire
