= Commandants of the U.S. Air Force Test Pilot School =

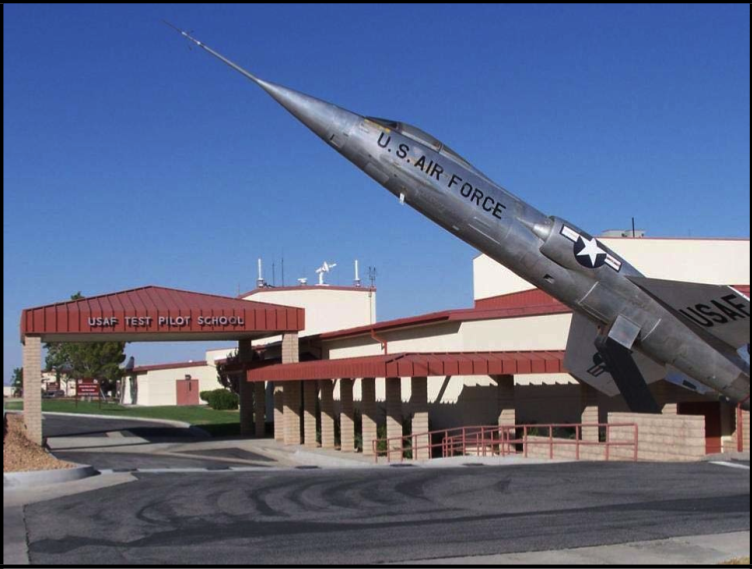
USAF Test Pilot School, Edwards AFB, California

The commanding officer of the U.S. Air Force Test Pilot School (USAF TPS) is known as its Commandant. The commandant leads the school which combines Air Force Materiel Command's (AFMC) most complex flying unit encompassing nearly 4,000 flight hours in over 30 aircraft types annually, and Air University's (AU) most demanding Master of Science degree encompassing over 50 credit hours. The position is usually held by a colonel selected by the AFMC commander although this authority may be delegated to the commander of the Air Force Test Center (AFTC). The commandant oversees all flying training, academic instruction, budgeting, and curriculum administration at the school. The commandant also chairs a board of officers that selects the school's students. The selection board consists of flight test squadron commanders with a majority of the board members being TPS graduates. Every three years, the commandant conducts a review of the school's curriculum with participation from flight test squadrons, the U.S. Naval TPS, and operational squadrons.

The school's mission is to "create test leaders, develop school staff and conduct test research to accelerate multidomain capabilities to the warfighter." Its vision is "testers, leaders, thinkers and innovators in the mold of Jimmy Doolittle." Its ethos is "credible, adaptable, warfighter-focused." The school has three courses: the Flight Test Course (FTC), the Space Test Course (STC), and the Enlisted Test Course (ETC). The FTC develops Experimental Test Pilots, Experimental Flight Test Engineers, Experimental Test Remotely Piloted Aircraft Pilots, and Experimental Test Combat Systems Officers. The STC develops Space Test Engineers and the ETC develops Enlisted Testers across a wide range of Air Force Specialty Codes. In total, the school graduates approximately 90 students each year.

The school was established on September 9, 1944, as the Flight Test Training Unit at Wright-Patterson Air Force Base (AFB) in Dayton, Ohio. To take advantage of the uncongested skies and superb flying weather, the school was moved on February 4, 1951, to its present location at Edwards Air Force Base in the Mojave Desert of Southern California. Edwards AFB is the home of the Air Force Test Center and has been an integral part of flight testing since the 1940s.

Between 1962 and 1972, the Test Pilot School expanded its role to include astronaut training for military test pilots. Thirty-seven TPS graduates of this era were selected for the U.S. space program, and twenty-six went on to earn astronaut's wings by flying in the X-15, Gemini, Apollo, and Space Shuttle programs. Although the school no longer trains astronauts, many TPS graduates since 1972 have been selected by the National Aeronautics and Space Administration (NASA) for duties in space. The school encourages applications from civilians, personnel from other U.S. military services, and individuals from foreign countries. An exchange program allows selected students to attend other test pilot schools including the United States Naval Test Pilot School, the United Kingdom's Empire Test Pilots' School (ETPS), and France's École du personnel navigant d'essais et de réception (EPNER).

== Commandants ==
The following list provides a complete list of commandants of the U.S. Air Force Test Pilot School. The table contains their name, rank, dates as commandant, the TPS class from which they graduated (if applicable), and notable events that occurred during their tenure at the school.

=== Key ===
Rank	Military rank	The rank shown is at the time the individual served as commandant.
Class	Year/Letter	The year and order in which a class started. For example, 07A was the first of two classes to start in 2007.
Class	Roman Numeral	Four Aerospace Research Pilot School (ARPS) classes designated I, II, III, and IV, that prepared students for human spaceflight operations. These classes were dropped when the USAF lost its human spaceflight mission.
Events	"introduced"	Indicates an aircraft type was first made available for use by TPS students. This date is usually much later than the aircraft entered USAF service.

=== List of Commandants ===
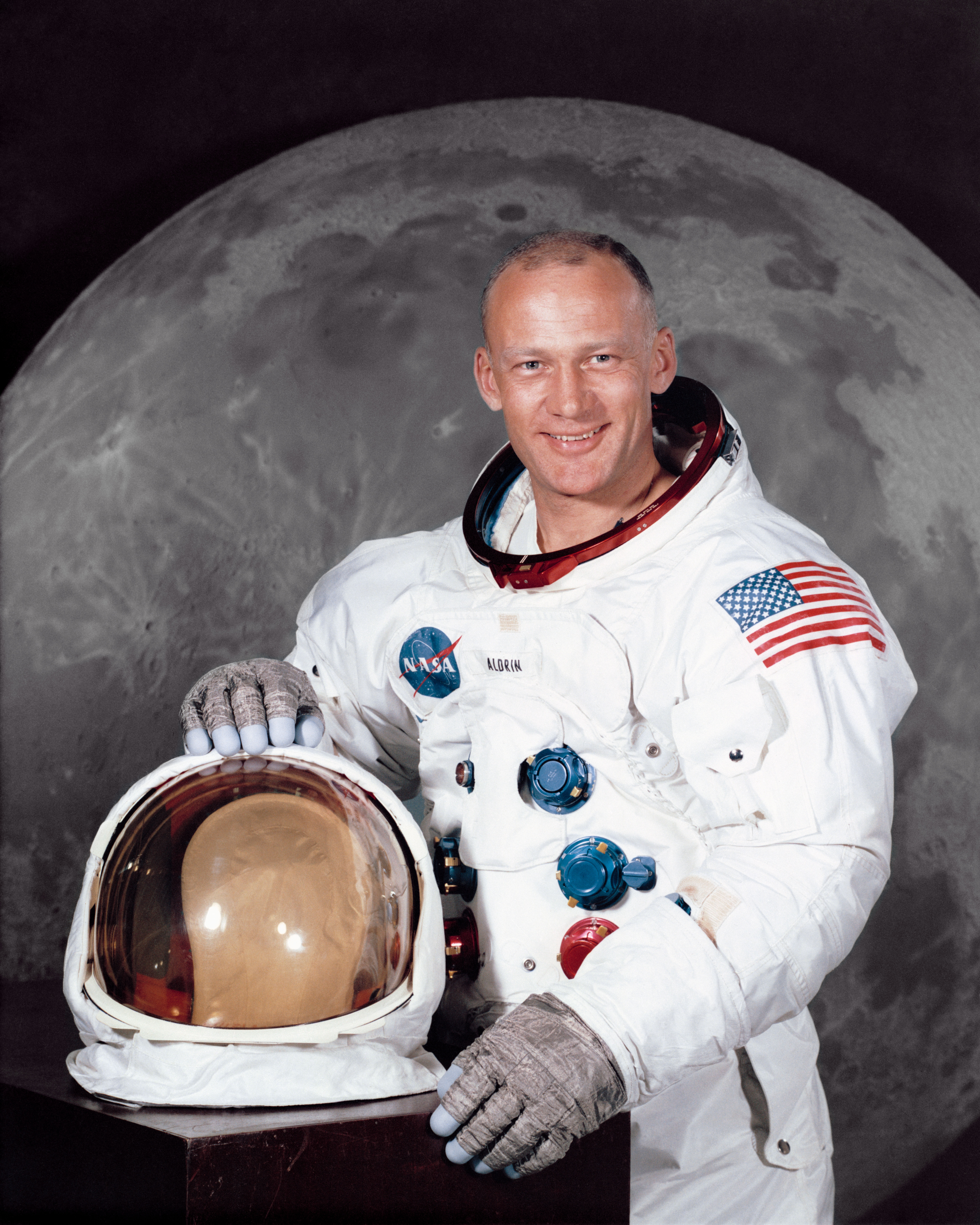
Buzz Aldrin

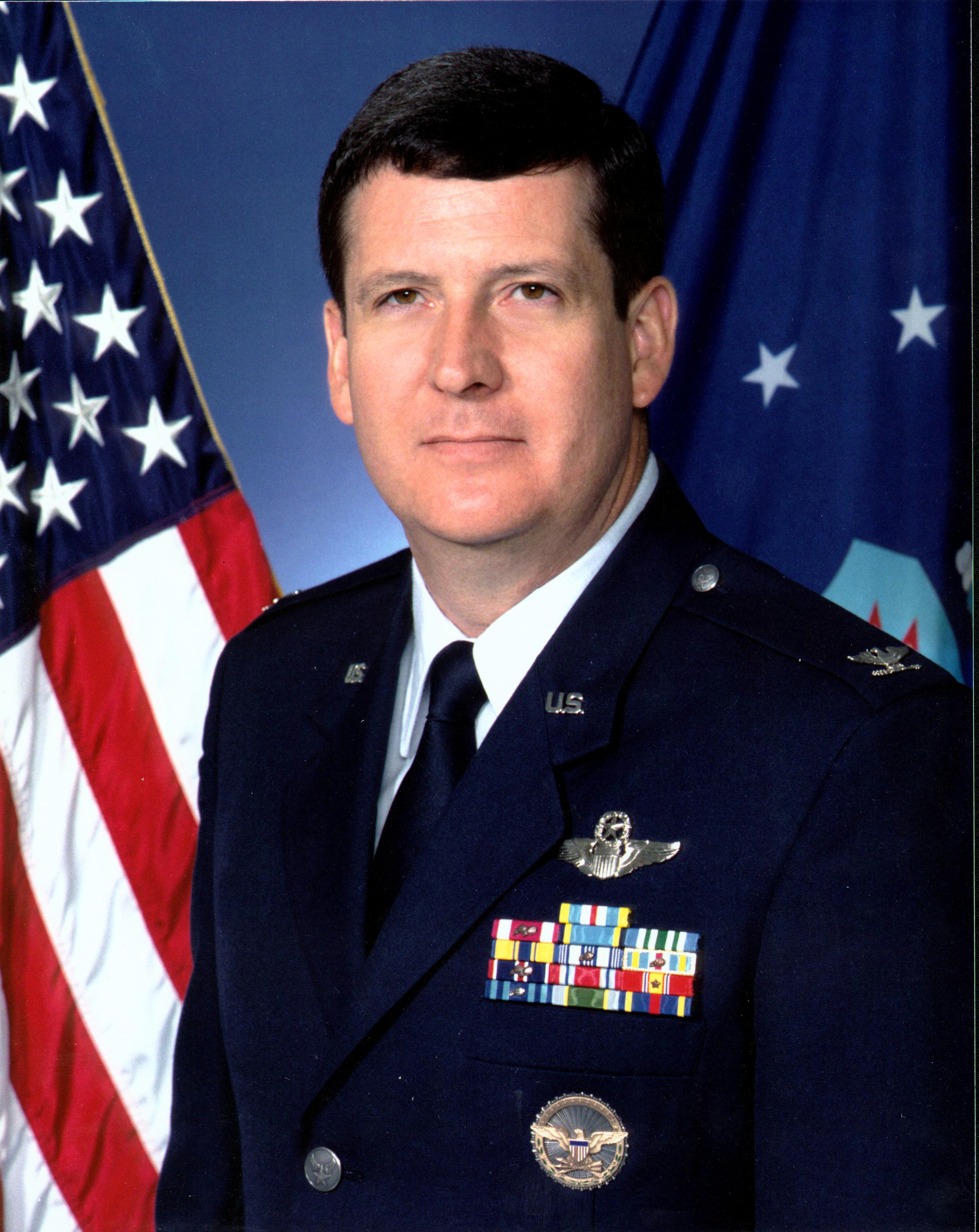
Steve Cameron

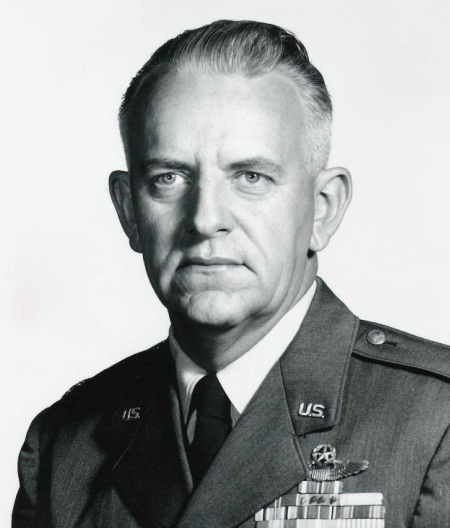
Ken Chilstrom

Gene Deatrick

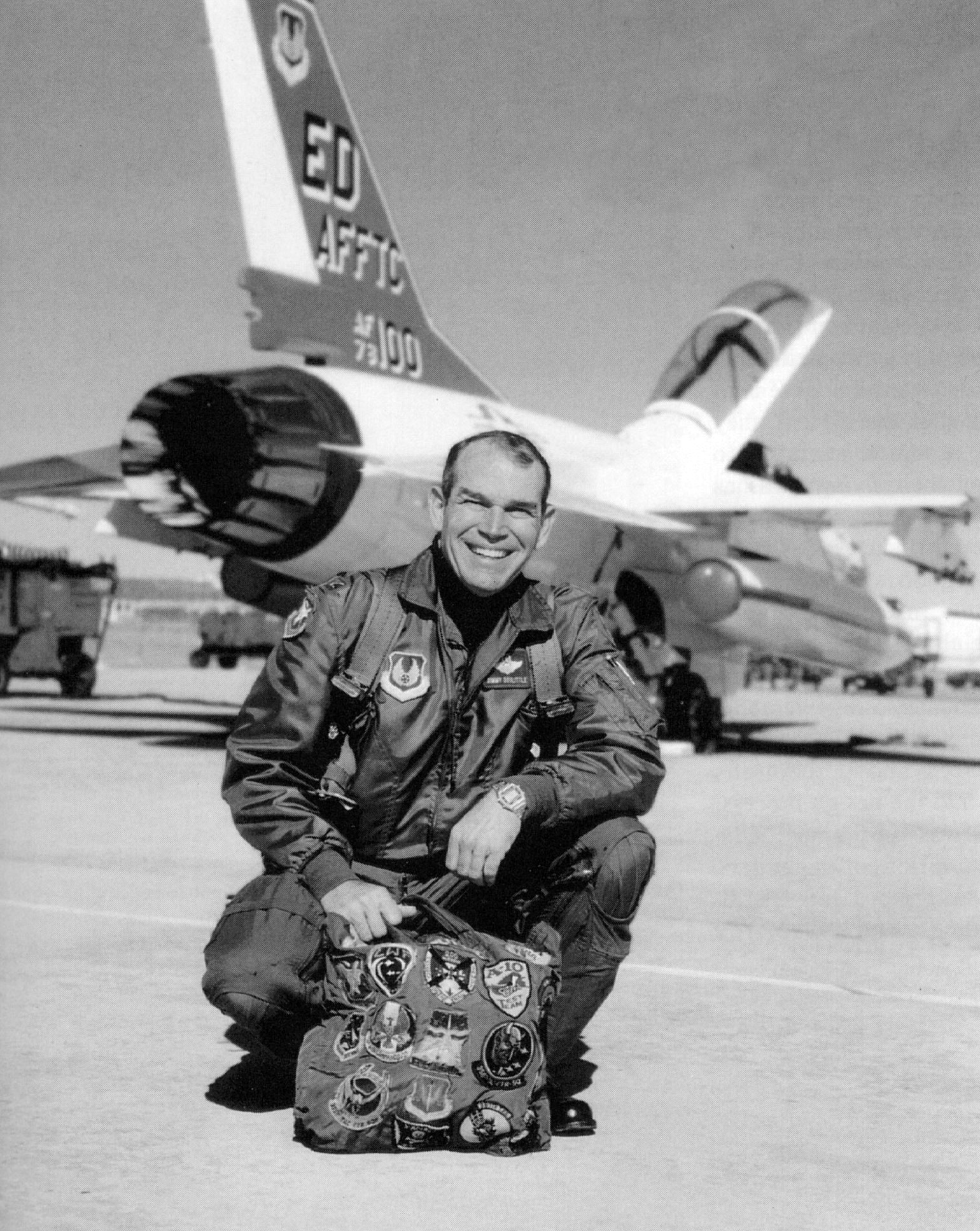
Jim Doolittle, III

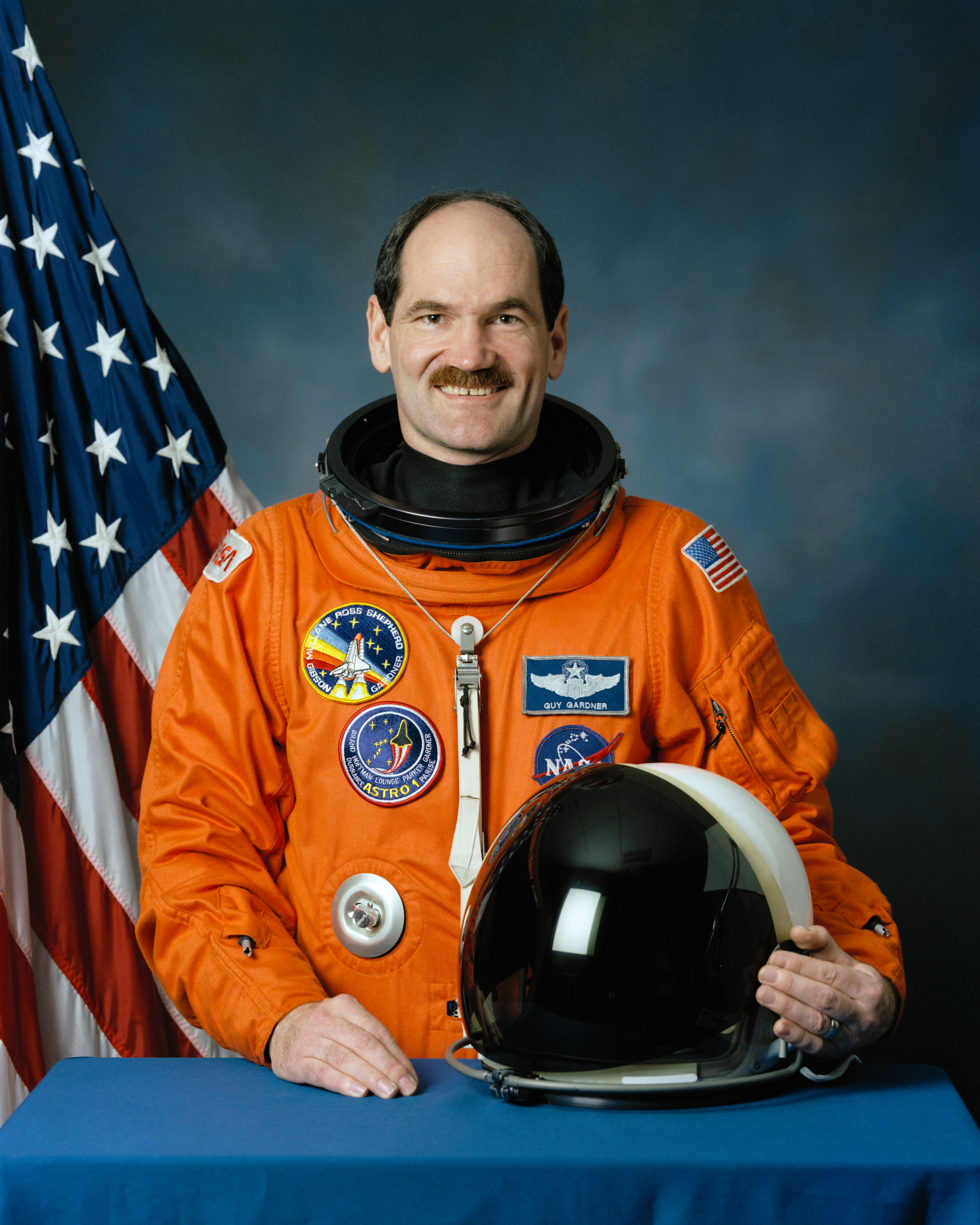
Guy Gardner

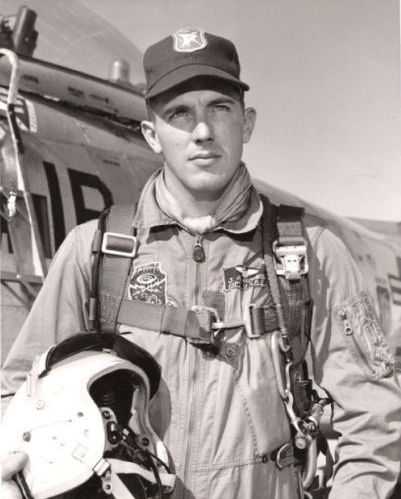
Joe Guthrie

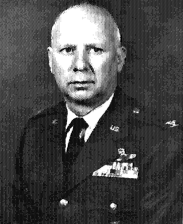
Ralph Hoewing

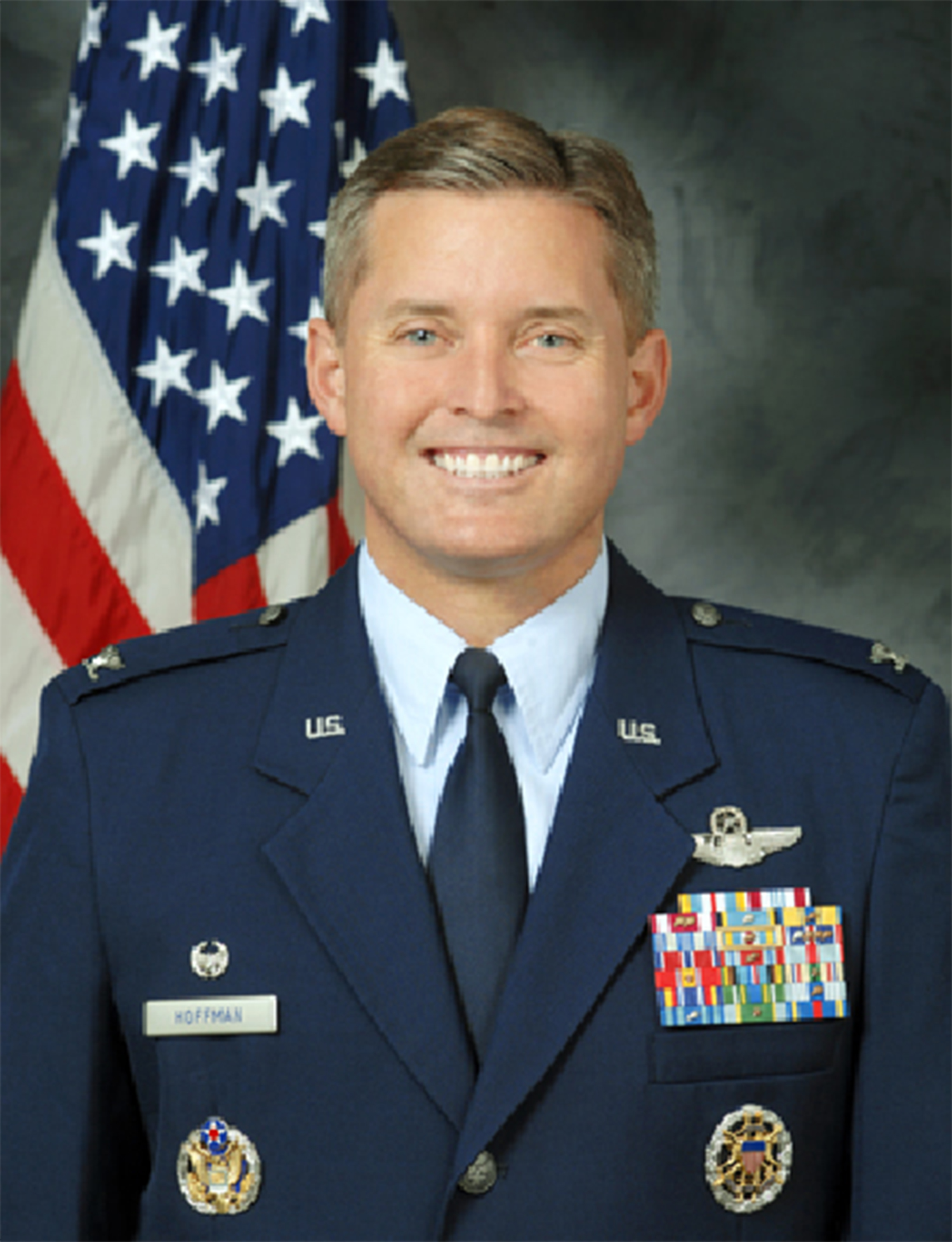
Lars Hoffman

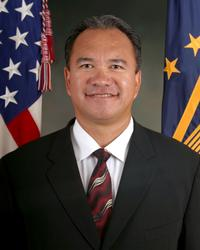
George Ka'iliwai III

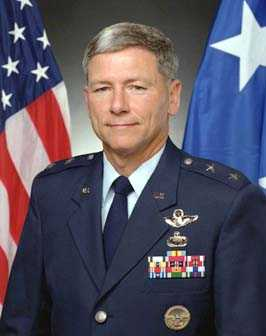
Michael Kostelnik

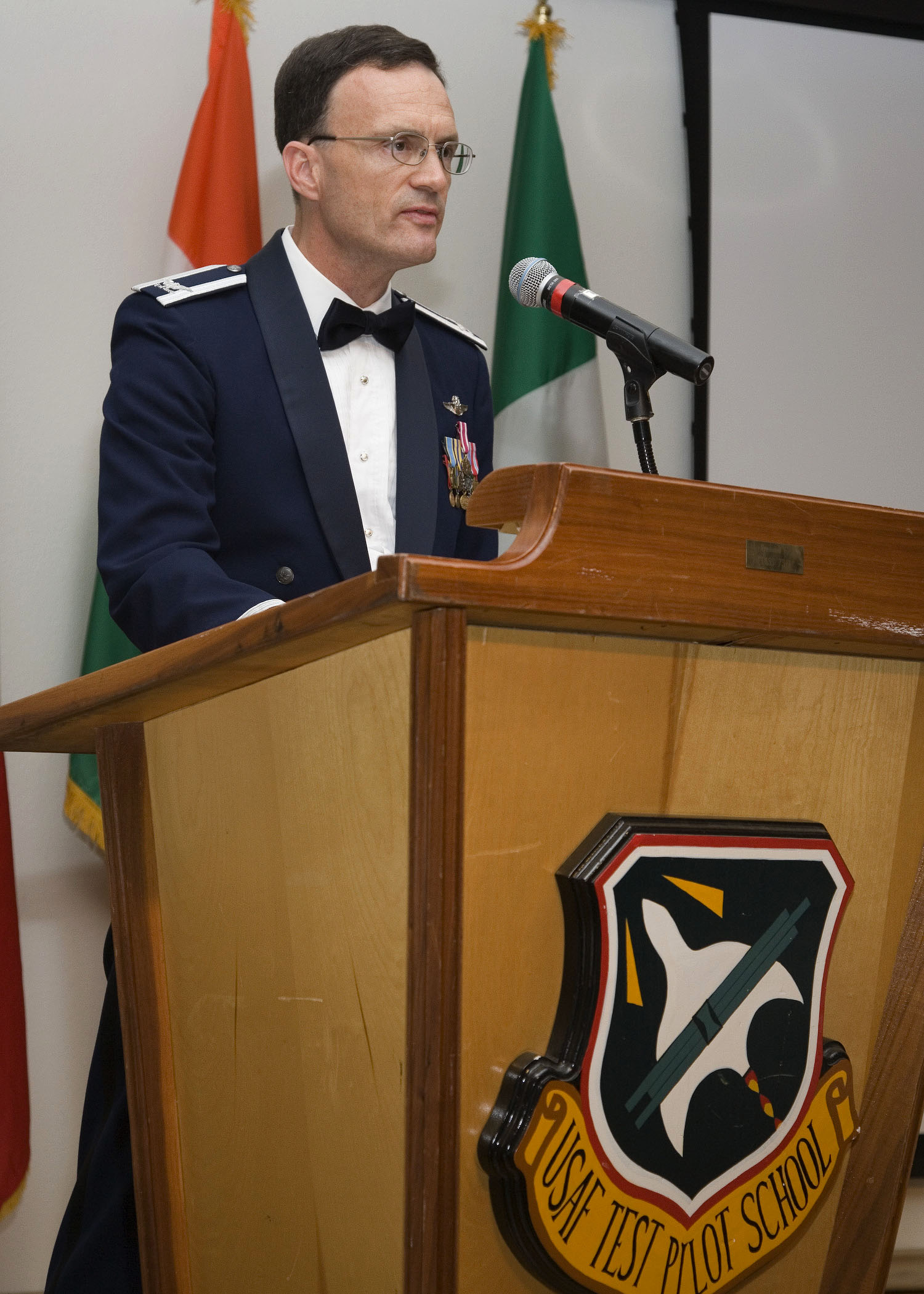
Mike Luallen

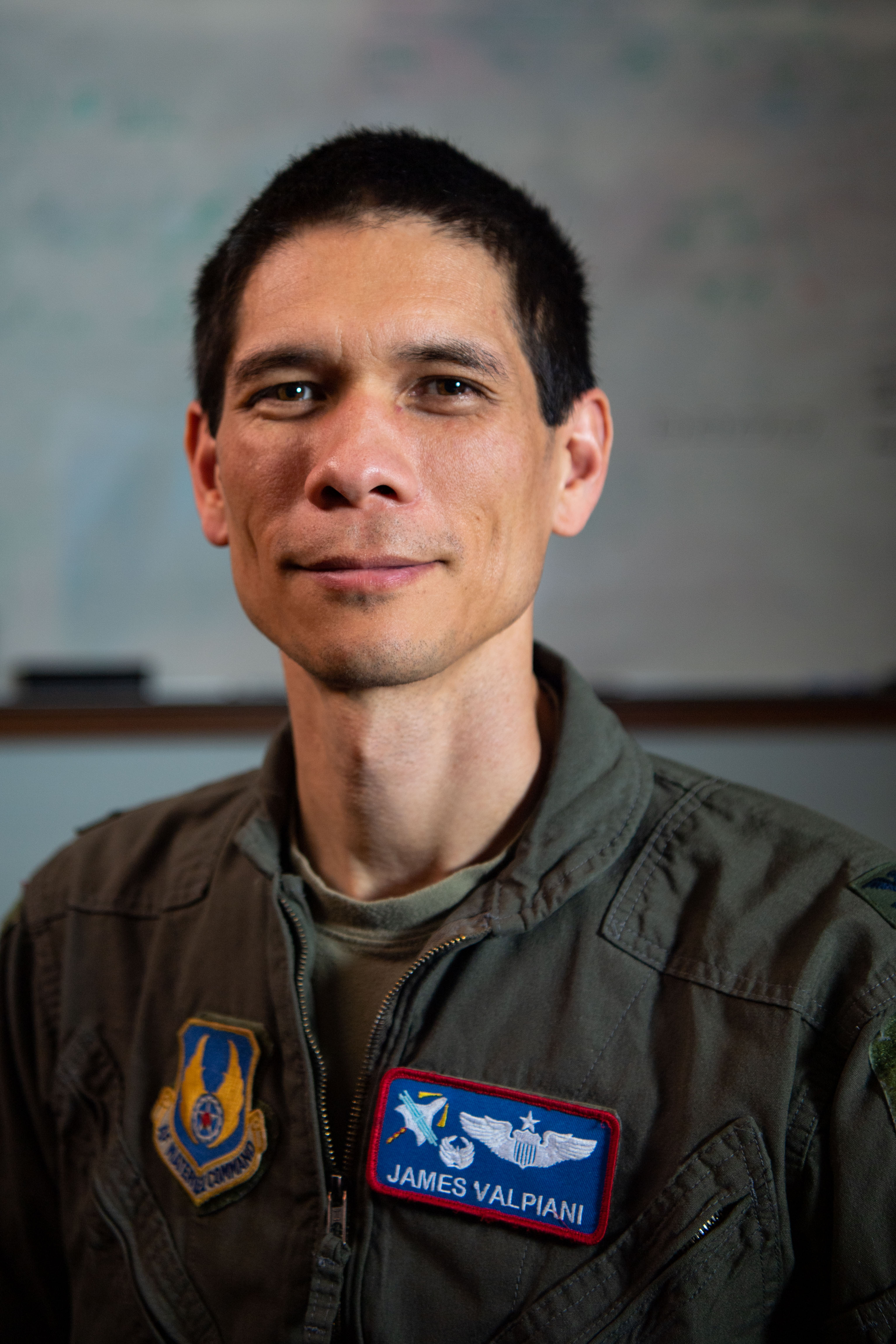
James Valpiani

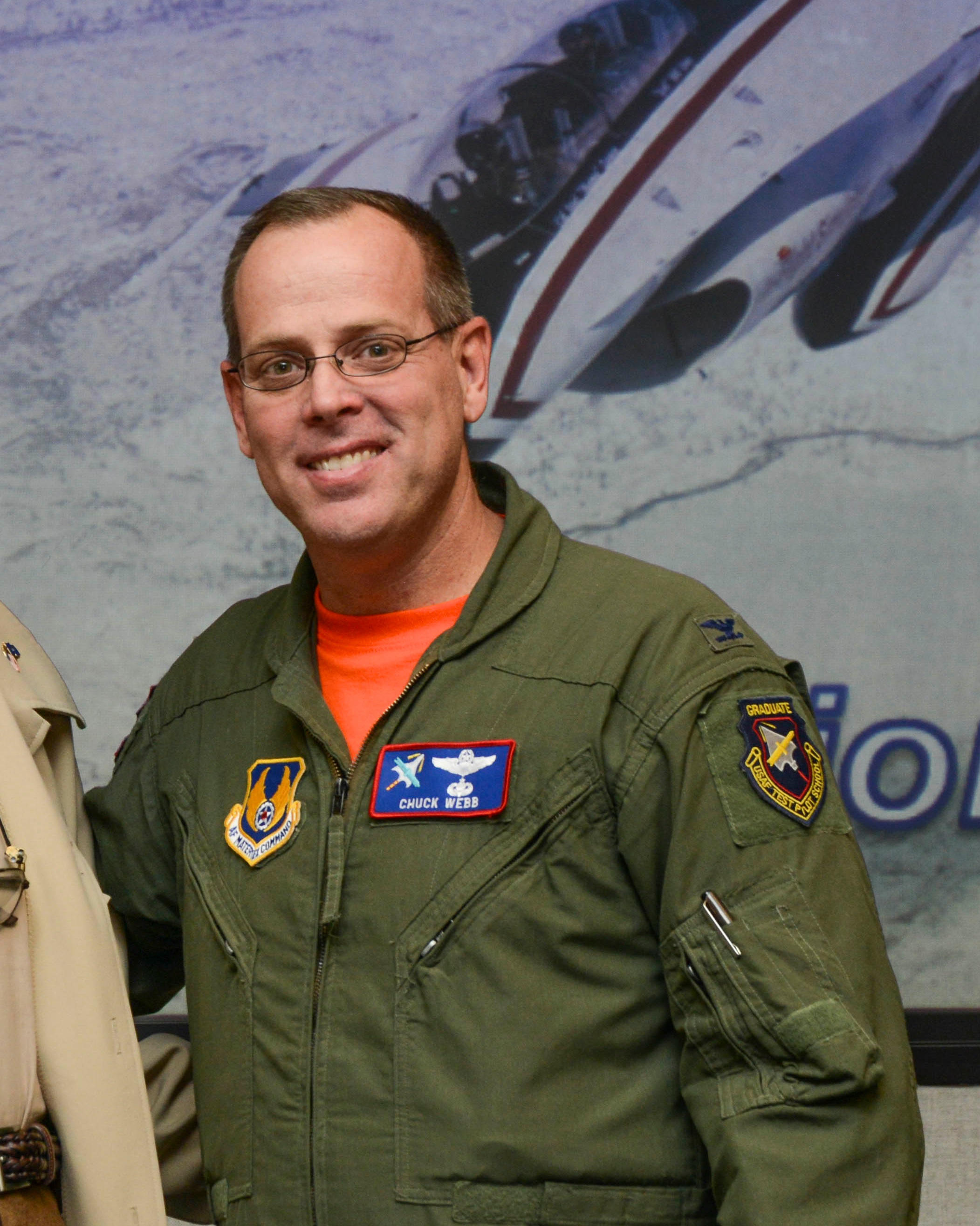
Charles Webb

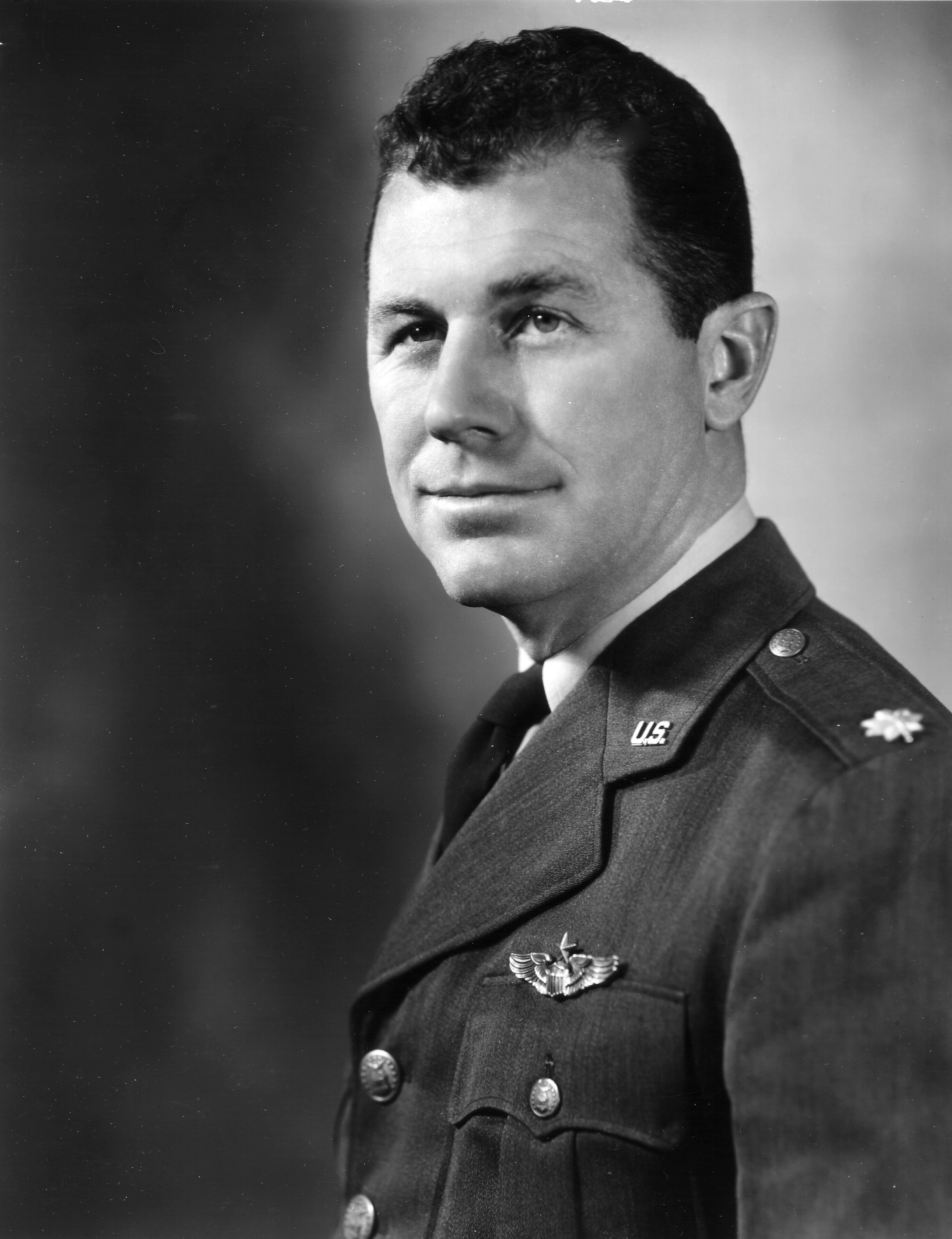
Chuck Yeager

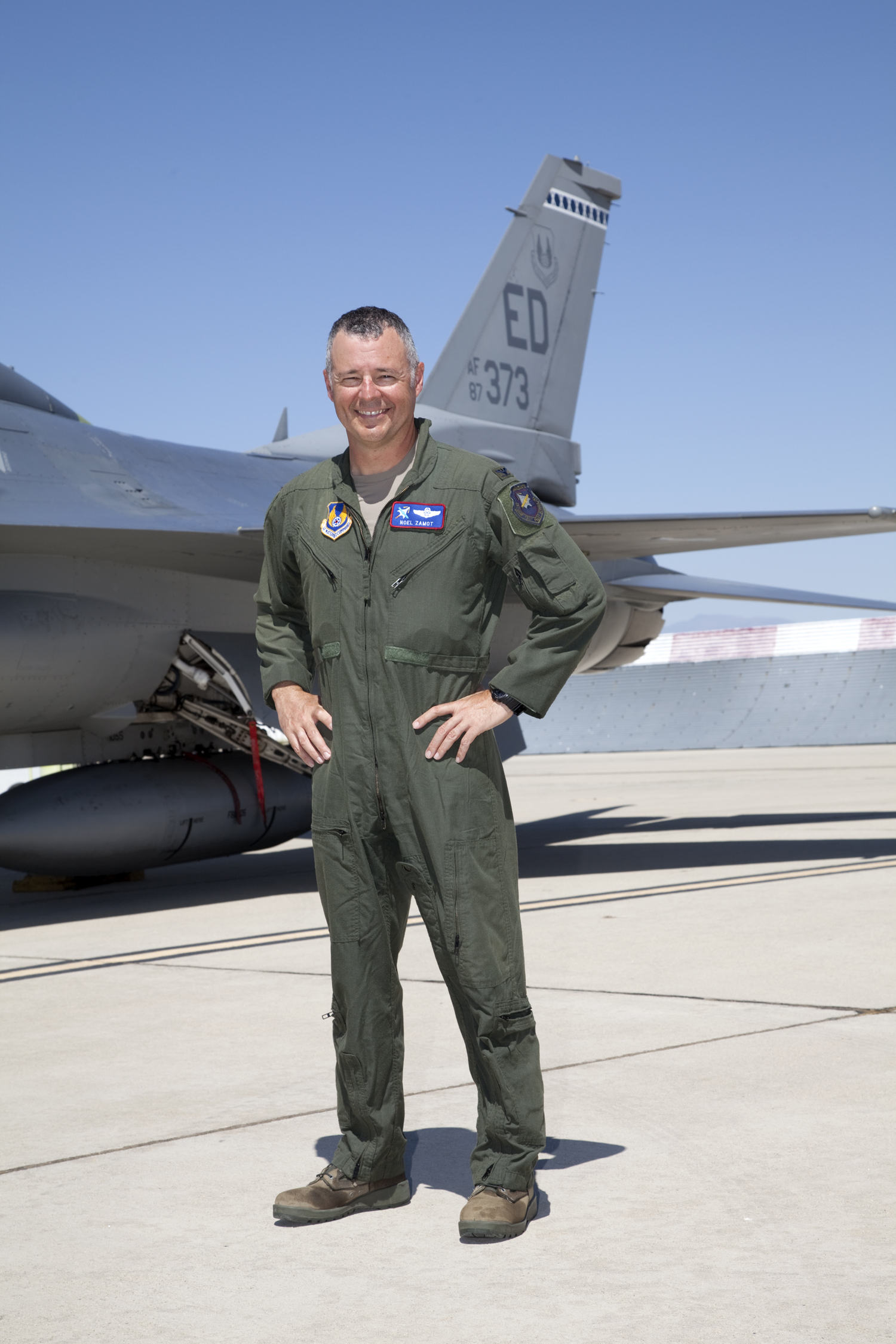
Noel Zamot

* Individual was killed in an aviation-related accident.

No	Name	Rank	From	To	Class	Notable events during tenure	Ref
1	Ralph C. Hoewing	Maj.	Sep 1944	Jan 1945	n/a	Sep 9, 1944—USAAF Flight Test Training Unit set up at Wright Field, Ohio; AT-6 introduced	
2	"Dick" Muehlberg	Lt. Col.	Jan 1945	Jan 1946	n/a	B-25, B-17, P-51 introduced; Jan 1945—School moved to Vandalia airport; School renamed Flight Performance School; Late 1945—School moved to Patterson field	
3	Ralph C. Hoewing	Maj.	Jan 1946	May 1947	n/a	Curriculum expanded to include Stability and Control testing	
4	Leonard I. Wiehrdt	Maj.	May 1947	Oct 1947	46D	Aug 1947—F-80 introduced	
5	Leo C. Moon	Lt. Col.	Oct 1947	Oct 1949	47	47—First USAF class. First class to fly jets; School renamed Air Material Command Experimental Test Pilot School	
6	Ken Chilstrom	Maj.	Oct 1949	Oct 1950	45	50C—Last class at Wright Field	
7	John R. Amann	Lt. Col.	Oct 1950	May 1956	49D	Feb 4, 1951—School moved to Edwards AFB (south base); 51A—First class held at Edwards AFB; May 1951—T-28, B-26 introduced; Apr 2, 1951—School renamed Air Research and Development Command Experimental Test Pilot School; Jan 1, 1953—School renamed USAF Experimental Test Pilot School; 1953—T-33, F-84 introduced; Jun 9, 1955—School renamed USAF Flight Test School; Mar 14, 1956—School moved to main base building 1220; 1956—F-86, F-100 introduced	
8	Herbert V. Leonhardt	Lt. Col.	May 1956	Jun 1959	55C	Jul 3, 1956—School emblem approved; Jun 17, 1957—First student field trip overseas; 1957—NB-57 introduced; Curriculum expanded from six to eight months; Number of classes per year reduced from four to three; 1958—TF-102 introduced	
9	Richard C. Lathrop	Maj.	Jun 1959	Jun 1961	55D	60B—US Army helicopter test pilot course; UH-1, F-104 introduced	
10	Robert M. Howe	Lt. Col.	Jun 1961	Jul 1962	49D, 52B	Jun 5, 1961—Aerospace Research Pilot Course introduced; 1961—T-27 space flight simulator introduced; Oct 12, 1961—School renamed USAF Aerospace Research Pilot School; Late 1962—T-38 introduced	
11	Charles E. Yeager	Col.	Jul 1962	Jul 1966	46C, 51A	NF-101 introduced; July 1, 1963—ARPS consolidated into TPS curriculum; Number of classes per year reduced from three to two; Calspan B-26, H-13 introduced; Feb 7, 1966—First Manned Orbital Laboratory (MOL) class	
12	Robert S. Buchanan	Col.	Jul 1966	May 1967	57A, I	F-106 introduced	
13	Eugene P. Deatrick Jr.	Col.	May 1967	Jun 1968	51A, 53C	NF-104, NF-106 introduced	
14	George D. Hendrix	Lt. Col.	Jun 1968	Aug 1968	57A	n/a	
15	Harold W. Christian, Jr.	Col.	Aug 1968	Jan 1971	52C	Gliders, A-7 introduced	
16	William J. Campbell	Col.	Jan 1971	Jul 1971	62C, IV	ARPS courses eliminated	
17	Edwin E. "Buzz" Aldrin	Col.	Jul 1971	Feb 1972	n/a	Systems Test Phase introduced	
18	Joseph A. Guthrie, Jr.	Col.	Feb 1972	Jul 1975	58C	Jul 1, 1972—School renamed USAF Test Pilot School; RF-4 introduced; Feb 26, 1973—Flight test engineer course initiated; Calspan NT-33, NKC-135 introduced; 74B—First student navigator and first female student flight test engineer; Sep 1, 1975—Course expanded from 44 to 46 weeks	
19	Warwick H. Glasgow	Col.	Jul 1975	Dec 1977	65C	YA-7D DIGITAC, A-37 introduced	
20	Donald T. Ward	Col.	Jan 1978	Jun 1979	ETPS FW Course 25	May 19, 1979—Boyd Hall dedicated	
21	Larry G. Van Pelt	Lt. Col.	Jun 1979	Aug 1979	66A	n/a	
22	Norman L. Suits	Col.	Aug 1979	Jun 1980	68A	n/a	
23	Donald E. Madonna*	Col.	Jun 1980	Mar 1982	66A	UV-18, U-6, Calspan LJ-24 introduced	
24	Michael E. Sexton	Lt. Col.	Mar 1982	Jul 1982	69A	82B—Air Force Institute of Technology (AFIT) program with TPS begins	
25	Kenneth E. Staten	Col.	Jul 1982	Aug 1983	68A	n/a	
26	Melvin Hayashi	Col.	Aug 1983	Jul 1985	72B	Calspan Avionics Systems Test and Training Aircraft (ASTTA) NC-131 introduced	
27	Michael D. Marks	Col.	Jul 1985	Mar 1987	75A	Dec 5, 1986—Scobee Auditorium dedicated	
28	Michael C. Kostelnik	Col.	Mar 1987	Jul 1989	77A	88B—First female student test pilot enrolled; Integrated Flight Data Acquisition System (IFDAPS) introduced	
29	Elton T. Pollock	Col.	Jul 1989	Jun 1991	76B	First USAF Reservist joined TPS staff; Test management phase added to curriculum; C-23 introduced	
30	Guy S. Gardner	Col.	Jun 1991	Aug 1992	75A	NC-141 introduced	
31	Harold T. Strittmatter	Col.	Aug 1992	Apr 1994	81B	F-16B, F-15B introduced	
32	James H. Doolittle III	Col.	Apr 1994	Aug 1996	79B	Sep 9, 1994—50th anniversary of USAF Test Pilot School; 95B—First class to use individual student cubicles and Pentium laptops; T-2, NF-16D Variable-Stability Inflight Simulator Test Aircraft (VISTA), F-15E introduced	
33	Barton E. Henwood	Col.	Aug 1996	Jul 1999	84A	NT-39 introduced; First students to visit Russia's Air Force Flight Test Facility	
34	Steve Cameron	Col.	Jul 1999	Jan 2001	85B	Students expand envelope of AGM-65 Maverick missile; Students test crash avoidance system; Test Pilot School renovated, school temporarily located in Hangar 1870; VISTA joins TPS fleet at EDW	
35	George Ka'iliwai III	Col.	Jan 2001	Jun 2003	84B	First flight test engineer and non-rated TPS Commandant; First TPS sponsorship of AFIT doctoral program	
36	Ernie H. Haendschke	Col.	Jun 2003	Jul 2005	87B	2003—Aerospace Vehicle Test Course introduced; Nov 18, 2003—TPS receives Richard G. Cross Award from ITEA; June 15, 2004—Pete Knight classroom dedicated	
37	Andre A. Gerner	Col.	Jul 2005	Jul 2007	91A	06B—First husband and wife team graduates; Process begins to make TPS a Master of Science Program	
38	Mike Luallen	Col.	Jul 2007	Jul 2010	92B	07B—First class to receive Master of Science in Flight Test; Curriculum expanded to include unmanned aerial systems; March 19, 2010—Mark Graziano classroom dedicated	
39	Noel Zamot	Col.	Jul 2010	Jun 2012	93B	2011—First Remotely Piloted Aircraft (RPA) test pilot; 2012—Flight test course for enlisted personnel; 2012—Cyber Systems Test Course introduced	
40	Paul Meyer	Col.	Jun 2012	Aug 2012	n/a	First commandant from the Air Force Reserves; First non-TPS graduate to serve as commandant since Buzz Aldrin	
41	Lars Hoffman	Col.	Aug 2012	Jul 2014	97A	Classroom renovations; Modernized Systems curriculum	
42	Charles Webb	Col.	Jul 2014	Jul 2017	TBS	Air Force Flight Test Museum used as classroom	
43	Matthew Higer	Col.	Jul 2017	Jul 2018	03A	TPS receives AF Organizational Excellence Award	
44	Ryan Blake	Col.	Jul 2018	Jul 2020	08A	TPS 75th Anniversary; New curriculum dedicated to space hardware	
45	Sebrina Pabon	Col.	Jul 2020	Jul 2023	06A	First female, flight test engineer commandant; Oct 1, 2020—Multi-Domain Test Force activation; TPS collaborates with Republic of Korea Air Force; Feb 23, 2023—Space Test Course (STC) established	
46	James Valpiani	Col.	Jul 2023	Jun 2025	EPNER Class 2014	TPS conducts world's first AI-controlled dogfights—X-62A vs F-16; TPS is a Collier Trophy Finalist; Secretary of the Air Force flies with TPS in the X-62A; TPS's first control of a satellite, in the STC; Modernization per 2024 Strategic Plan—emphasis on Data-Driven Test; AI-based mission systems upgrade for X-62; A-29s added to fleet—first new aircraft in 30 years; First ever fully-integrated, year-long Flight & Space Test Course, nicknamed "The Malhalanobians", graduates	
47	Maryann Karlen	Col.	Jun 2025	Present	12A	n/a	

== Notable alumni ==
USAF TPS has produced many notable alumni including astronauts, record-setting aviators, and senior Air Force leaders.
