= Eugene Peyton Deatrick =

American test pilot (1924–2020)

Eugene Peyton Deatrick Jr.
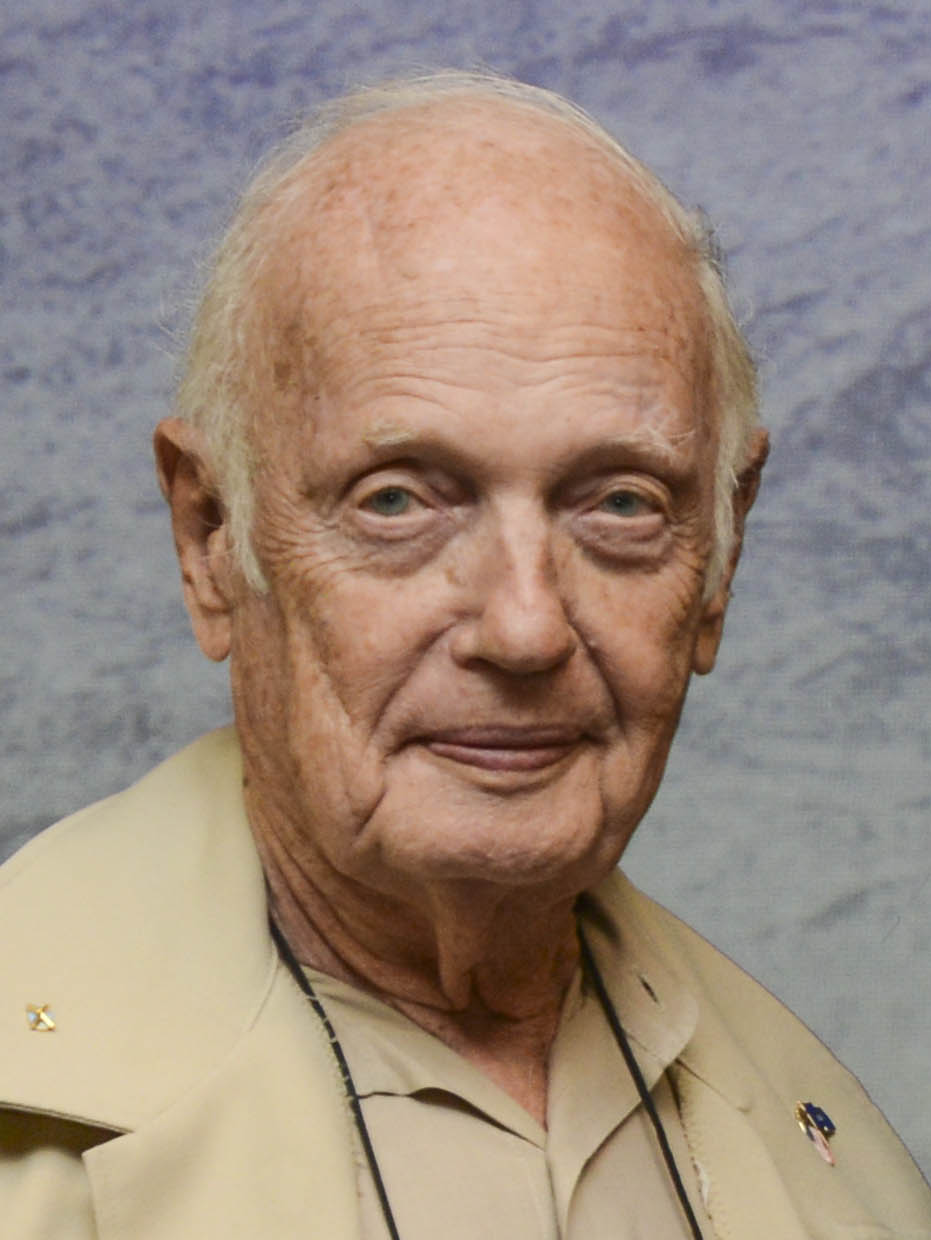
- Gene Deatrick in 2014
- Born: November 17, 1924; Pittsburgh, Pennsylvania, U.S.
- Died: December 30, 2020 (aged 96); Alexandria, Virginia, U.S.
- Burial place: Arlington National Cemetery
- Military career
- Allegiance: United States of America
- Branch: United States Air Force
- Service years: 1943–1974
- Rank: Colonel
- Nickname: Gene
- Commands: 1st Air Commando Sqdn, 1966–67; USAF Test Pilot School, 1967–68; Director of Test, AFSC, 1972–74
- Conflicts: Vietnam War
- Awards: Legion of Merit (1 OLC); DFC (1 OLC); Bronze Star w/ Valor (1 OLC); Air Medal (22 OLC)
- Other work: Aerospace Representative

Eugene Peyton Deatrick Jr. (November 17, 1924 – December 30, 2020) was a United States Air Force colonel, test pilot, and combat veteran. He is best recognized for his role in the rescue of United States Navy Lieutenant Dieter Dengler during the Vietnam War. The rescue was recounted in the Werner Herzog films Little Dieter Needs to Fly and Rescue Dawn and the national bestseller Hero Found: The Greatest POW Escape of the Vietnam War by author Bruce Henderson.

== Early life and education ==
Eugene P. Deatrick Jr. was born November 17, 1924, in Pittsburgh, Pennsylvania, the only child of Dr. Lily Bell Sefton Deatrick and Dr. Eugene P. Deatrick Sr. He grew up in Morgantown, West Virginia where his mother was a professor of Chemistry and his father a professor of Agriculture at West Virginia University. Deatrick graduated from Woodrow Wilson High School in Washington, D.C. in 1942. During his first year of college at West Virginia University, Deatrick enlisted in the Air Corps Reserve. He was nominated to the United States Military Academy by Senator Jennings Randolph in 1943.

== Military career ==
=== United States Military Academy ===
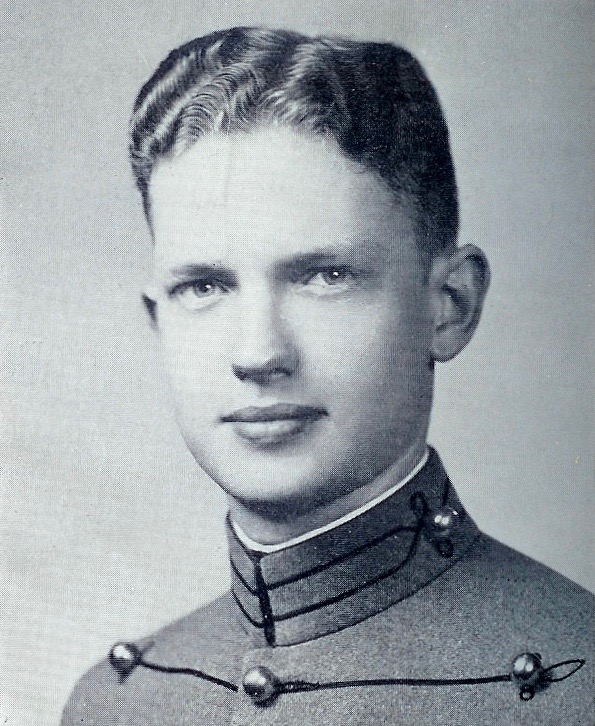
"Dea" at USMA in 1946

Deatrick arrived at West Point on July 1, 1943, and began six weeks of military training known as Beast Barracks due to the verbal abuse and hazing delivered by upper classmen to toughen the cadets. Cadets were grouped according to height, and the six-foot tall Deatrick was assigned to Company C, 1st Regiment known as "C1". Deatrick's interest in aviation was piqued during his freshman or "plebe" year when an AT-6 aircraft simulated a strafing attack on his group that was on field maneuvers sending them into the bushes to escape. As he watched the pilot wave, Deatrick decided he would apply for flight training when the opportunity arrived. A wartime change allowed cadets in their second year (known as "yearlings") to apply to become air cadets who upon graduation would receive both a commission and wings. Deatrick was accepted into the program and received basic flight training in 1945. On June 1, 1946, the air cadets received their wings from the commanding general of the Army Air Forces, Carl Spaatz. Deatrick graduated from USMA on June 4, 1946, with a merit ranking of 252 out of the 875 members of his class.

=== Air rescue ===
Deatrick entered the U.S. Army Air Corps following graduation from the United States Military Academy. Deatrick flew B-25s at Enid, Oklahoma then transitioned to the 307th Bomb Wing at MacDill AFB in Florida where he flew B-29s. From 1947 to 1948, he served a tour with the 10th Air Rescue Squadron in Adak, Alaska where he flew B-17s, L-5s, and PBYs. The noted Norwegian Arctic explorer, Colonel Bernt Balchen, was his commanding officer.

=== Flight test ===
In 1949, he was assigned to the 3759th Electronics Test Squadron whose mission was the development of new radar bombing equipment. In 1950 the squadron moved to Eglin Air Force Base, Florida as the nucleus of the new Air Armament Center. Deatrick was assigned as the Bomber Engineering Test Pilot. In addition to bombers, he flew the T-33, P-51, and the F-84. In 1951, Deatrick was a member of the first class to attend the newly formed Experimental Test Pilot School at Edwards Air Force Base, California, and subsequently served five years in the Bomber Flight Test Division at Wright-Patterson AFB, Ohio. During this tour of duty, he flew development tests on the B-47 and B-52 aircraft among many other programs.

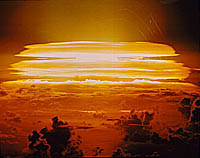
Fireball from the Cherokee thermonuclear test

Deatrick also participated in nuclear weapons effect tests in these aircraft at the Pacific Proving Grounds in 1954 and 1956. During Operation Castle, he flew a B-47 to test thermal and overpressure effects of an atomic blast on aircraft in flight. A year later, in preparation for Operation Redwing, Deatrick received B-52 instruction at Boeing Field near Seattle, Washington. In August 1955, Col. Guy Townsend "signed off" Deatrick and qualified him to fly the Boeing bomber. B‑52B serial number 52-0004, the first B model aircraft, was extensively instrumented to measure thermal, blast, and gust effects of a nuclear explosion. The aircraft was redesignated a JB-52B and nicknamed by the crew, The Tender Trap, after the movie of the same name. In March 1956, pilot Charles G. "Andy" Anderson and co-pilot Deatrick left Seattle for Eniwetok. They participated in eight "shots" including, Cherokee, the first airdrop of a thermonuclear bomb, and Zuni, the first test of a three-stage thermonuclear design.

From 1956 to 1964, Deatrick was assigned as executive officer to Major General Howell Estes Jr. He followed Estes on many assignments throughout the world. In 1965, he volunteered for Vietnam. Deatrick received indoctrination in the A-1 Skyraider at Hurlburt Field, Florida, and graduated with class Express-20.

=== Vietnam ===
In March 1966, Deatrick assumed command of the 1st Air Commando Squadron (ACS) located at Pleiku, RVN. On his fourth flight (an orientation mission), Deatrick was diverted into the A Shau Valley to help defend a Special Forces camp that was under attack. The next day, March 10, 1966, Bernie Fisher of the 1st ACS landed on the enemy-held runway and successfully rescued "Jump" Myers who had been shot down earlier that day. Fisher was later awarded the Medal of Honor for this rescue. While in Vietnam, Deatrick flew 402 combat missions in the A-1E Skyraider. He was responsible for the rescue of Lt. Dieter Dengler, United States Navy, who had escaped from a prison camp after six months of captivity. Dengler later wrote about the miraculous circumstances of his July 20, 1966 rescue:

Because the wings of a Spad are set into the fuselage right under the canopy, a pilot can see the ground directly beneath him only when he banks ninety degrees. When Gene was perhaps three seconds into this steep bank, and only during those few seconds, he saw a flash of something white on the ground, a thousand feet below. I was lying on a flat boulder and waving a parachute, but all Gene saw was that brief flash of white ... He went back for another look ... Now he saw the waving and this time the form of a man.

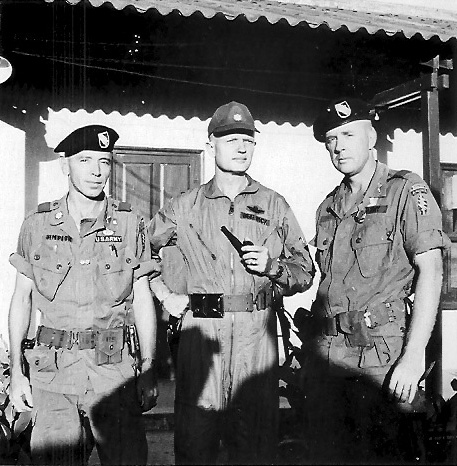
Charles M. Simpson, Eugene P. Deatrick, and Lee Parmly, Pleiku, South Vietnam, November 1966

On November 10, 1966, Deatrick came to the aid of West Point classmate, Eleazar Parmly IV, commander of Task Force (TF) Prong when it was ambushed by NVA forces. TF Prong, consisting of three Montagnard companies supported by U.S. Special Forces advisors, was acting as a screen for elements of the U.S. 14th Infantry. TF Prong was scouting in the Plei Trap Valley near the Cambodian border when it was attacked by the NVA Sixth Battalion. With the battle turning against him, Parmly radioed Captain Partridge, a Forward Air Controller working the area:

Do you know Colonel Eugene Deatrick, CO of the 1st Air Commando Squadron at Pleiku?"

"Sure do," Partridge replied.

"Good," said Parmly. "Then give him word that his old classmate is in deep shit down here."

Maybe that could be called working the old school tie till the knot got frayed. Even so, Parmly got Deatrick's forget-you-not within less than 10 minutes. … Parmly used the bombardment as cover to move his people to the east of the trail.

To strengthen ties with the soldiers they protected, Deatrick encouraged his flyers to take troops on orientation flights above the battle fields. His pilots also worked on the ground directly with the soldiers to improve communications and select munitions best-suited for close air support missions.

=== USAF Test Pilot School ===
Col. Deatrick by F-104 at Edwards Air Force Base

Deatrick returned to the United States in early 1967 and was assigned as commandant of the USAF Aerospace Research Pilot School, Edwards Air Force Base, California, from May 1967 to June 1968. During a ceremony with Colonel Deatrick on July 11, 1967, the school received its first Air Force Outstanding Unit Award for "exceptionally meritorious service" during the period of February 1, 1964 to February 1, 1966.

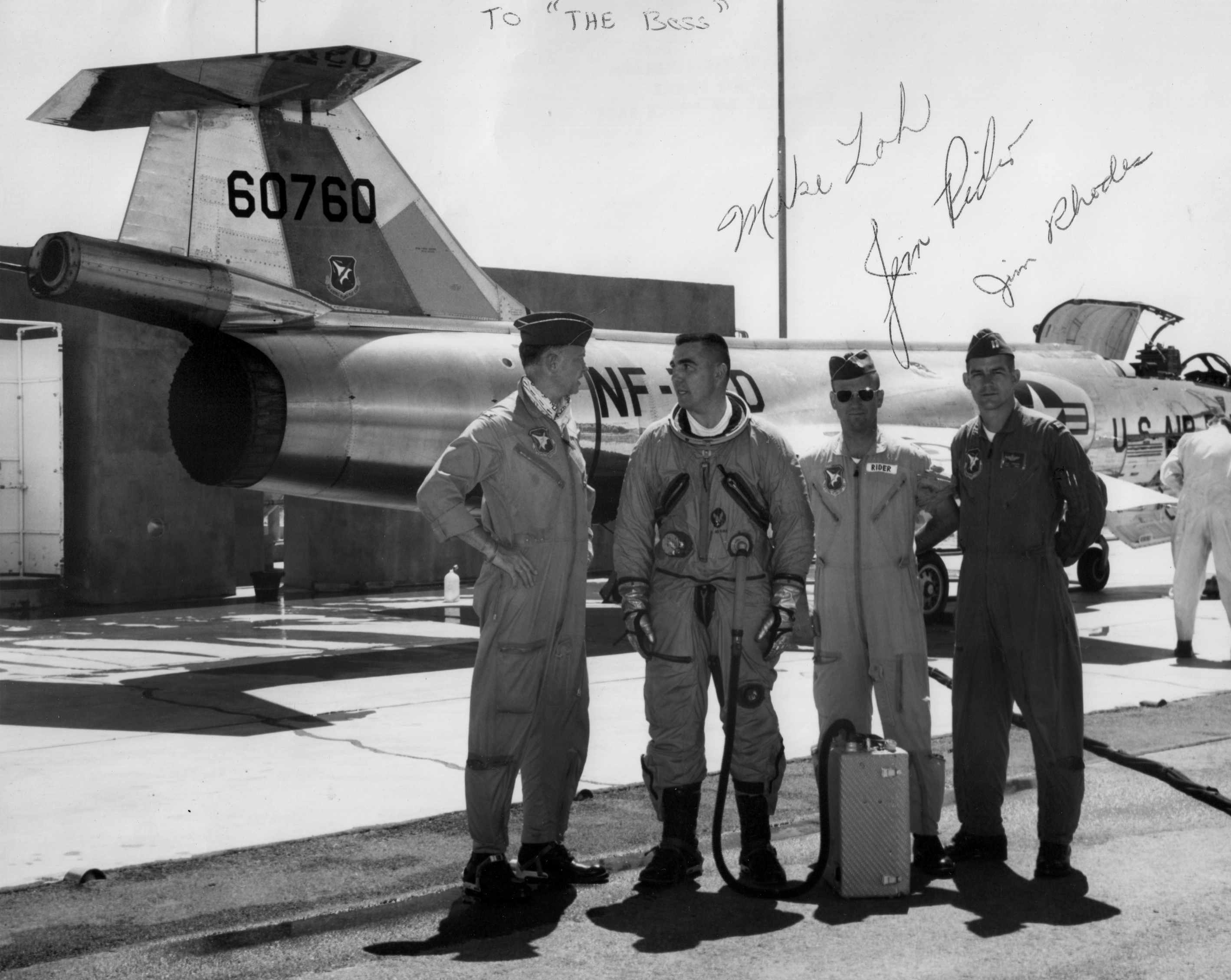
Commandant Deatrick, student Loh, and instructors Rider and Rhodes by NF-104A

During Deatrick's tenure at the school, students received the long-awaited Lockheed NF-104A—a rocket-powered variant of the F-104 intended to inexpensively train military space pilots. More than five years before, three F-104s were extensively modified to the NF-104A or Aerospace Trainer (AST) configuration that included the addition of a rocket engine and a reaction control system for flight in the upper atmosphere where the air is too thin for normal control surfaces to operate. Although the school managed the project, testing was performed not by the school's students, but by experienced test pilots from Lockheed and the Air Force Flight Test Center. Flight testing began in 1963 but was suspended when aircraft 56-0762 was destroyed on 10 December, seriously injuring the pilot. Safety modifications were made to the two remaining aircraft, and a restricted flight profile was defined that lowered the maximum altitude and decreased the climb angle. In spite of the precautions, a serious accident occurred on June 18, 1965, when an instructor flying 56-0756 experienced a hydrogen peroxide fire from the reaction control system. A nitrogen purge system was added, and after additional test flights, the school's students were finally approved for training flights in May 1968.

Students who flew the NF-104A while Deatrick commanded the school include Robert Lilac, Harry Blot, and Mike Loh. Student flights lasted only a few more years. Aircraft 56-0756 was scrapped after an inflight rocket motor explosion occurred in June 1971 and training was terminated in December of that year. As of 2016, the surviving NF-104, 56-0760, stands as a static model just outside the entrance of the USAF Test Pilot School.

On May 27, 1967, Deatrick presented an address at Kutztown State College in Pennsylvania during the unveiling of the datestone of Deatrick Hall. The men's dormitory was named in honor of Deatrick's grandfather, William Wilberforce Deatrick, who was a professor at the college. In 1968, Deatrick was selected to attend the National War College. Following his graduation in 1969, he was assigned to the Joint Staff, Office of the Joint Chiefs of Staff. Subsequently, in 1972, he became the Director of Test, Air Force Systems Command, Andrews AFB, Maryland and retired from the United States Air Force in 1974.

== Later years ==
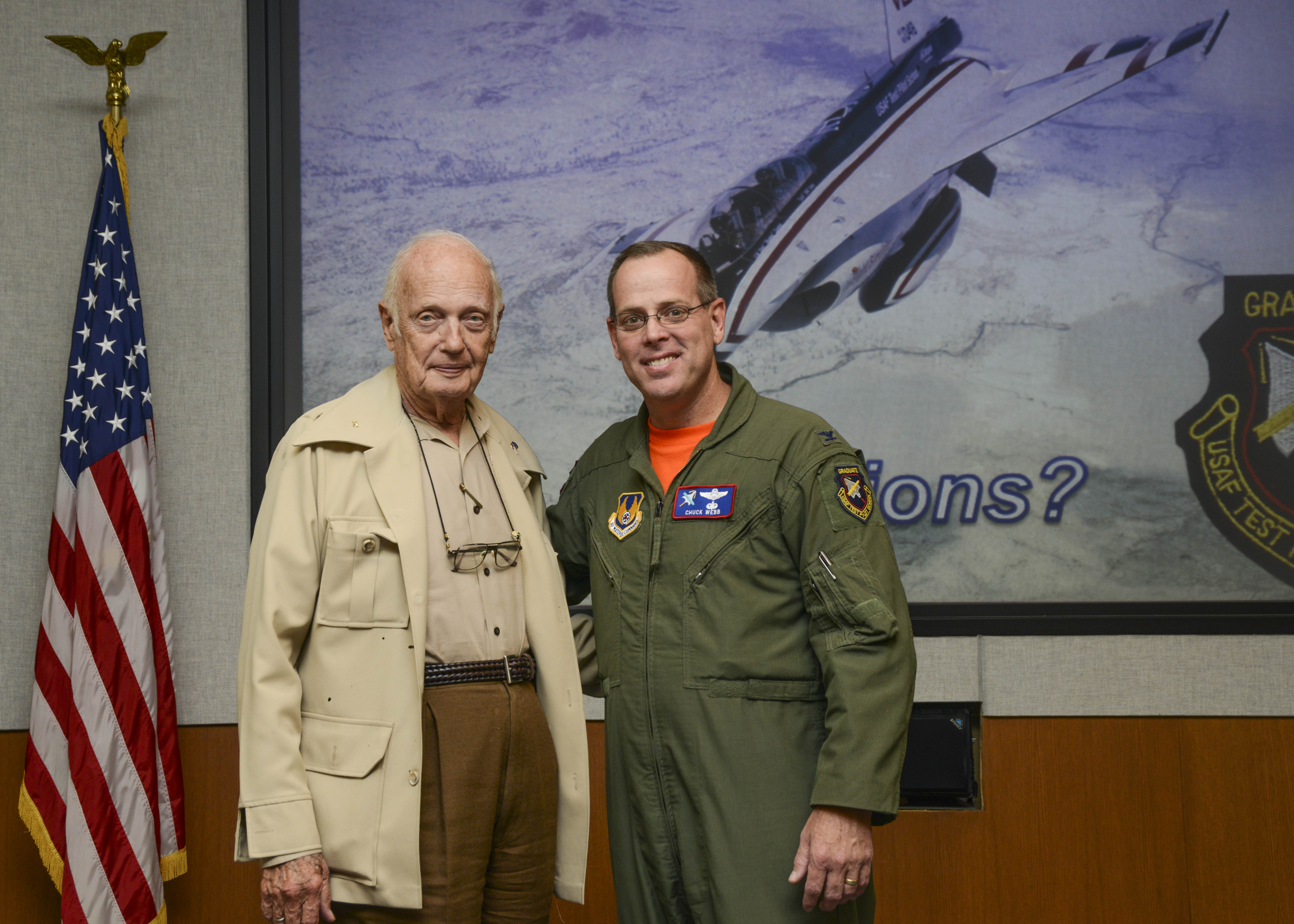
Deatrick and TPS Commandant Charles Webb in 2014

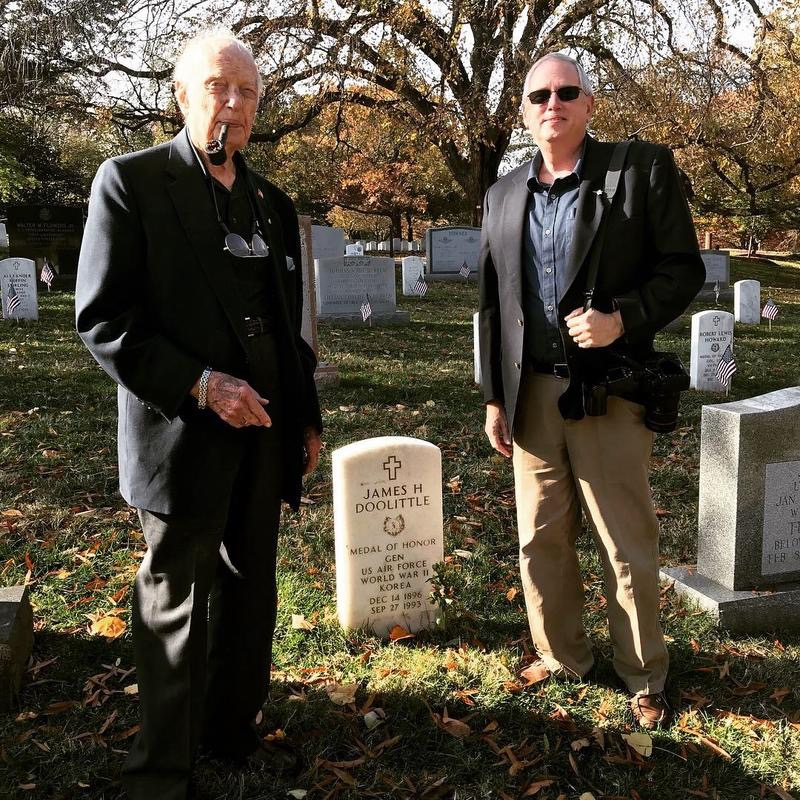
Deatrick and his son Will visiting the grave of Jimmy Doolittle at Arlington National Cemetery on Veterans Day 2018

In 1996, Deatrick portrayed himself in Little Dieter Needs to Fly, the Werner Herzog documentary about the escape and rescue of Dieter Dengler. In 1997, Deatrick was interviewed by the Air Force Historian, Richard P. Hallion, during the review of Operation TAILWIND. On March 9, 1999, on the thirty-third anniversary of the Battle of A Shau, Deatrick and other members of the 1st ACS gathered at a Pentagon ceremony to honor Bernie Fisher. In 2007, he attended the premier of Rescue Dawn at Andrews AFB and spoke of his role in Dengler's rescue. Prior to his death, he lived in Alexandria, Virginia. Deatrick's wife of 55 years, Zane, died in January 2012 and is buried in Arlington National Cemetery.

In October 2014, Deatrick returned to Edwards AFB to attend the 70th anniversary celebration of the United States Air Force Test Pilot School presented during the Flight Test Historical Foundation's Gathering of Eagles event. Before touring the school to view the many improvements since his tour as commandant in 1967, Deatrick attended a mission briefing presented by current TPS commandant, Colonel Charles Webb Jr. Deatrick was especially pleased to find that TPS students now receive a Master of Science degree in flight test engineering upon graduation.

He died on December 30, 2020, at the age of 96. He was laid to rest with his wife at Arlington National Cemetery in Section 53, Grave 2458 on September 13, 2021.

== Awards and honors ==
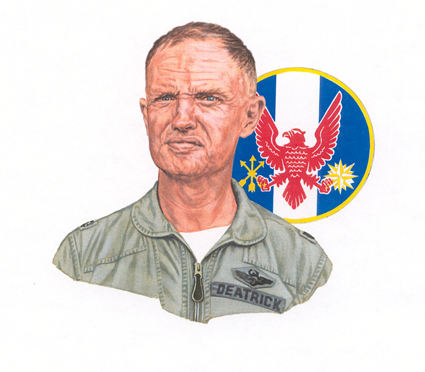
Deatrick's Gathering of Eagles 2000 Lithograph

During his career, Deatrick flew more than 50 different types of aircraft and accumulated more than 12,000 hours of flying. He was awarded the Legion of Merit with one oak leaf cluster, the Distinguished Flying Cross with one oak leaf cluster, the Bronze Star with Valor device and one oak leaf cluster, and the Air Medal with 22 oak leaf clusters. In 1969, he earned a master's degree from George Washington University.

Deatrick was one of the twelve founding members of the East Coast chapter of the Society of Experimental Test Pilots (SETP) in 1959, and he served as symposium chairman for the sixth annual SETP conference in 1962. Deatrick was made an honorary member of the American Fighter Aces Association in 1967. He served as President of the National Aviation Club for three years and is a member of the International Order of Characters, the Order of Daedalians, the Air Force Association, and the Quiet Birdmen. In 1995, Deatrick and Dengler presented a lecture at the Estrella Warbird Museum describing Dengler's imprisonment and rescue. The lecture was well received and eventually recorded as part of the National Museum of the United States Air Force's Guest Lecture Series. In January 1999, he received the National Aeronautic Association's Cliff Henderson Award for Aviation Achievement.

In 2000, Deatrick was awarded membership in the Gathering of Eagles Program along with other noted aviators including Duke Cunningham, Fitz Fulton, Michael Novosel, Günther Rall, Ed Rector, and Chuck Yeager. In 2001, Deatrick was selected as the Distinguished Alumnus of the U.S. Air Force Test Pilot School and spoke at the graduation dinner banquet. In 2005, he received the National Aeronautic Association's Wesley L. McDonald Elder Statesman of Aviation award for his service to the United States military, especially as one of its top test pilots. In 2006, Deatrick was an invited panelist for the 38th National Conference on Aviation and Space Education's Hangar Talk tribute to the late Scott Crossfield. In 2007, he was recognized as a "famous flyer" of the A‑1 Skyraider. At the 51st Symposium in Anaheim, California, Deatrick was interviewed as part of SETP's History Series documenting the flight test careers of noted test pilots. In 2018, SETP released a video of Deatrick's oral history interview. In 2019, the West Point Center for Oral History interviewed Deatrick and released a video of his career. In 2021, Deatrick's career was chronicled in the journal of the Air Force Historical Foundation, Air Power History.

Insignia	Command pilot		
Row 1	Legion of Merit w/ 1 oak leaf cluster	Distinguished Flying Cross w/ 1 oak leaf cluster	Bronze Star Medal w/ valor device and 1 oak leaf cluster
Row 2	Air Medal w/ 22 oak leaf clusters	Air Force Commendation Medal w/ 1 oak leaf cluster	American Campaign Medal
Row 3	World War II Victory Medal	National Defense Service Medal w/ service star	Antarctica Service Medal
Row 4	Vietnam Service Medal	Republic of Vietnam Gallantry Cross with Palm	Republic of Vietnam Campaign Medal

== See also ==
- Commandants of the U.S. Air Force Test Pilot School
- List of U.S. Air Force Test Pilot School alumni
- List of United States Military Academy alumni
