= Journal of the Military Operations Research Society of Korea =

South Korean academic journal

The Journal of the Military Operations Research Society of Korea is a peer-reviewed academic journal run by the Military Operations Research Society in South Korea. It features both English and Korean articles in the areas of Military strategy, Operations research, Political economy, and Case analyses. Founded in 1975, it is one of the oldest and one of the most-cited academic journals in South Korea, and is considered to be highly influential in rendering public policy decisions.

== See also ==
- Military Operations Research Society
