= Robert L. Stephens =

American test pilot (1921–1984)

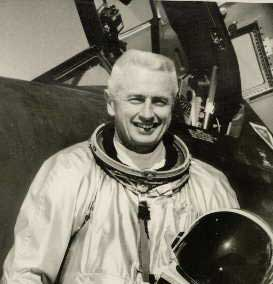
- Colonel Robert L. Stephens by YF-12 in 1965
- Born: December 1, 1921; Gilmer, Texas, U.S.
- Died: May 21, 1984 (aged 62); Munich, West Germany
- Burial place: Gilmer City Cemetery
- Military career
- Allegiance: United States of America
- Branch: United States Army Air Forces; United States Air Force
- Service years: 1943–1973
- Rank: Colonel
- Nickname: The Silver Fox
- Commands: Chief of Fighter Operations, Edwards AFB, 1952–55; Test Director F-104 1954–58; Test Director YF-12 and SR-71 1963–68
- Awards: Legion of Merit; Distinguished Flying Cross; Meritorious Service Medal
- Other work: Aerospace Representative

Robert L. "Silver Fox" Stephens (December 1, 1921 – May 21, 1984) was a United States Air Force test pilot who set several speed and altitude records while testing the Lockheed YF-12 and SR-71.

== Biography ==
=== Early years ===
Robert L. Stephens was born on December 1, 1921, and raised in Gilmer, Texas, graduating from Gilmer High School in 1939 and from Texas A&M University in 1943 with a Bachelor of Science degree in Aeronautical Engineering. The son of Mr. and Mrs. Vernon J. Stephens, he entered the Army Air Corps in 1943 and flew P-47s in combat during World War II. After the war, he earned a Master of Science degree in Aeronautical Engineering from Princeton University.

=== Test pilot ===
Stephens rose to the top of his profession as a test pilot for some of the most exotic aircraft in the USAF inventory. In 1949, he graduated from the Air Materiel Command Experimental Test Pilot School at Wright-Patterson Air Force Base with Class 49D. He was called the "Silver Fox" due to his prematurely gray hair which he kept in a neatly trimmed crew cut. In 1952, Stephens arrived at Edwards Air Force Base, California to serve as Chief of Fighter Operations. From 1963 to 1968, he served as test director of the YF-12 and SR-71 test force. He was the first military pilot to fly the YF-12A interceptor and the SR-71 reconnaissance aircraft.

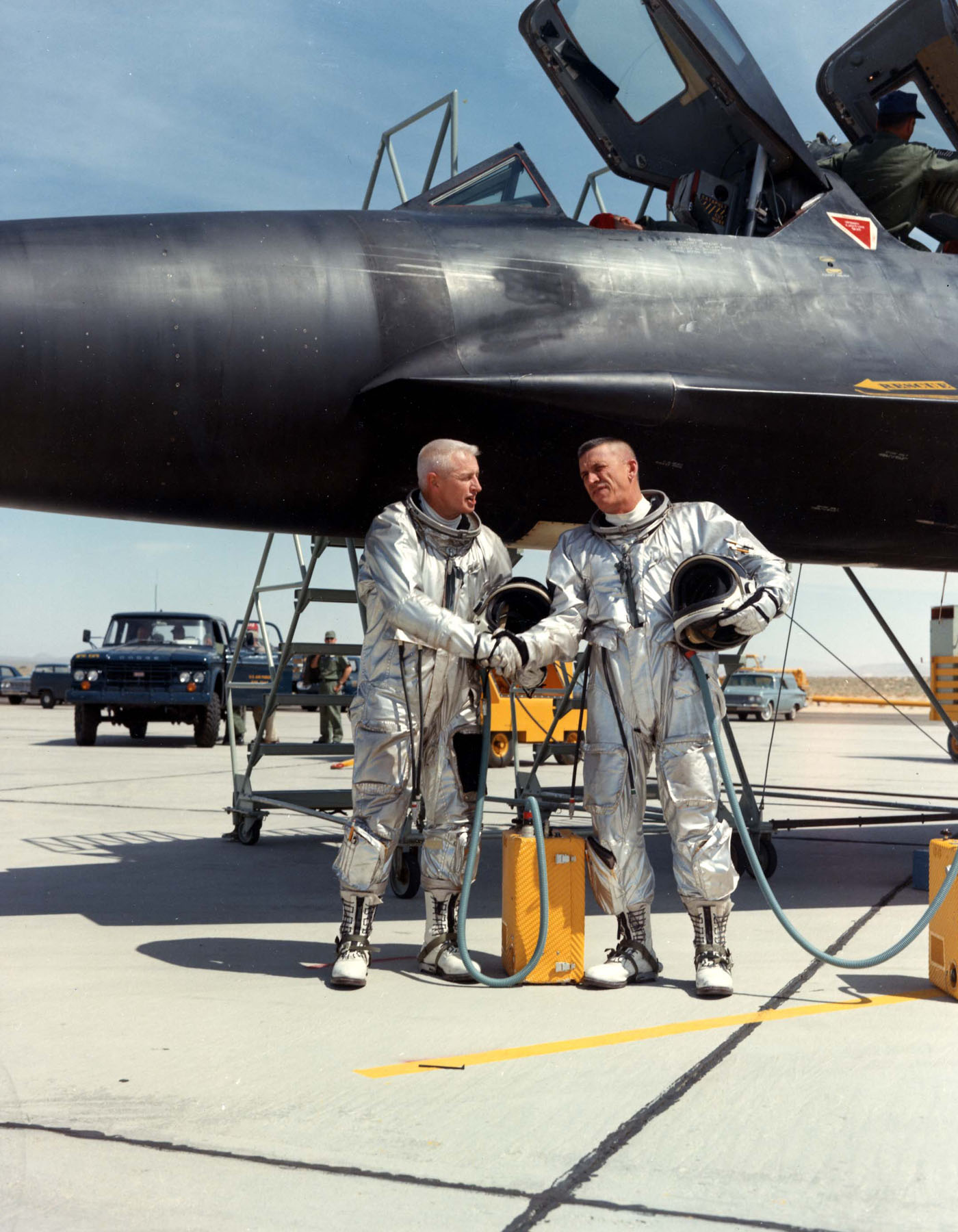
Stephens and Andre after their record setting YF-12A flight in 1965

Stephens flew nearly all jet fighter aircraft of the 1940s and 1950s era from the F-80 Shooting Star to the F-106 Delta Dart. He flight tested the YF-100A, YF-102, XF-104, X-5, X-1B, Navy F2H3, F4D, the F-94 series, F-86, F-89D, F-89H, and YF-101. He served as test director for the F-104 program and performed the first wingtip fuel tank jettison test. On this flight, the fuel tanks slammed into the fuselage of the F-104 instead of falling free. Stephens made an emergency landing and saved the aircraft. Working with Lockheed engineers and other aviation consultants, he helped solve this and other problems with the F-104.

On May 1, 1965, at Edwards Air Force Base, pilot Stephens and fire control officer Daniel Andre, established four world speed and altitude records in the YF-12A. They averaged 2,070 miles per hour over a 17-kilometer straight away course, then held 80,257 feet to establish a world record for sustained horizontal flight. These records stood until 1977 when they were surpassed by an SR-71.

After retiring from the military in 1973, Stephens was the U.S. representative for the German jet engine firm, MTU.

=== Personal life ===
Stephens died in 1984 in Munich, Germany and was buried in Gilmer City Cemetery. He is survived by his widow, Joy, and three daughters.

== Honors ==
Stephens was awarded the following medals for his military service: Legion of Merit, Distinguished Flying Cross, and the Air Force Meritorious Service Medal. He was also honored with the 1965 Thompson Trophy, 1965 Mackay Trophy, Flying Tiger Trophy, Fédération Aéronautique Internationale Gold Medal, De la Vaulx Medal, Golden Plate Award of the American Academy of Achievement, and the city of Lancaster Aerospace Walk of Honor. On June 18, 1966, a parade was held in Gilmer, Texas to celebrate "Bobby Stephens Day". On October 20, 2000, in Gilmer, Texas the Gilmer Airfield officially changed its name to "Fox Stephens Field" in honor of Colonel Stephens.

Stephens was a member of the International Order of Characters and was a Fellow and past president of the Society of Experimental Test Pilots.
