= Military Operations Research Society =

The Military Operations Research Society (MORS) is a society for professionals active within defense applications of operations research (OR) in the United States. Memberships include analysts, researchers, consultants and officers in the United States Department of Defense, organizations within the military of the United States, various think tanks, academic institutions and consultancy firms.

The Military Operations Research Society arranges symposia and courses, it also publishes books, a quarterly bulletin called Phalanx, and a peer reviewed journal called Military Operations Research. Participation in MORS activities generally requires a United States security clearance. MORS is headquartered in Alexandria, Virginia.

The MORS has served the Department of Defense analytic community for over forty years and now also includes other aspects of national security for the United States federal government. Under the sponsorship of the Army, Navy, Air Force, Marine Corps, Office of the Secretary of Defense, the Joint Staff and the Department of Homeland Security, the objective of MORS is to enhance the quality and effectiveness of operations research as applied to national security issues.

MORS vision is to "become the recognized leader in advancing the national security analytic community through the advancement and application of the interdisciplinary field of Operations Research to national security issues, being responsive to our constituents, enabling collaboration and development opportunities, and expanding our membership and disciplines, while maintaining our profession’s heritage." This vision encompasses all aspects of national security including not only the military, but also Homeland Security and the other agencies of government – including the US and its allies.

Members of the Society include a cross section of the defense analysts, operators and managers from government, industry and academia. Their involvement fosters professional interchange within the military operations research community, the sharing of insights and information on challenging national security issues and specific support to decision makers in the many organizations and agencies that address national defense. MORS provides an array of meetings and publications. In particular, the Society provides a unique environment in which classified presentations and discussions can take place with joint service participation and peer criticism from the full range of students, theoreticians, practitioners and users of military analysis. Throughout its activities, the Society promotes professional methodology, individual excellence and ethical conduct.

== History ==
Before and during World War II, OR was an area of military analysis, so original membership of the Operations Research Society of America (ORSA), founded in 1952, included many practitioners within military OR. Gradually, the scope of ORSA became wider, but still includes a Military Applications Society.

In August 1957, the first Military Operations Research Symposium ("MORS") was held in California under the sponsorship of the Office of Naval Research in Pasadena and initially were gatherings of the military OR community on the west coast of the United States.

In 1962 these symposia had become national and joint in focus. In April 1966, the Military Operations Research Society was incorporated in order to handle these symposia, and in 1989 MORS was adopted as the acronym of the society while the symposia were called MORSS.

The First Military Operations Research Symposium (MORS), sponsored by the Office of Naval Research (ONR) – Pasadena, was held at Corona Naval Ordnance Lab, Corona, California in August 1957. The subject was Air Defense; 83 scientists attended. This and subsequent early meetings were oriented to fulfill the needs of the Operations Research Community on the West Coast. Starting with the Eighth MORS the Symposia became nationally oriented, joint-service meetings. The first national Symposium was the Ninth MORS held at Fort Monroe, Virginia in April 1962. From the First through the 10th MORS there was no formal organization to stage the meetings. They were conducted by ONR – Pasadena with the help of a volunteer steering committee.

Beginning with the 11th MORS, ONR – Washington assumed their supervision and hired a contractor to perform the work in cooperation with a volunteer executive committee. This arrangement continued until April 1966 at which time the Military Operations Research Society was incorporated. In 1989, the symposia became the Military Operations Research Society Symposia (MORSS) and MORS became the acronym for the Society.

During its over forty years, MORS has expanded its services. In addition to conducting the classified Symposium, MORS holds several other special meetings and workshop annually. The Society also publishes abstracts, monographs, brochures, a quarterly bulletin – PHALANX and a refereed journal – Military Operations Research, for professional exchange and peer criticism among students, theoreticians, practitioners and users of military operations research.

Since its incorporation in 1966, MORS has been led by a Board of Directors. This consists of 28 voting members and two non-voting members – the Chief Executive Officer and the Immediate Past President. The Board is also led by an Executive Council consisting of The President, the President-Elect, the Immediate Past President, the Vice President for Financial Management, the Vice President for Societal Services, the Vice President for Member Services, the Secretary of the Society and the Chief Executive Officer.

MORS also makes unclassified documents and information available. The Military Operations Research Society is a professional Society incorporated under the laws of Virginia. The Society does not make or advocate official policy nor does it attempt to influence the formulation of policy. Matters discussed or statements made in the course of MORS symposia or printed in its publications represent the opinions of the authors and not of the Society.

=== Military Operations Research Society Symposium ===
MORSS	YEAR	LOCATION	Attendance
1	1957	NOL Corona	83
2	1958	Stanford Research Institute	94
3	1958	RAND	105
4	1959	NPS	119
5	1960	NEL San Diego	124
6	1960	NRDL San Francisco	154
7	1961	Boeing Seattle	160
8	1961	PMR Point Mugu	248
9	1962	Fort Monroe	171
10	1962	SDC Santa Monica	248
11	1963	USNA	347
12	1963	USAFA	309
13	1964	ICAF	411
14	1964	USNAB Coronado	413
15	1965	AFSC Norfolk	424
16	1965	Sand Point NAS	471
17	1966	NPS-II	588
18	1966	Fort Bragg	441
19	1967	Fort Bliss	554
20	1967	National Bureau of Standards	518
21	1968	USAFA-II	553
22	1968	NPS-III	651
23	1969	USMA	587
24	1969	NTC San Diego	621
25	1970	USCGA	505
26	1970	NPS-IV	513
27	1971	Air University	362
28	1971	Fort Lee	520
29	1972	USAFA-III	614
30	1972	Fort Lee-II	482
31	1973	USNA-II	792
32	1973	NPS-V	783
33	1974	USMA-II	613
34	1974	Fort Eustis	601
35	1975	USNA-III	627
36	1975	FBI Academy	605
37	1976	Fort Bliss-II	543
38	1976	Fort Eustis-II	584
39	1977	USNA-IV	883
40	1977	NPS-VI	714
41	1978	NDU	811
42	1978	USNWC	623
43	1979	USMA-III	735
44	1979	Vandenberg AFB	642
45	1980	USNA-V	803
46	1980	USNWC-II	588
47	1981	NDU-II	876
48	1981	NPS-VII	762
49	1982	Kirtland AFB	644
50	1983	USNA-VI	890
51	1983	AFIT	710
52	1984	USACGSC	836
53	1985	USAFA-III	839
54	1986	NDU-III	909
55	1987	Air University-II	549
56	1988	NPS-VIII	783
57	1989	USACGSC-II	918
58	1990	USNA-VII	943
59	1991	USMA-IV	826
60	1992	NPS-IX	943
61	1993	AFIT-II	835
62	1994	USAFA-IV	952
63	1995	USNA-VIII	1127
64	1996	USACGSC-III	920
65	1997	MCCDC, MCB Quantico	1103
66	1998	NPS-X	1067
67	1999	USMA-V	960
68	2000	USAFA-V	1053
69	2001	USNA-IX	1174
70	2002	USACGSC-IV	862
71	2003	MCCDC-II	1117
72	2004	NPS-XI	1103
73	2005	USMA-VI	907
74	2006	USAFA-VI	979
75	2007	USNA-X	1044
76	2008	USCGA-II	934
77	2009	USACGSC-V	957
78	2010	MCCDC-III	1201
79	2011	NPS-XII	1071
80	2012	USAFA-VII	1029
81	2013	Alexandria, VA	410 (300 in person 110 virtual)
82	2014	Alexandria, VA	661
83	2015	Alexandria, VA	830
84	2016	Quantico, VA	824
85	2017	United States Military Academy	784
86	2018	The Naval Postgraduate School	923
87	2019	United States Air Force Academy	
88	2020	Virtual	
89	2021	Virtual	
90	2022	Marine Corps University	
91	2023	United States Military Academy	
92	2024	The Naval Postgraduate School	
93	2025	National Conference Center, Lansdowne, VA	
94	2026	United States Air Force Academy	

== See also ==
- I/ITSEC
- Journal of the Military Operations Research Society of Korea
- Simulation Interoperability Standards Organization
