= International Test and Evaluation Association =

- Abbreviation: ITEA
- Formation: 1980
- Type: INGO
- Region served: Worldwide
- Official language: English, French
- Website: www.itea.org

The International Test and Evaluation Association (ITEA) is a professional body founded in 1980. Its primary purpose is to further the exchange of technical information in the field of test and evaluation. Membership is open to professionals, students and corporate bodies involved in the development and application of policy and techniques used to assess the effectiveness, reliability, and safety of new and existing systems and products.
