= Richard P. Hallion =

Richard Hallion
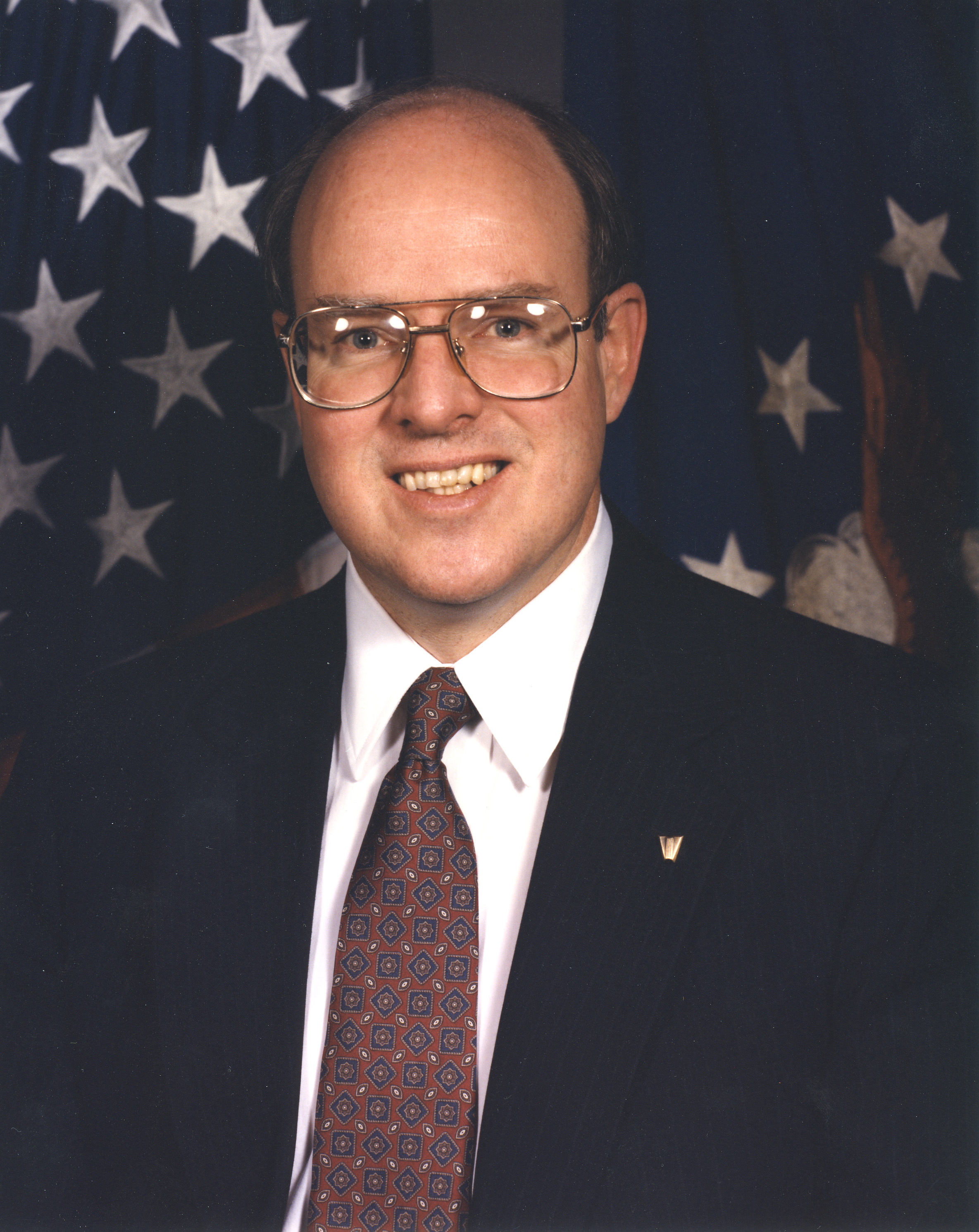
- Hallion in 2006
- Education: University of Maryland, College Park (PhD)
- Years active: 1970-present

Richard P. Hallion is Senior Adviser for Air and Space Issues, Directorate for Security, Counterintelligence and Special Programs Oversight, the Pentagon, Washington, D.C. He is responsible for analysis and insight regarding the conceptualization, evolution and utilization of sensitive national technological programs and related subject areas.

Hallion graduated from the University of Maryland, College Park in 1970. He has experience in science and technology museum development, research and management analysis, and has served as a consultant to various professional organizations. He has flown as a mission observer in a range of military and civilian fixed and rotary-wing aircraft. Hallion is the author and editor of various books relating to aerospace technology and military operations, as well as articles and essays for a variety of professional journals. He also teaches and lectures widely.

== Education ==
- 1970 Bachelor of Arts degree, high honors, University of Maryland, College Park
- 1975 Doctor of Philosophy degree, University of Maryland, College Park
- 1992 Federal Executive Institute, Charlottesville, Va.
- 1993 National Security Studies Program, John F. Kennedy School of Government, Harvard University, Cambridge, Mass.

== Career chronology ==
1. November 1974 - May 1980, Curator of Science and Technology, and Curator of Space Science and Exploration, National Air and Space Museum, Smithsonian Institution, Washington, D.C.
2. May 1980 - January 1982, adjunct professor, University of Maryland, College Park
3. January 1982 - May 1986, Chief Historian, Air Force Flight Test Center, Edwards Air Force Base, Calif.
4. May 1986 - August 1987, Director, Special Staff Office, Aeronautical Systems Division, Wright-Patterson AFB, Ohio
5. August 1987 - October 1988, Harold Keith Johnson Visiting Professor of Military History, Army War College, Carlisle Barracks, Pa.
6. October 1988 - September 1990, Executive Historian, Directorate of Advanced Programs, Headquarters Air Force Systems Command, Andrews AFB, Md.
7. September 1990 - May 1991, Charles A. Lindbergh Visiting Professor of Aerospace History, National Air and Space Museum, Smithsonian Institution, Washington, D.C.
8. June 1991 - November 1991, senior issues and policy analyst, Secretary's Staff Group, Office of the Secretary of the Air Force, Washington, D.C.
9. November 1991 - November 2002, the Air Force Historian, Bolling AFB, Washington, D.C.
10. November 2002 - October 2003, Technical Adviser for Air Force Historic Events, Air Force Centennial of Flight Office, the Pentagon, Washington, D.C.
11. October 2003 – present, Senior Adviser for Air and Space Issues, Directorate for Security, Counterintelligence and Special Programs Oversight, the Pentagon, Washington, D.C.

== Awards and honors ==
- 1982 - 1983 AIAA Distinguished Lecturer
- 1984, 1985 Lt. Col. Roy Mase Trophy, Air Force Systems Command
- 1984, 1985 Commander's Distinguished Paper Award, Air Force Systems Command
- 1985 Citation of Honor, Air Force Association
- 1986 Meritorious Civilian Service Medal, U.S. Air Force
- 1988 Commander's Award for Public Service, U.S. Army
- 1990 Ira Eaker Award, Air University
- 1993 Aviation Space Writers Association Premier Award for defense aviation coverage
- 2000 Friend of the Society of Experimental Test Pilots
- 2004 Inaugural Fellow, Earthshine Institute of the Charles and Anne Morrow Lindbergh Foundation
- 2005 Associate Fellow, American Institute of Aeronautics and Astronautics
- 2005 Distinguished Lecturer, American Institute of Aeronautics and Astronautics
- 2005 Annual Award of the Conference of Historic Aviation Writers
- 2007 A. Verville Smithsonian Fellowship

== Professional memberships and associations ==
- National Defense Industrial Association
- American Institute of Aeronautics and Astronautics
- Royal United Services Institute for Defence and Security Studies
- Air Force Association
- Military Operations Research Society
- Precision Strike Association
- National Association of Scholars
- Exchange Club of Capitol Hill

== Publications ==
=== As author ===
- Supersonic Flight: Breaking the Sound Barrier and Beyond. Macmillan. 1977.
- Legacy of Flight: The Guggenheim Contribution to American Aviation. University of Washington Press. 1977. ISBN 0-295-95542-2.
- Test Pilots: The Frontiersmen of Flight. Doubleday. 1981.
- Designers and Test Pilots. Time-Life Books. 1982.
- The Path to the Space Shuttle: The Evolution of Lifting Reentry Technology. U.S. Air Force. 1983.
- The Literature of Aeronautics, Astronautics, and Air Power. U.S. Air Force. 1984.
- Rise of the Fighter Aircraft, 1914-1918. Nautical and Aviation Publishing. 1984.
- On the Frontier: Flight Research at Dryden. NASA. 1985.
- The Evolution of Commonality in Fighter and Attack Aircraft Development and Usage. U.S. Air Force. 1985.
- The Naval Air War in Korea. Nautical and Aviation Publishing. 1986.
- Strike from the Sky: The History of Battlefield Air Attack, 1911-1945. Smithsonian Institution Press. 1989. ISBN 9780874744521.
- Storm Over Iraq: Air Power and the Gulf War. Smithsonian Institution Press. 1992.
- Taking Flight: Inventing the Aerial Age from Antiquity Through the First World War. Oxford University Press. 2003. ISBN 0-1951-6035-5.

=== As editor ===
- The Wright Brothers: Heirs of Prometheus. Smithsonian Institution Press. 1978.
- Apollo: Ten Years Since Tranquility Base. Smithsonian Institution Press. 1979.
- The Hypersonic Revolution: Eight Case Studies in the History of Hypersonic Technology, two volumes. U.S. Air Force. 1987–1988.
- Air Power Confronts an Unstable World. Brassey's. 1997.
- Silver Wings, Golden Valor: The USAF Remembers Korea. U.S. Air Force. 2006.
