= Wumpscut discography =

- Studio albums: 18
- Compilation albums: 13
- Singles: 18
- EPs: 7

The comprehensive discography of Wumpscut, a Germany-based electro-industrial artist, consists of eighteen studio albums, seven EPs, thirteen compilation albums, and eighteen singles.

== Studio albums ==
Year	Album details	Release notes
1991	Defcon: Released: 1991; Format: Compact Cassette	1991 Defcon (Örli Wörks); 1992 Defcon (Second Edition)
1991	Small Chambermusicians: Released: 17 Dec, 1991; Format: Compact Cassette	
1993	Music for a Slaughtering Tribe: Released: 1993; Format: CD	1993 Music for a Slaughtering Tribe (VUZ); 1993 Music for a Slaughtering Tribe (VUZ and Subtronic); 1993 Music for a Slaughtering Tribe: Farewell Edition (VUZ); 1997 Music for a Slaughtering Tribe II; 2000 Music for a Slaughtering Tribe II: 2000 Edition; 2000 Music for a Slaughtering Tribe II (Metropolis); 2002 Music for a Slaughtering Tribe: Seamless Audio Edition; 2002 Music for a Slaughtering Tribe: Back is Front Edition; 2005 Music for a Slaughtering Tribe (Remastered); 2005 Music for a Slaughtering Tribe (Metropolis)
1995	Bunkertor 7: Released: 1995; Format: CD, LP	1997 Bunkertor 7 (Beton Kopf Media) ETAH 2; 1997 Bunkertor 7 (Discordia); 2000 Bunkertor 7 (Connected); 2000 Bunker Gate Seven (Metropolis); 2002 Bunkertor 7 (Connected)
1995	Preferential Legacy: Released: 1995; Format: LP	
1997	Embryodead: Released: 1997; Format: CD	#20 CMJ RPM chart (US)
1997	Music for a German Tribe: Released: 1997; Format: LP	
1999	Boeses Junges Fleisch: Released: 1999; Label: Beton Kopf Media; Format: CD	#25 CMJ RPM chart (US) #17 Album, German Alternative Charts (DAC) 1999: 1999 EEvil Young Flesh (Metropolis); 1999 Fleshbox; 2000 Boeses Junges Fleisch (Connected); 2002 Boeses Junges Fleisch: Seamless Audio Edition; 2002 Boeses Junges Fleisch (Beton Kopf Media); 2004 Boeses Junges Fleisch (Beton Kopf Media)
2001	Wreath of Barbs: Released: 2001; Format: CD	#13 CMJ RPM Chart (US)
2004	Bone Peeler: Released: 2004; Format: 2xCD	
2005	Evoke: Released: 2005; Format: CD	
2006	Cannibal Anthem: Released: 2005; Format: CD	
2007	Body Census: Released: 2007; Format: 2xCD	
2008	:Schädling: Released: 2008; Format: CD	
2009	:Fuckit: Released: 2009; Format: CD	
2010	:Siamese: Released: 2010; Format: CD	
2011	Schrekk & Grauss: Released: 2011; Format: CD	
2012	Women and Satan First: Released: 2012; Format: CD	
2013	Madman Szpital: Released: March 29, 2013; Format: CD	
2014	Bulwark Bazooka: Released: April 18, 2014; Format: CD	
2015	BlutSpukerTavern: Released: April 3, 2015; Format: CD	
2016	Wüterich: Released: March 25, 2016; Format: CD	
2021	Fledermavs 303: Released: April 2, 2021; Format: CD	
2021	Poison Cookie: Released: April 21, 2023; Format: CD	
2024	Schlossgheist	
2025	Chew Chew Chew	

== Extended plays ==
Year	Album details	Release notes
1994	Dried Blood: Released: 1994; Format: CD	1994 (Discordia); 1995 (Discordia); 1995 (Ant-Zen Records); 1997 Dried Blood of Gomorrha
1994	Smell the Disgusting Sweet Taste of Dried Blood: Released: 1994; Format: 7"	Limited Edition
1994	Gomorra: Released: 1994; Format: CD	1995 Gomorrha (Beton Kopf Media); 1997 Dried Blood of Gomorrha
1997	Deejaydead: Released: 1997; Format: CD	
2000	Excerpts from Bloodchild: Released: 2000; Format: CD	
2005	Blondi: Released: 08 Mar 2005; Format: CD	
2007	Goth Census: Released: 2007; Format: CD	

== Compilations ==
Year	Album details	Release notes
1995	The Mesner Tracks: Released: 1995; Format: CD	
1995	Fear in Motion: Released: 1995; Format: Cassette	
1997	Born Again: Released: 1997; Format: CD	
1997	Dried Blood of Gomorrha: Released: 1997; Format: CD	2008 The Dried Blutkind of Gomorrha Works
2000	Blutkind: Released: 2000; Format: CD	#5 DAC Top 50 Albums of 2000 (Germany) #17 CMJ RPM Charts (U.S.): Released as Bloodchild in the U.S.; 2008 The Dried Blutkind of Gomorrha Works
2002	Liquid Soylent: Released: 2002; Format: 2xCD	
2003	Preferential Tribe: Released: 2003; Format: CD	
2006	Killer Archives: Released: 2006; Format: CD	
2007	Completer 1: Released: 2007; Format: CD	
2008	The Dried Blutkind of Gomorrha Works: Released: 2008; Format: CD	
2008	Dwarf Craving: Released: 2008; Format: CD	
2009	DJ Dwarf Nine: Released: 2009; Format: CD	
2010	DJ Dwarf Ten: Released: 2010; Format: CD	
2011	DJ Dwarf Eleven: Released: 2011; Format: CD	

== Singles ==
Year	Album details	Release notes
1995	The Oma Thule Single: Released: 1995; Label: OBUH Records; Format: 7"	Limited Edition
1999	Ich Will Dich: Released: 1999; Label: Beton Kopf Media; Format: CD	
1999	Totmacher: Released: 1999; Label: Beton Kopf Media; Format: CD	
2001	DJ Dwarf One: Released: 2001; Label: Beton Kopf Media; Format: CD	#9 DAC Top 50 Singles 2001, Germany Also released as "Deliverance"
2002	DJ Dwarf Two: Released: 2002; Label: Beton Kopf Media; Format: CD	
2002	Wreath of Barbs MCD Pack (Back is Front Edition): Released: 2002; Label: Beton Kopf Media; Format: CD	
2003	DJ Dwarf Three: Released: 2003; Label: Beton Kopf Media; Format: CD	#10 DAC Top 100 Singles 2003, Germany
2004	Our Fatal Longing/Rise Again: Released: 2004; Label: Beton Kopf Media; Format: CD	
2004	DJ Dwarf Four: Released: 2004; Label: Beton Kopf Media; Format: CD	
2005	Evoke/Don't Go: Released: 2005; Label: Beton Kopf Media; Format: 12"	
2005	DJ Dwarf Five: Released: 2005; Label: Beton Kopf Media; Format: CD	
2005	Wreath of Barbs (Selected Remix Works): Released: 2005; Label: Beton Kopf Media; Format: CD	
2006	DJ Dwarf Six: Released: 2006; Label: Beton Kopf Media; Format: CD	#19 DAC Top 100 Singles 2006, Germany
2006	Jesus Antichristus / Die Liebe: Released: 2006; Label: Beton Kopf Media; Format: CD	
2007	DJ Dwarf Seven: Released: 2007; Label: Beton Kopf Media; Format: CD	
2008	DJ Dwarf Eight: Released: 2008; Label: Beton Kopf Media; Format: CD	
2009	Cut the Boo: Released: 03 Apr 2009; Label: Beton Kopf Media; Catalogue #: ETAH 86; Country: Germany; Format: 7", 33 ⅓ RPM	Limited Edition
2011	Schrekk & Grauss Remixes: Released: 01 Apr 2011; Label: Self-Released; Format: MP3	Schrekk & Grauss (Igniis/Por Ser Mortal Remix) is 192 kbit/s Schrekk & Grauss (Solitary Experiments Remix) is 256 kbit/s.
