= Blutkind =

Studio album by Wumpscut
- Released: 2000
- Recorded: 2000
- Genre: Industrial
- Length: 2:10:15
- Label: Beton Kopf Media
- Producer: Rudy Ratzinger

Wumpscut chronology
Boeses Junges Fleisch (1999)	Blutkind (2000)	Wreath of Barbs (2001)

Blutkind ("Bloodchild" in English) is a double album released in 2000 by the German industrial group Wumpscut. The album is mostly a collection of Wumpscut's earliest material, with the exception of the new tracks 'Hang Him Higher' and 'Praise Your Fears'. Some tracks are taken from Wumpscut's original demo tapes in 1991 and 1992 and some are remixes from "Music for a Slaughtering Tribe". There are also 17 or so previously unreleased old tracks. The original tapes are: 'Defcon' and 'Small Chambermusicians'. Remixes from "Music for a Slaughtering Tribe" are: 'Koslow', 'Soylent Green' and 'Default'.

The album ranked #5 on the German Alternative Charts (DAC) Top 50 Albums of 2000.

== Track listing ==
Bloodchild (2000 edition by Metropolis Records)

CD 1

1. "Hang Him Higher" - 6.02
2. "Koslow (First Take)" - 3.19
3. "Anaesthetics" - 3.42
4. "Time Ticks Away" - 3.15
5. "Stomp" - 2.16
6. "Flangegod" - 4.21
7. "Irak1 (First Take)" - 4.11
8. "Irak1 (Second Take)" - 4.15
9. "Logic Of War" - 2.21
10. "Crucified" - 3.50
11. "Neolith" - 4.14
12. "Pornography" - 4.20
13. "The Hellion" - 4.03
14. "Run like hell part 1" - 3.23
15. "Run like hell part 2" - 3.04
16. "Soylent Green (instrumental take)" - 6.12
17. "Default (Alternative mix)" - 2.26

CD 2

1. "Multimedia track"
2. "Praise Your Fears" - 5.10
3. "The Dark Chamber" - 4.20
4. "Frozen Images" - 5.20
5. "Phase Shifter" - 3.38
6. "Throbberstalk" - 4.16
7. "Clinics" - 1.38
8. "K-u-t-t" - 4.26
9. "Equal Eye" - 4.12
10. "Slovakian Hell" - 4.44
11. "March of the crying" - 3.20
12. "Irak2" - 4.47
13. "To The Sky" - 4.47
14. "Eternal" - 3.03
15. "Lamandier" - 1.35
16. "Tschuesch Domos" - 3.15
17. "Zech Groove" - 3.39

== See also ==
- Wumpscut
- List of Works by Rudy Ratzinger
