= List of aviators by nickname =

This is a list of aviators by nickname.

== A ==
- "Aggy" – Noel Agazarian, British, Battle of Britain ace
- "Assi" – Hans Hahn, German fighter pilot during World War II

== B ==
- "Bake" – V. H. Baker, British pilot and aircraft designer
- "The Balloon Buster" – Frank Luke, American World War I fighter ace
- "Bam" – C. S. Bamberger, British RAF World War II pilot
- "Barron" – John Worrall, British World War II RAF pilot
- "Beazle" – Hugh John Beazley, Battle of Britain pilot
- "Bee" – Roland Beamont, Battle of Britain pilot
- "Ben" – George Bennions, Battle of Britain ace
- "Big Joe" – Joe McCarthy, RAF Bomber Command pilot (617 Squadron) in the Second World War
- "Bing" – K. B. B. Cross, British World War II RAF pilot
- "Bird" – Herbert Carmichael Irwin, Irish commander of British airships including R101
- "Black Swallow of Death" – Eugene Bullard, African-American World War I fighter pilot
- "The Black Devil"(Russ.), "Bubi"(Ger.) – Erich Hartmann, German fighter ace
- "Blondie" – Arnold Walker, British World War II RAF pilot
- "Bo" – Elwyn King, Australian World War I fighter ace
- "Bobbi" – Evelyn Trout, American aviator
- "Bomber" – Arthur T. Harris, British commander of RAF Bomber Command during World War II
- "Bomber George" – Harold L. George, USAAC precision bombing specialist (to distinguish him from "Fighter" George)
- "Boom" – Hugh Trenchard, British World War I Royal Flying Corps general and founder of the Royal Air Force (for his loud voice)
- "Boy"
  - Peter Mould, British Second World War fighter ace
  - Geoffrey Wellum, British Second World War fighter pilot
- "Bubi" (German, "young boy", "kid")
  - Erich Hartmann, German fighter ace
  - Alfred Schreiber, German jet ace
- "Buck" – Robert McNair, Canadian fighter ace
- "Bud" – George E. Day, American POW
- "Bully" – Emil Lang, World War 2 Luftwaffe fighter ace
- "Bunny" – Christopher Currant, British RAF fighter ace in World War II
- "Butch"
  - Arthur T. Harris, British commander of RAF Bomber Command during World War II (from "butcher"; affectionately given by his men)
  - Edward O'Hare, American World War II fighter ace and Medal of Honor recipient
- "Butcher" – Arthur T. Harris, British commander of RAF Bomber Command (Air Chief Marshal) during World War II (affectionately given by his men)
- "Buzz"
  - Edwin E. Aldrin, Jr., American aviator and astronaut
  - George Beurling, Canadian RAF fighter ace (a nickname he never acknowledged)

== C ==
- "Cats Eyes" – John Cunningham, Battle of Britain pilot
- "Chappie" – Daniel James, Jr., American Air Force general
- "Chuck" – Charles Elwood Yeager, World War II USAAF fighter ace and first pilot to break the sound barrier in level flight
- "Cobber" – Edgar J. Kain, Second World War RAF fighter ace
- "Cobra" – Ronald Stein, USAF fighter ace
- "Cocky" – Hugh Dundas, British Second World War RAF fighter ace
- "Cowboy" – Howard Peter Blatchford, Battle of Britain pilot
- "Crow" – Denis Crowley-Milling, Battle of Britain pilot
- "Cloudy" – Werner Christie, Norwegian fighter ace

== D ==
- "Demon of Rabaul" – Hiroyoshi Nishizawa, Imperial Japanese Navy Air Service fighter ace
- "Dizzy" – H. R. Allen, RAF fighter ace and author
- "Dogs" – John Dundas, RAF Battle of Britain fighter ace
- "Dogsbody" – Douglas Bader, RAF fighter ace (radio callsign while Wing Commander of Tangmere)
- "Dolfo" – Adolf Galland, German fighter ace
- "Dookie" – Jenna Dolan, first woman to fly the AV-8B Harrier II in combat
- "Dutch" – Petrus Hugo, South African WW2 pilot

== E ==
- "The Eagle of Crimea" – Pavel V. Argeyev, Russian World War I flying ace

== F ==
- "Fighter George" – Harold George, USAAC fighter ace (to distinguish him from "Bomber" George)
- "Fighter of Libau" – Erich Rudorffer, World War II German ace
- "Fish" – Herman Salmon, American test pilot
- "Flotte Lotte" – Charlotte Möhring, German female pilot
- "Flying Knight of the Northland" – Clennell H. Dickins, Canadian pioneer bush pilot

== G ==
- "Gabby" – Francis Gabreski, American Army Air Force fighter ace
- "Ginger" – James Lacey, British fighter ace
- "Grumpy" - George Unwin, British fighter ace, Battle of Britain

== H ==
- "Hamish" – T. G. Mahaddie, Bomber Command pilot, Pathfinder Force
- "Hap" – Henry H. Arnold, American Army Air Forces commanding general
- "Hasse" – Hans Wind, Finnish fighter ace
- "Hilly" – Mark Henry Brown, Battle of Britain pilot
- "Hipshot" – Danny Hamilton, US Air Force Reserve
- "Hoagy" – Peter Carmichael, British fighter pilot
- "Hooter" – Steve Rainey, American test pilot
- "Hoppy" – Colin Hodgkinson, British fighter pilot

== I ==
- "Igo" – Ignaz Etrich, Austrian aviator and aircraft builder
- "Illu" – Ilmari Juutilainen, top Finnish World War II fighter ace

== J ==
- "Jack" – John Frost, South African Air Force pilot
- "Jake" – Leon Swirbul, co-founder of Grumman Aircraft
- "JB" – James Brown, American test pilot
- "Jimmy" – John S. Thach, American Navy fighter ace
- "Johnnie" – James E. Johnson, British RAF fighter ace
- "Johnny" – George L. Johnson, British WW2 RAF bomber navigator

== K ==
- "Kaos" – Art Nalls, American test pilot and air show pilot
- "Killer" – Clive Caldwell, Australian RAAF flying ace
- "Kinch" – Iven Kincheloe, American test pilot

== L ==
- "Little Dragon" – Muhammad Mahmood Alam, Pakistani fighter ace
- "Lock" – Ormer Locklear, American stunt pilot
- "Lucky Breeze" – George Scott, British Royal Naval Air Service pilot and airship pilot

== M ==
- "The Mad Major" – Christopher Draper, British World War I fighter ace
- "Mick" – Edward Mannock, British World War I fighter ace
- "Mouse" – Gordon Cleaver, Battle of Britain pilot
- "Mutt" – Joseph Summers, British test pilot
- "Miketop" – Mike Tendino, test pilot
- "Mover" – C.W. Lemoine, American author, former military aviator, and YouTuber

== O ==
- "One Armed Mac" – James MacLachlan, a British World War 2 ace who flew with a prosthetic arm

== P ==
- "Paddy"
  - Hubert Adair, Battle of Britain pilot
  - Brendan Finucane, Irish World War II RAF fighter ace
  - W. H. Harbison, British RAF officer
- "Pancho" – Florence L. Lowe, American pioneer aviator
- "Pappy"
  - Greg Boyington, American World War II U.S. Marine Corps fighter ace
  - Paul Gunn, American World War II Army Air Force bomber pilot
- "Pete"
  - Frank K. Everest, Jr., American test pilot
  - Marc Mitscher, American World War II carrier admiral
  - Elwood R. Queseda, American fighter ace
- "Petit Rouge" (French: Little Red) – Manfred von Richthofen, German fighter ace
- "Pick" - Percy Charles Pickard, well known in England during the Second World War, KIA during the Amiens prison raid
- "Pritzl" – Heinz Bär, German fighter ace, because of his affection for Pritzl candy bars.
- "Punch" – Clennell H. Dickins, Canadian pioneer bush pilot

== R ==
- "Ratsy" – George Preddy, P-51 Mustang ace
- "Red" – Eugene Tobin, American who flew with the RAF during the Battle of Britain
- "The Red Baron" (German, der Rote Baron) – Manfred von Richthofen, German fighter ace
- "The Red Battle-flyer" (German: der rote Kampfflieger) – Manfred von Richthofen, German fighter ace
- "The Red Knight" – Manfred von Richthofen, German fighter ace
- "Reeste" – Heinz Bär, German fighter ace

== S ==
- "Sailor" – Adolph Malan, South African RAF fighter ace
- "Sandy" – Brian Lane, RAF Battle of Britain pilot, Squadron Leader and fighter ace
- "Sexy Rexy" – Ola Mildred Rexroat, Women Airforce Service Pilot (WASP) aviator
- "Shorty" – Vernon Keogh, American who flew with the RAF during the Battle of Britain (named for diminutive height)
- "The Silver Fox" – Robert L. Stephens, record-setting American test pilot
- "Skip" – Jean Ziegler, American test pilot on Bell X-1 program
- "Slew" – John S. McCain, Sr., American naval aviator and chief of Bureau of Aeronautics
- "Snort" – Dale Snodgrass, American naval aviator, demonstration pilot, and commander of Fighter Wing, U.S. Atlantic Fleet
- "Snow Eagle" – Clennell H. Dickins, Canadian pioneer bush pilot
- "Spig" – Frank W. Wead, U.S. Navy aviator and screenwriter
- "Spuds" – Theodore Ellyson, pioneer U.S. Navy aviator
- "Stan" – Roderic Dallas, top Australian fighter ace of World War I
- "Stapme" – Gerald Stapleton, British Battle of Britain fighter ace
- "Strafer" – Geoffrey Warnes, No. 263 Squadron RAF
- "Stuffy" – Hugh Dowding, British commander of RAF Fighter Command from before the war into the Battle of Britain
- "Sawn Off Locky" – Eric Lock, Battle of Britain pilot

== T ==
- "Taffy" – Trafford Leigh-Mallory, Fighter Command Group commander during the Battle of Britain
- "Tex" – David L. Hill, American fighter pilot
- "Tim" – John Elkington, Battle of Britain pilot
- "Timbertoes" – Sydney Carlin, Battle of Britain gunner who lost a leg in World War I
- "Titch" – George Palliser, Battle of Britain pilot

== U ==
- "Uncle Wiggly Wings" – Gail S. Halvorsen, American Air Force officer

== W ==
- "Wop" – Wilfrid R. May, Canadian pioneer bush pilot
- "Whitey" – Edward L. Feightner, American fighter ace and Blue Angels solo
- "White Eagle" – Clennell H. Dickins, Canadian pioneer bush pilot
- "Willie" – Hugh Wilson, RAF aviator
- "Winkle" – Eric Brown, British naval aviator and test pilot
- "Wrong Way" – Douglas Corrigan, American aviator (from having to lie to the Civil Aeronautics Board to fly the Atlantic)

== Z ==
- "Zulu"
  - Albert Lewis, Battle of Britain pilot
  - George Lloyd World War I pilot

== See also ==
- Nickname
- Lists of nicknames – nickname list articles on Wikipedia
