= Evoke =

Evoke may refer to:

- Evocation, the act of calling upon or summoning a spirit, demon, deity or other supernatural agent
- E'voke, a British female vocal duo
- Evoke (album), a 2005 electro-industrial album by Wumpscut
- Evoke Motorcycles, a Chinese manufacturer of electric motorcycles

== See also ==
- Evoked potential
- Evocation (disambiguation)
- Invoke (disambiguation)
