= Blondie =

Blondie is a term sometimes used to refer to a person with blonde hair.

Blondie or Blondi may also refer to:

== People ==
- Blondie (nickname), a list of people
- Debbie Harry, the lead singer of the band Blondie who is sometimes erroneously referred to by that name

== Arts and entertainment ==
- Blondie (band), an American rock band formed in 1974
  - Blondie (album), 1976 debut album by Blondie
- Blondi (EP), a 2005 EP by German musician Wumpscut
- Blondie (comic strip), a long-running newspaper comic strip named after its blond-haired main character, launched in 1930
  - Blondie (film series) (1938–1950), a comedy series based on the comic strip
    - Blondie (1938 film)
  - Blondie (radio series) (1939–1950), a radio comedy series based on the comic strip
  - Blondie (1957 TV series), the NBC TV series based on the comic strip
  - Blondie (1968 TV series), the updated, short-lived, CBS TV series based on the comic strip
- Blondie (1975 film), a French film
- Blondie (2012 film), a Swedish film
- Blondie, the title character of the film Blondie Johnson (1933), played by Joan Blondell
- Blondie, the nickname of the Man with No Name, Clint Eastwood's nameless character in The Good, the Bad and the Ugly (1966)

== Other uses ==
- Blondie (confection), a brownie made without chocolate
- Blondi, Adolf Hitler's German Shepherd dog
- Blondie, the reserve boat of the Cambridge University Women's Boat Club (founded 1940)

== See also ==
- Theraphosa blondi (Goliath birdeater), a species of tarantula in the family Theraphosidae
- Blondy (disambiguation)
