= Invoke =

Invoke may refer to:

- Invocation, a form of supplication or prayer
- "Invoke", a 2005 single by T.M.Revolution for Mobile Suit Gundam SEED
- Invoke Solutions, a market research company founded in 1999 and based in the United States
- Invoke (smart speaker), developed by Harman Kardon and powered by Microsoft's intelligent personal assistant, Cortana
- Invoke Image Display, an IHE Integration Profile that simplifies the task of integrating non-image-aware systems
- Invoke Malaysia, a Malaysian non-profit organisation founded by the People's Justice Party (PKR) vice-president Rafizi Ramli in 2016
- inv, Python's kind of Make tool

== See also ==
- Evoke (disambiguation)
- Invocation (disambiguation)
