= Blondie (nickname) =

Blondie is the nickname of:

- Blondie Chaplin (born 1951), South African singer, songwriter and musician, briefly part of the Beach Boys
- Gwendolyn Chisolm (1959–2026), American rapper and former member of female hip hop The Sequence; sometimes incorrectly credited as Blondie
- Dave Colclough (born 1964), Welsh poker player nicknamed "El Blondie"
- Blondie Forbes, American poker player credited with inventing Texas Hold'em
- Herbert Hasler (1914–1987), British Royal Marine lieutenant colonel during the Second World War
- Blondie Robinson, American stage performer, vaudeville and minstrel.
- Arnold Walker (RAF officer) (1917–2008), British Second World War fighter pilot
- Debbie Harry (born 1945), lead singer of the band Blondie, who is sometimes referred to by that name
- Clint Eastwood's character in the film The Good, the Bad and the Ugly

== See also ==
- Oscar Ramírez (born 1964), Costa Rican footballer nicknamed "El Machillo" ("The Blondie")
- Blondy (disambiguation)
