= Invocation (disambiguation) =

Invocation is a form of supplication or prayer.

Invocation or Invoking may also refer to:

== Computing ==
- Invocation, a method of starting a subroutine
- Implicit invocation, a style of software architecture in which a system is structured around event handling, using a form of callback

== Film and television ==
- "Invocation" (The X-Files), a 2000 episode of the television series The X-Files
- The Invoking, a 2013 American psychological thriller film

== Poetry ==
- "Invocation, or The Eternal Father and Mother," a poem by Eliza R. Snow better known as "O My Father"

== Music ==
- Invocation, a British early music group led by Timothy Roberts

=== Albums ===
- Invocation (William Lloyd Webber album), 1998
- Invocation (Sympathy album), 2002
- Invocation (Dew-Scented album), 2010
- Invocations/The Moth and the Flame (Keith Jarrett album), 1980

=== Songs ===
- "Invocation", a song by Ab-Soul from the 2016 album Do What Thou Wilt.
- "Invocation", a song by the Carpenters from their 1969 debut album Ticket to Ride

== See also ==
- Invoke (disambiguation)
- Evocation (disambiguation)
