= Born Again (Wumpscut album) =

Remix album by Wumpscut
- Released: 1997

Born Again is a remix collection of Wumpscut songs from previous albums.

== Track listing ==
Track number	Track title	Length
1.	Is It You [Scintillating Mixx]	6:38
2.	Womb [Born Again Remixx]	5:55
3.	Angel [Deejay Dead Remix]	5:44
4.	Embryodead [Deejaydead Remixx]	6:06
5.	Golgotha [Roughly Distorted Version]	6:11
6.	Wumpsex [#]	4:04
7.	Womb [Miserable Days Mixx]	4:47
8.	War [Revenge and Nemesis Version]	7:00
9.	Man's Complete Idiot [#]	3:07
10.	Thorns [Distant Vocals Version]	5:50
11.	Down Where We Belong [Instrumental Take 1]	3:35
12.	Embryodead [Cockroach Modified]	4:32
13.	Vaporize [:Wumpscut: Remix]	5:10
14.	Die in Winter [U.S. -- Bonus on Bunker Gate 7][*]	4:04

== See also ==
- List of Works by Rudy Ratzinger
