= Bunkertor 7 =

Studio album by Wumpscut
- Released: September 1, 1995
- Recorded: 1995
- Genre: Industrial
- Length: 51:38
- Label: Beton Kopf Media
- Producer: Rudy Ratzinger

Wumpscut chronology
Music for a Slaughtering Tribe (1993)	Bunkertor 7 (1995)	The Oma Thule Single (Single) (1995)

Bunkertor 7 is an album recorded by the German industrial act, Wumpscut. It was released in Compact Disc format on Beton Kopf Media in 1997, with the catalog number ETAH 2. It was released under the title Bunker Gate Seven by Metropolis Records in North America.

It was first distributed in Europe by Discordia, later in 1997 by Nova Tekk, and again by Connected in 2000 and 2002. There are at least ten different versions of the album (including varied artwork and track lists).

Bunkertor 7 was inspired by the 1981 short film by Caro/Jeunet Le bunker de la dernière rafale (a.k.a. The Bunker of the Last Gunshots). It contains samples from the movie, notably the alarm sound on "Dying culture". The images in the LP's booklet, including the cover are from the film.

Sputnikmusic staff member Trey assigned a rating of 3.0 to the album's "Re-Sample" edition, calling it "much more than a re-issue. This 1995 electro-industrial classic has been completely re-recorded with help from Haujobb and Stillste Stund."

== Contributing members ==
All songs on Bunkertor 7 were written, performed and produced by Rudy Ratzinger.

Bunkertor 7 was engineered by Spinnw.ebi, and all artwork was by Stephan Alt.

== Track listing ==
No.	Title	Length
1.	"Open Gate"	1:18
2.	"Torn Skin"	5:30
3.	"Dying Culture" (Second Movement)	4:18
4.	"Bunkertor 7" (German Texture)	4:41
5.	"Mortal Highway"	4:47
6.	"Corroded Breed"	4:16
7.	"Die in Winter"	4:48
8.	"Bunkertor 7" (Reprised)	4:59
9.	"Capital Punishment"	5:49
10.	"Thorns"	5:51
11.	"Tell Me Why"	4:22
12.	"Close Gate"	0:59
Total length:		56:37

== Notable samples ==
Track 3, "Dying Culture" (Second Movement)", contains the alarm sound sampled from the 1981 short film by Caro/Jeunet Le bunker de la dernière rafale (The Bunker of the Last Gunshots).

Track 8, "Bunktertor 7 (Reprised)", includes a sample from the movie Kindergarten Cop. The children of the kindergarten class say "never talk to strangers" and it is looped throughout parts of the song. The sample is played at a higher speed and pitch than the direct sample.

Track 10, "Thorns", has no vocals, but contains a modified sample from the 1986 film Highlander of The Kurgan (Clancy Brown) telling the character Ramirez (Sean Connery), "Tonight you sleep in hell".
