= Women and Satan First =

Studio album by Wumpscut
- Released: 2012
- Genre: Electro-industrial
- Label: Beton Kopf Media

Wumpscut chronology
Fuckit	Women and Satan First

Professional ratings
Review scores
Source	Rating
Brutal Resonance	8/10 stars

Women and Satan First is a 2012 album by Wumpscut.

Artwork for the album cover was created by German 'photo artist' Thomas Buchta depicting Satan as an elderly naked man accompanied by female nudes, in front of a tan backdrop.

In November 2011 Wumpscut announced the album with a remix contest, inviting fans to download remix packs for 'Grobian' and 'Kill That Little Fuck' and then submit their mixes.

A limited edition deluxe 'Satan Box' edition was released on 6 April 2012, containing two CDs (a copy of the original album plus a disc of remixes), access to exclusive remix MP3 downloads (these remixes were made by fans in response to the competition), a shirt, a flag, a booklet, a calendar and other related items.

A limited edition 180-gram vinyl edition containing a poster, booklet and download links for the tracks was also released in April 2012.

== Track listing ==
1. Hallelujah - 4:33
2. Women And Satan First - 3:58
3. Death Panacea - 5:18
4. Kill That Little Fuck - 5:25
5. Burial on Demand - 4:34
6. Grobian - 6:40
7. L'Enfer Noir - 5:46
8. Blutsturtz, Baby - 4:06
9. Cunnilingus Creuzfeur - 4:36
10. Kaufe Deine Seele - 5:09
