= Evocation (disambiguation) =

Evocation is the act of calling or summoning a spirit, demon, deity or other supernatural agent, in the Western mystery tradition.

Evocation may also refer to:

- Evocation I: The Arcane Dominion, a 2009 folk album by Eluveitie
  - Evocation II: Pantheon, a 2017 folk album by Eluveitie
- Evocation, a method of compressing communication into very high-level information, as described in the novel A Fire Upon the Deep by Vernor Vinge
- Evocation (band), a Swedish metal band

== See also ==
- Evoke (disambiguation)
- Invocation (disambiguation)
