= Small Chambermusicians =

Studio album by Wumpscut
- Released: December 17, 1991
- Recorded: 1991
- Genre: Industrial
- Length: 43:27
- Label: Æ
- Producer: Rudy Ratzinger

Wumpscut chronology
Defcon (1991)	Small Chambermusicians (1991)	Music for a Slaughtering Tribe (1993)

Small Chambermusicians is the second release by the German industrial music project Wumpscut.

== Summary ==
Small Chambermusicians appeared in two different editions, the only difference being that the second's cover art was changed to black and white. Many of these songs can be found on later Wumpscut compilation albums.

== Track listing ==
Side One

1. "Crucified" – 3:59
2. "Josef Zech Groove" – 4:04
3. "Move Encharge" – 2:39
4. "Stomp" – 2:19
5. "Tschüsch Domos" – 3:16
6. "Cry Weisenstein Cry" – 4:29
7. "Lamandier" – 1:37

Side Two

1. "Neolithic Heartbeat" – 4:22
2. "Tempus Fugit" – 3:03
3. "Jesus Gone" – 10:49
4. "Irak1 (A Tribute to Ernst Horn)" – 4:10
