= Boeses Junges Fleisch =

Studio album by Wumpscut
- Released: 1999
- Recorded: 1999
- Genre: EBM, electro-industrial
- Length: 55:07
- Label: Beton Kopf Media
- Producer: Rudy Ratzinger

Wumpscut chronology
Embryodead (1997)	Boeses Junges Fleisch (1999)	Wreath of Barbs (2001)

Boeses Junges Fleisch is an album recorded by the German industrial act Wumpscut. It was released in Compact Disc format on Beton Kopf Media in 1999, under the catalogue number ETAH 9.

It was first distributed in Europe by Nova Tekk, later in 2000 by Connected. It was released as a Seamless Audio Edition in 2002 and as a digipak version in 2004. Altogether, there are at least six different versions of this album (including varying artwork and track lists). For more specific information, see the External Links section of this article.

Boeses Junges Fleisch was released under the title EEvil Young Flesh [sic] – with translated titles – by Metropolis Records in North America.

The album ranked #17 on the German Alternative Charts (DAC) in 1999 and peaked at #25 on the CMJ RPM charts in the U.S. The album tracks "Totmacher" and "Ich Will Dich" ranked #42 and #46 respectively on the DAC singles charts in 1999.

== Contributing members ==
All songs on Boeses Junges Fleisch were written, performed, and produced by Rudy Ratzinger.

Additional recording by Melanie, Luckey, Turzu, Kuhlschrank, Mario, Maad and Spinnw.ebi.

Some vocals were done by Lilli Stankowski.

== Track listing ==
1. Wolf – 5:40
2. Totmacher – 4:23
3. Ich Will Dich – 6:43
4. Flucht – 4:26
5. Zerstörte Träume – 4:13
6. Hexentanz – 3:14
7. Draußen – 4:36
8. Ewig – 5:49
9. Vergib Mir – 5:43
10. Sag Es Jetzt – 5:20
11. Sehnsucht – 4:52

== Notable samples ==
In the last track Sehnsucht (Longing), from the film Legends of the Fall, the character One Stab, voiced by Gordon Tootoosis, says, "Some people hear their own inner voices with great clearness and live by what they hear. Such people become crazy. Or they become legends." The conversation between Alfred and Susannah is chopped up and sampled. Alfred: "I'm in love with you. From the first moment I saw you. Like in a novel."... "Is there any hope that you could learn to love me? " Susannah: "I don't think so."... "I can only cause you pain." The entirety of their conversation from the movie is available at imdb.
