= Urban S =

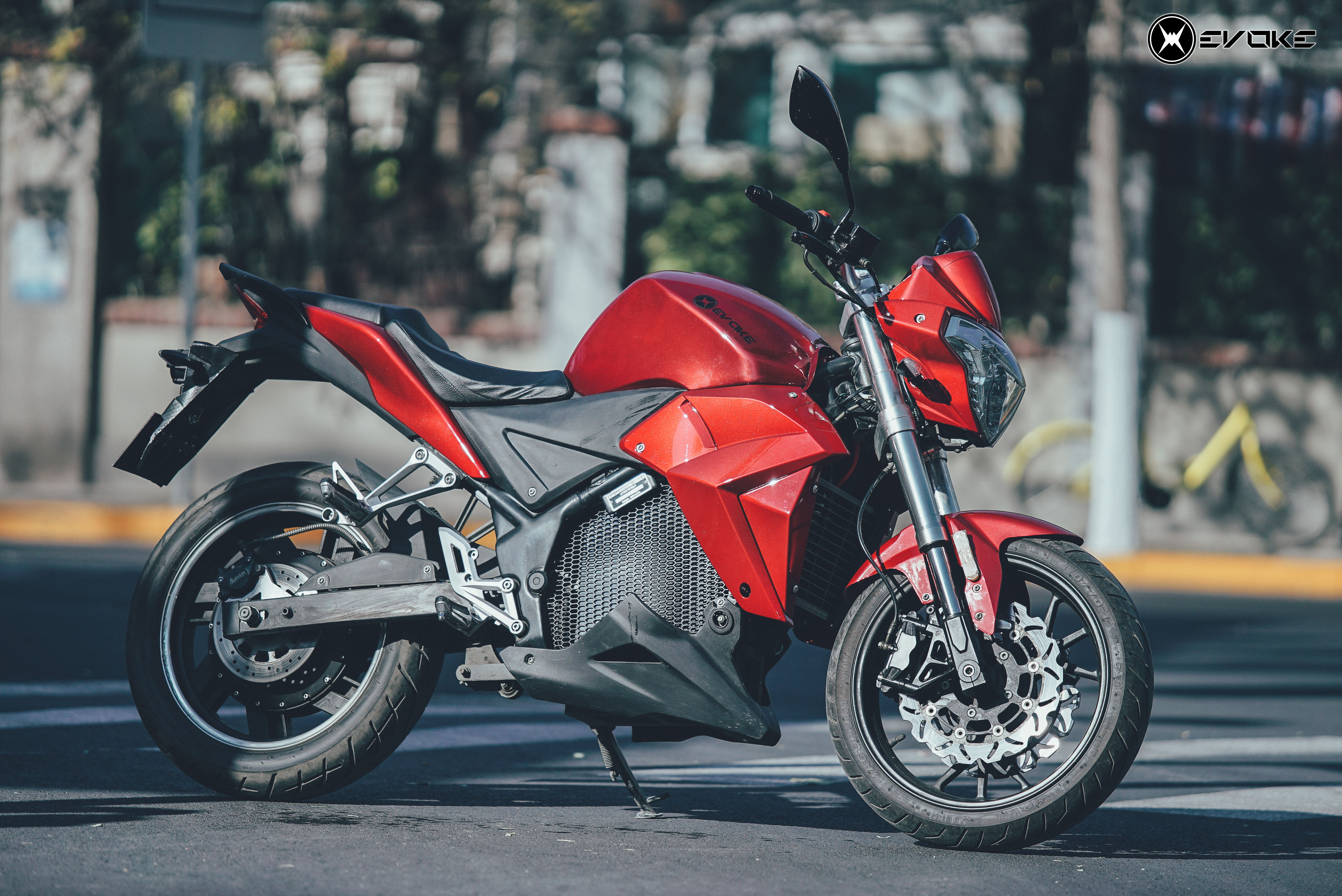
- Manufacturer: Evoke Motorcycles
- Production: 2015–present
- Class: Naked, Streetfighter
- Engine: 19 kW electric air-cooled, 17" high output hub motor, brushless
- Top speed: Sustained 80 mph (130 km/h) (claimed)
- Power: 25 hp (19 kW) (claimed)
- Torque: 86 lb⋅ft (117 N⋅m) (claimed)
- Suspension: Front suspension double 42 mm inverted fork shock absorber rear suspension single shock absorption
- Brakes: Front dual disc, 4 piston hydraulic 300 mm × 4 mm rear single disc, 2 piston hydraulic 220 mm × 4 mm
- Tires: 110/70-17 / 140/70-17
- Wheelbase: 53 in (1,300 mm)
- Seat height: 29 in (740 mm)
- Range: 125 miles (201 km)

Red Urban S

Urban S is an electric motorcycle made by Evoke Motorcycles and is Evoke's first production model to be sold worldwide

The Urban S has been on sale in China since summer 2015 and is scheduled for release in selected European countries early 2018. Due to the 100% electric drivetrain of the bike, it is exempt from the strict licensing requirements for gasoline-powered motorbikes in the larger metropolitan areas such as Shanghai and Beijing. The European version of the Urban S will have CBS in order to meet the EEC type approval legislation.

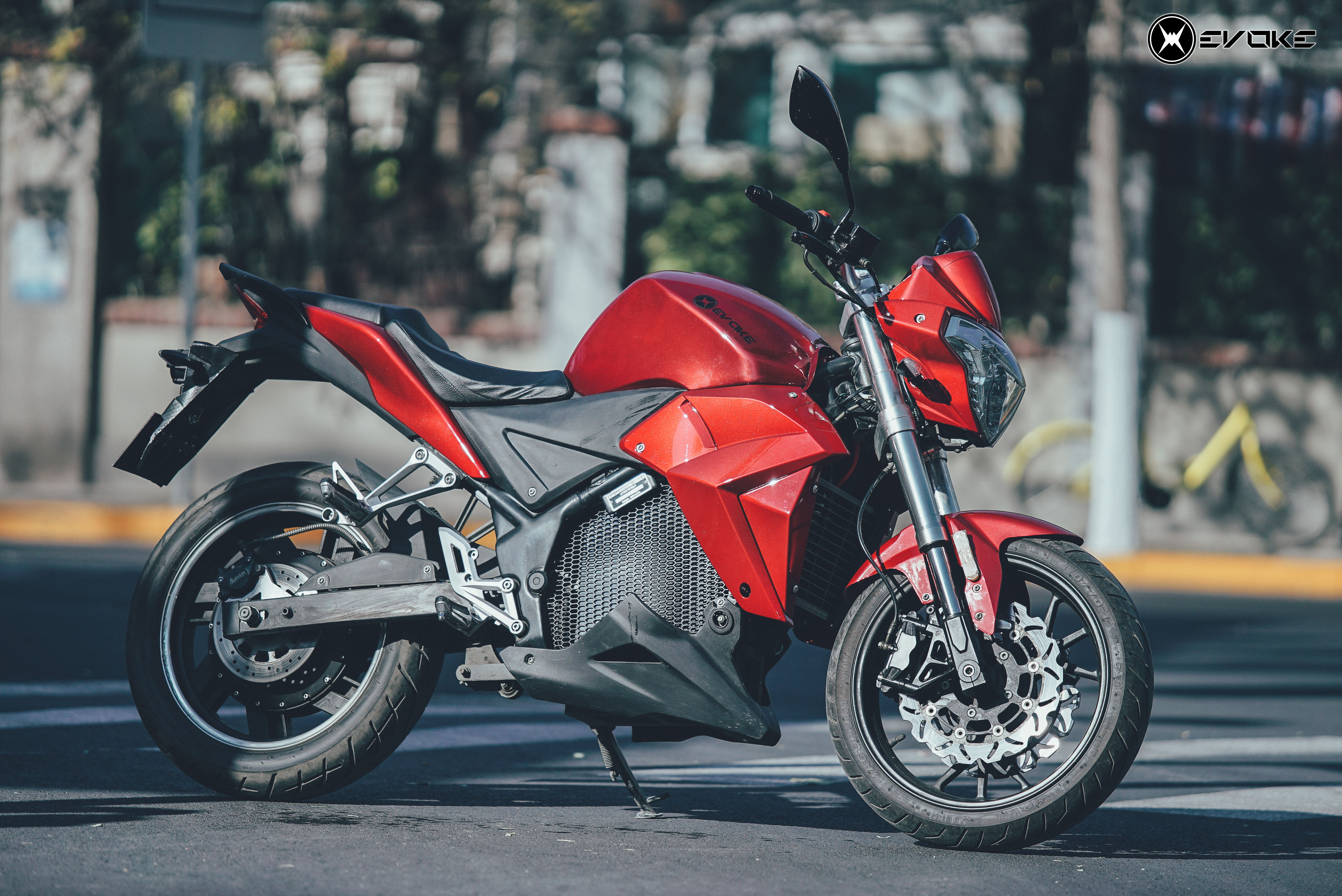
Urban S

== Battery ==
The Urban S uses a 99.2 V 90 Ah Li-on Samsung SDI battery and has a range of 125 miles (201 km) city and 75 miles (121 km) highway at 50 mpg_{‑imp} (5.6 L/100 km; 42 mpg_{‑US}). The batteries have a predicted lifespan of 125,000 miles (201,000 km) before reaching a charging capacity of 80% but can still be used after this point with a reduced range.

The Urban S can be charged fully using either 240 V for 4 hours or 120 V for 8 hours.

== Licence Class ==
The Urban S comes under the 125 cc classification in Europe so can therefore be ridden on an A1 license or a CBT in the UK

== Drivetrain ==
It uses a 400A DC wave controller with regenerative braking to increase efficiency.

The electric motor is a 19 kW 17" high output hub motor. It is air cooled and brushless. The hub design allows better cooling, a decreased chance of overheating/warping the casing and increases the life span of the unit.
