= Blondi (EP) =

EP by Wumpscut
- Released: 8 Mar 2005
- Recorded: 2005
- Genre: Electro-Industrial
- Label: Metropolis

Wumpscut chronology
Excerpts from Bloodchild (2005)	Blondi (2005)	Goth Census (2007)

Blondi is an EP written and recorded by German electro-industrial musician Wumpscut.

== Track listing ==
1. "Rush (By :W:)" - 4:29
2. "Rush (By Dismantled)" - 5:18
3. "Rush (By Naked Beat)" - 5:30
4. "Rush (By Der Blutharsch)" - 3:17
5. "Don't Go (By :W:)" - 4:07
6. "Don't Go (Eighty 64C Short Cut by :W:)" - 4:13
