= Bulwark Bazooka =

Studio album by Wumpscut
- Released: April 18, 2014
- Recorded: 2014 in Landshut
- Genre: Industrial, electro-industrial, electronic
- Length: 50:00

Bulwark Bazooka is a 2014 studio album by the German industrial music project Wumpscut.

== Track listing ==
1. "Rubber Corpse" – 4:07
2. "Furunkel Lolita" – 4:19
3. "Cross of Iron" – 5:18
4. "Atrocity Dancer" – 5:31
5. "Heresy" – 3:46
6. "Supergurl" – 4:01
7. "Vienna" – 5:32
8. "Pagan Crusade" – 5:08
9. "Flesh Trench" – 5:34
10. "RTL Hariti" – 6:58
