= Gomorra (EP) =

EP by Wumpscut
- Released: 1994
- Recorded: 1994
- Genre: Electro-Industrial
- Length: 20:17
- Label: Metropolis

Wumpscut chronology
Smell the Disgusting Sweet Taste of Dried Blood (1994)	Gomorra (1994)	Deejaydead (1997)

Gomorra is an EP written and recorded by German electro-industrial musician Wumpscut.

== Track listing ==
1. "Untermensch (Adored Version)" - 4:27
2. "In the Night (Full Range Track)" - 5:16
3. "Crucified Division (Desert Mixx)" - 3:57
4. "Turns Off Pain (Recommended Version)" - 6:04
5. "Untitled" - 0:33
