= Joseph T. Anderson =

US Marine Corps general officer and test pilot

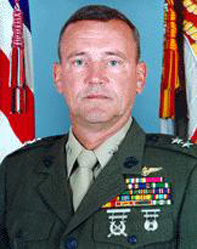
- Anderson in 1998
- Born: February 21, 1946 (age 80); Detroit, Michigan, U.S.
- Military career
- Allegiance: United States of America
- Branch: United States Marine Corps
- Service years: 1968–2001 (33 years)
- Rank: Major general
- Nickname: Joe
- Commands: VMA-331; Marine Aircraft Group 13; 1st Marine Aircraft Wing
- Conflicts: Vietnam War
- Awards: Defense Distinguished Service Medal; Navy Distinguished Service Medal; Defense Superior Service Medal; Legion of Merit
- Other work: Business executive airshow pilot

Joseph T. "Joe" Anderson (born February 21, 1946) is a retired United States Marine Corps general officer, combat veteran, and test pilot. During his military service, he made notable contributions to the Marine Corps' use of the Harrier jump jet. After retirement, he provided senior leadership to multiple organizations including the National Air and Space Museum. In 2017, Anderson retired from air show flying.

== Early life ==
Anderson was born in Detroit, Michigan, on February 21, 1946. He graduated from Detroit Catholic Central High School in 1964. He received an appointment to the United States Naval Academy in Annapolis, Maryland. After graduating in 1968 with a Bachelor of Science degree in Engineering, Anderson was commissioned a second lieutenant in the United States Marine Corps.

== Military career ==
Anderson attended The Basic School in Quantico, Virginia, and was selected to attend Undergraduate Pilot Training with the United States Air Force at Craig Air Force Base, Alabama. Upon receiving Air Force Silver Wings, he reported for duty to Marine Corps Air Station Yuma, Arizona, earning his U.S. Navy Wings of Gold and becoming combat qualified in the F-4 Phantom. He remains one of the very few pilots to be awarded both U.S. Air Force and U.S. Navy pilot wings. He served with Marine Fighter Attack Squadron 314 (VMFA-314) at Marine Corps Air Station El Toro flying the McDonnell Douglas F-4 Phantom II. In 1971, Anderson was assigned to the "Silver Eagles" of VMFA-115 where he flew combat missions in the Republics of Vietnam and Thailand. Upon return from Vietnam in 1973, he transitioned to the Hawker Siddeley Harrier (AV-8A) when he served with Marine Attack Squadrons VMA-231 and VMA-542, and also with Marine Attack Training Squadron VMAT-203.

In addition to his normal duties, Anderson earned a Master of Science degree in Systems Engineering from the University of Southern California (USC).

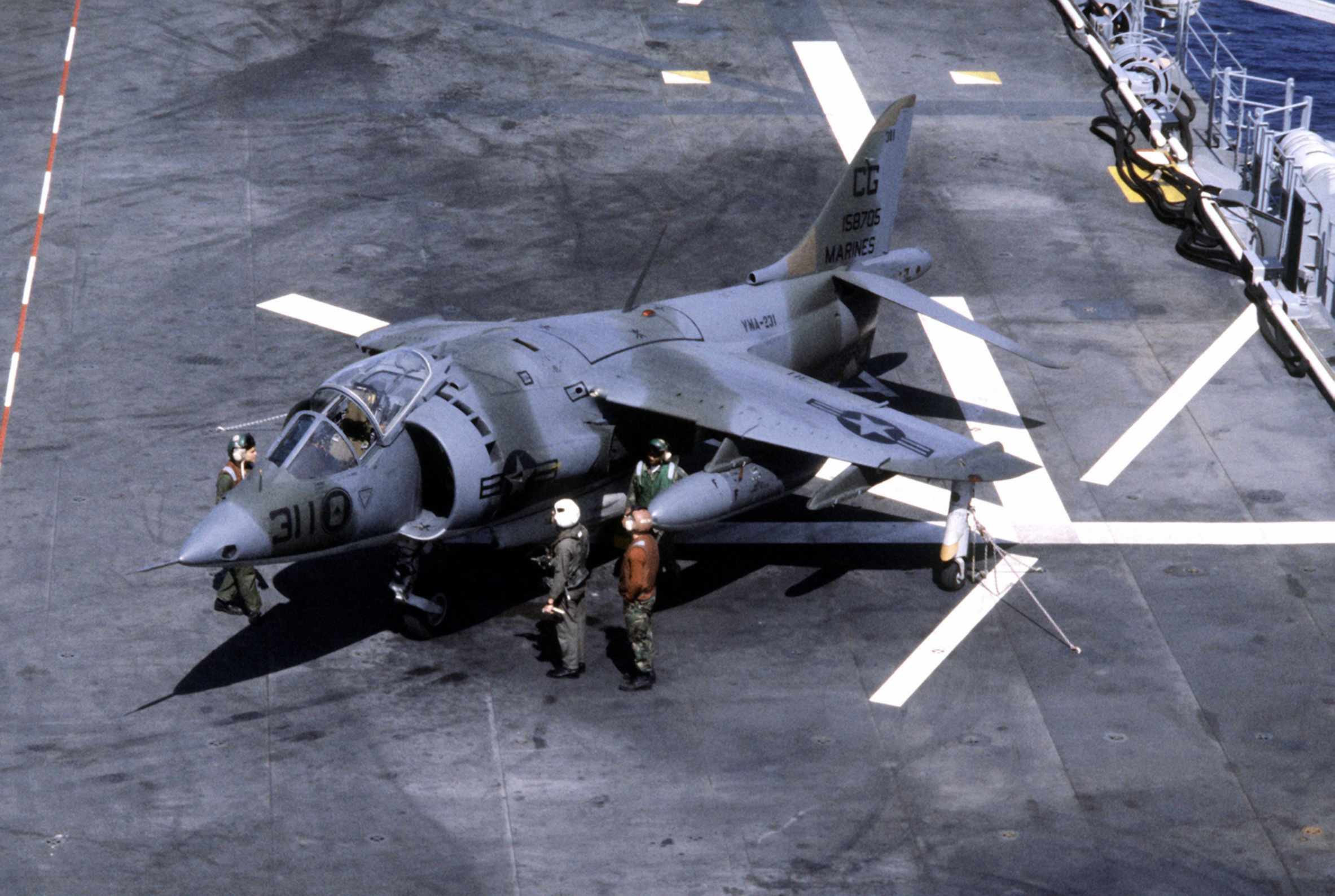
AV-8A Harrier from VMA-231 on the USS Nassau (LHA-4) in 1982

In 1975, Anderson attended the United States Naval Test Pilot School located at Naval Air Station (NAS) Patuxent River in Patuxent River, Maryland. He graduated with Class 70 and remained at NAS Patuxent River to participate in a number of test programs including development of procedures to operate the Harrier from the Landing Helicopter Assault (LHA) class of naval vessels. In 1982, Anderson implemented these procedures during a deployment to the Mediterranean with VMA-231 aboard the USS Nassau (LHA-4). He participated in the testing of the prototype YAV-8B Harrier II and supported Initial Operational Test and Evaluation (IOT&E) of the AV-8B Harrier II. Anderson served in increasingly responsible roles including executive officer of VMA-231, researcher at the Institute for Defense Analysis, and systems and engineering officer for the AV-8. In 1985, he was selected to attend the National War College at Fort Lesley J. McNair in Washington, D.C. After graduation, Anderson was assigned as the commanding officer of VMA-331 flying the McDonnell Douglas AV-8B Harrier II. In 1990, he was assigned as the commanding officer of Marine Aircraft Group 13 in Yuma, Arizona. In 1993, Anderson was selected for promotion to brigadier general and served as director of the USMC Operations Division and then as vice commander of Naval Air Systems Command.

Anderson was promoted to major general in 1997 and assigned as the Assistant Chief of Staff for Command, Control, Communications, Computer and Intelligence (C4I) and Director of Marine Corps Intelligence. In April 1998, he assumed command of the 1st Marine Aircraft Wing in Okinawa, Japan. After 33 years of service and 219 combat missions, Anderson retired from the U.S. military in 2001.

== Civilian career ==
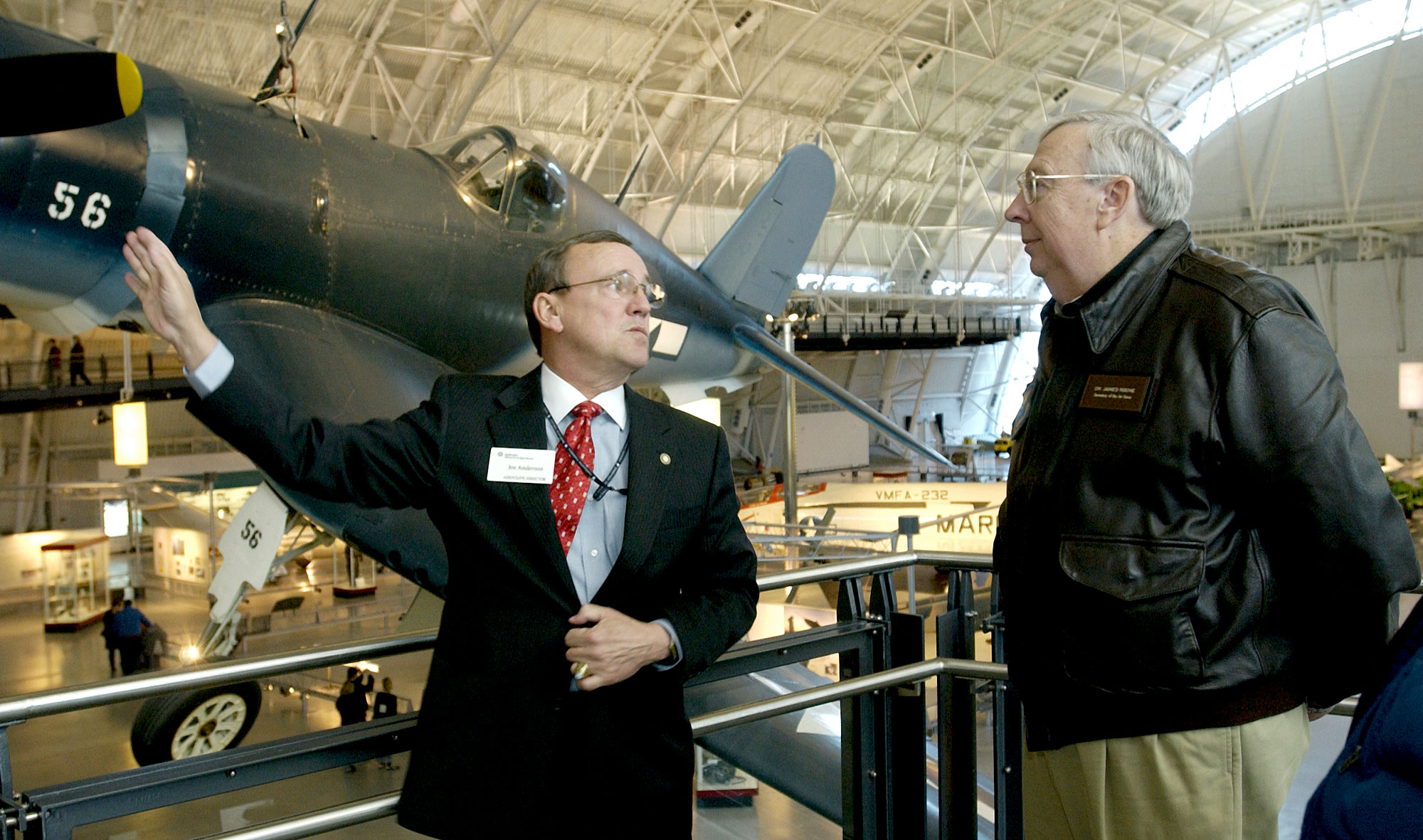
Joe Anderson (left) explains future growth plans for the National Air and Space Museum to Air Force Secretary James Roche

After retiring from the Marine Corps, Anderson started a second career as a senior executive for aerospace corporations including vice president for business development at Advanced Navigation and Positioning Corp and corporate vice president of the Dalcorp Advisory Group. In 2003, he accepted the position of associate director at the National Air and Space Museum's Steven F. Udvar-Hazy Center annex near Chantilly, Virginia. In 2006, Anderson founded an outreach program known as NASM on the Road that provided convalescing soldiers from local military hospitals with a visit to the museum. A laptop provided a virtual tour of the museum to service members who were unable to leave the hospital. In 2007, Anderson was promoted to deputy director of the facility and served in that position until his departure from the museum in 2009. Anderson also held positions on the boards of directors for a number of organizations including the Navy Federal Credit Union, Peduzzi Associates Ltd., Draken International, and the National Museum of the United States Air Force.

Anderson has remained active in community service. In 2004, he spoke at the Turning Goals Into Reality (TGIR) Awards Ceremony that celebrated the year's most significant accomplishments for the National Aeronautics and Space Administration. In 2008, he appeared in the movie, America's Marine Aviators, where he spoke on the importance of close air support and the value of the F-35 Lightning II to the Marine Corps. In 2014, he presented a lecture on effective leadership to the university and community of Findley, Ohio. Anderson is also a volunteer pilot for Angel Flight Patient Airlift Services and volunteers as a Court Appointed Special Advocate (CASA) for neglected and abused children.

=== Air show pilot ===
Any Marine aviator will tell you that, primarily, our job is to protect the guys who win the wars. Those are the people on the ground.

— Joe Anderson, America's Marine Aviators

In 2008, Anderson joined the team of fellow retired Marine aviator, Art Nalls, that restored a civilian-owned Sea Harrier to flying status. The two have flown both the Harrier and a Czech Aero Vodochody L-39 Albatros jet trainer in air shows along the eastern United States. The group is in the process of adding a two-seat trainer Harrier and additional pilots to their fleet. In 2017, after nearly a decade of flying, Anderson retired from the air show circuit.

=== Flag Officers 4 America ===
In 2021, Anderson signed an open letter from the group Flag Officers 4 America that identified perceived risks to America's constitutional republic caused by socialism, Marxism, and other factors. Some critics viewed this letter as a partisan attack on the 2020 election process and the President's health.

== Personal life ==
Anderson and his wife, Marcia, reside in Virginia and have two daughters—Amy Iler and Jane Burns. He is a member of a number of professional and military organizations including the Marine Corps Aviation Association, the Early and Pioneer Naval Aviation Association (Golden Eagles), and the Society of Experimental Test Pilots.

== Awards and decorations ==
Anderson was awarded the following decorations for his military service.

Insignia	Naval Aviator insignia			
Row 1	Defense Distinguished Service Medal		Navy Distinguished Service Medal	
Row 2	Defense Superior Service Medal	Legion of Merit	Meritorious Service Medal	Air Medal w/ valor device and Strike/Flight numeral "13"
Row 3	Navy and Marine Corps Commendation Medal	Navy Unit Commendation	Navy Meritorious Unit Commendation	Air Force Outstanding Unit Award
Row 4	National Defense Service Medal	Armed Forces Expeditionary Medal	Vietnam Service Medal w/ 1 service star	Navy Sea Service Deployment Ribbon
Row 5	Vietnam Gallantry Cross with gold star	Vietnam Gallantry Cross Unit Citation	Vietnam Civil Actions Medal Unit Citation	Vietnam Campaign Medal
Badge	Rifle Expert badge (13 awards)		Pistol Expert badge (16 awards)	

== See also ==
- List of 1st Marine Aircraft Wing Commanders
- List of historic United States Marines
- List of United States Marines
