= Defcon (album) =

Studio album by Wumpscut
- Released: October 1, 1991 (Örli Wörks); January 28, 1992 (2nd Edition)
- Recorded: 1991
- Genre: Industrial
- Length: 83:36 (Örli Wörks); 35:58 (2nd Edition)
- Label: Æ
- Producer: Rudy Ratzinger

Wumpscut chronology
Defcon (1991)	Small Chambermusicians (1991)

Defcon, also known as Örli Wörks (Early Works), is the first release by the German industrial music project Wumpscut.

== Summary ==
Defcon appeared in two different editions, with two completely different track lists. Most of the songs that originally appeared on this release were released later on the Wumpscut compilations, The Mesner Tracks, Preferential Legacy, Blutkind, and Preferential Tribe. Both editions of this tape are extremely limited to 50 copies.

== Track listing ==
Defcon (Örli Wörks)

Side one

1. "Ceremony" – 3:46
2. "Throbber Stalk" – 4:17
3. "Total Recall" – 4:18
4. "Rolclinn" – 2:32
5. "Yqually" (also known as "Equal Eye") – 4:18
6. "Phase Shifter" – 3:39
7. "Skelletton Wals" – 3:05
8. "Move Encharge" – 2:34
9. "Oyranor" – 2:08
10. "Lindberg" – 2:34
11. "Sabbath" (aka "Slovaquian Hell") – 4:44
12. "The Hellion" – 4:03

Side two

1. "Nurse Comm" – 3:17
2. "Eternal" (aka "To the Sky") – 4:47
3. "War Combattery" – 4:06
4. "Pornography" – 4:20
5. "Flangegod" – 4:20
6. "Distortion" (aka "Running Killer") – 4:08
7. "Tribute" – 3:46
8. "Default Rem." – 6:21
9. "The Devil (Tschüsch Origin)" – 3:20
10. "Tschüsch Domos (Hürryet)" – 3:13

Defcon (second edition)

Side one

1. "The Hellion" – 4:00
2. "Phase Shifter" – 3:42
3. "Throbberstalk" – 4:18
4. "Ceremony" – 4:00
5. "Lindbergh" – 2:41

Side two

1. "War Combattery" – 4:10
2. "Batavion" – 3:24
3. "Pornography" – 4:24
4. "Default" – 5:19
