= The Invoking =

- Film poster
- Directed by: Jeremy Berg
- Screenplay by: Jeremy Berg; John Portanova
- Story by: Matt Medische; Jeremy Berg
- Produced by: Matt Medische; John Portanova; Jeremy Berg
- Starring: Trin Miller; Brandon Anthony; Andi Norris; Josh Truax; D'Angelo Midili
- Edited by: Autumn Lisa Mason
- Production companies: Ruthless Pictures; October People
- Distributed by: Image Entertainment
- Release date: March 16, 2013 (SVFF)
- Running time: 79 minutes
- Country: United States
- Language: English

The Invoking, also known as Sader Ridge, is a 2013 American psychological thriller film directed by Jeremy Berg. It stars Trin Miller, Brandon Anthony, Andi Norris, Josh Truax, and D'Angelo Midili. After premiering at the Sun Valley Film Festival in March 2013, Image Entertainment released it on DVD in the US in February 2014.

== Plot ==
Samantha inherits a rural house in Sader Ridge, from an estranged aunt. She invites her friends Mark, Caitlin and Roman to join her at Sader Ridge where Eric, a young army vet and neighbor to Sam’s aunt, meets them and shows Sam the property. Eric joins them on their first night at Sader Ridge where he tells Sam she was born there and lived for her first five years at Sader Ridge, something Sam has no memory of. He also tells her that her aunt died in the house.

The next day, Sam, Caitlin, Mark and Roman explore the Sader Ridge property and surrounding area while Eric stays at the house. When the sun begins to set, Mark gets separated from the others and goes missing. Caitlin, who has a crush on Mark, urges the others to help her look for him. Eric offers to help her while Roman and Sam wait at the house. Sam falls asleep while waiting with Roman and wakes up to her car alarm going off and Roman is nowhere to be found. She goes outside to turn her alarm off and returning to the house, finds Roman on the front steps in a state of panic and screaming. Mark, Caitlin, and Eric return and Sam attempts to get their help calming Roman down only to turn around and find that Roman was never there. He emerges from the house as the others ask Sam what she was yelling about.

The next day, Mark and Caitlin go to the garage on the property and Sam mistakenly attacks Mark after she hears noises coming from inside and thinks he is assaulting Caitlin. Roman discovers that Mark and Caitlin were hooking up in the garage and becomes jealous because he likes Caitlin. Later that night, Sam is woken by yelling from the next room. She checks and finds Mark violently beating Caitlin before he turns and shoves Sam out of the room and slams the door. Sam runs to find Roman, crying hysterically, only to find Mark, Caitlin and Roman all sitting casually in the living room enjoying some beers. They help Sam to bed and speculate on what they should do for her.

Early the next morning, Sam wakes up from a nightmare wherein Mark is acting like her father and sitting on her bed punishing her with cigarette burns. Eric, who was watching her while she slept, tells her about her abusive father when she brings up the nightmare. Outside her room she hears Roman and Mark arguing because Mark and Caitlin have stayed up all night drinking. Roman leaves the house angrily and drives off in their car. When he reaches the gate and is out of view from the house, Eric walks up and offers to open the gate for Roman, then pulls a hunting knife out and stabs Roman several times before walking off. Sam goes looking for Eric and finds their car instead and a bloodied Roman dying in front of the car. Sam continues into the woods searching for Eric, while Roman grabs a knife and finishes himself off by stabbing himself in the gut.

Mark and Caitlin are attacked by Eric who cuts Caitlin’s throat, then runs into the woods. Sam returns to the house and finds Mark standing over Caitlin’s body and stabs him, thinking he’s killed Caitlin. Eric emerges and consoles Sam as she breaks down. Some time later, an officer stops at the house and Eric answers the door. The officer asks if he has seen any of four missing college students: Mark, Caitlin, Roman, or Sam. He denies having seen any of them and goes back inside the house where Sam greets him and asks who was at the door. Eric dismisses it and they kiss.

== Cast ==
- Trin Miller as Samantha
  - Carson Holden as Young Sam
- Brandon Anthony as Mark
- D'Angelo Midili as Eric
- Andi Norris as Caitlin
- Josh Truax as Roman
- Rafael Siegel as Officer Bindara

== Release ==
The Invoking premiered at the Sun Valley Film Festival in March 2013. Image Entertainment released it on DVD in the US on February 18, 2014, and in the UK on May 12, 2014.

== Sequels ==
In 2015, a sequel titled "The Invoking 2" was released straight to video. In 2016 a second sequel "The Invoking 3: Paranormal Dimensions" was released, made to capitalize off of Paranormal Activity: The Ghost Dimension and a third sequel titled "The Invoking 4: Halloween Nights" released direct to video the following year. Finally in 2018, a fourth sequel titled "The Invoking 5: Phantoms" was released.

== Reception ==
Paul Mount of Starburst rated it 5/10 stars and criticized the renaming of the film to what he said indicated a traditional horror film. Instead, he called it "an interesting idea and a decent character study" that works off of horror cliches, though it is flawed. Chris Alexander of Fangoria rated it 4/5 stars and called it a "slow, scary, ambiguous descent into the darkest part of the human psyche". Mark L. Miller of Ain't It Cool News wrote the film is slow-paced – perhaps too slow for some viewers – but pays off at the end. Patrick Cooper of Bloody Disgusting rated it 2.5/5 stars and wrote that the film is suspenseful and lacks cliches, but the acting outside of Midili and Miller is too raw. Ben Bussey of Brutal as Hell called it a "painfully dry and full" film in which nothing interesting happens during the entire runtime.
