= Art Nalls =

American test pilot (born 1954)

Arthur L. Nalls, Jr.
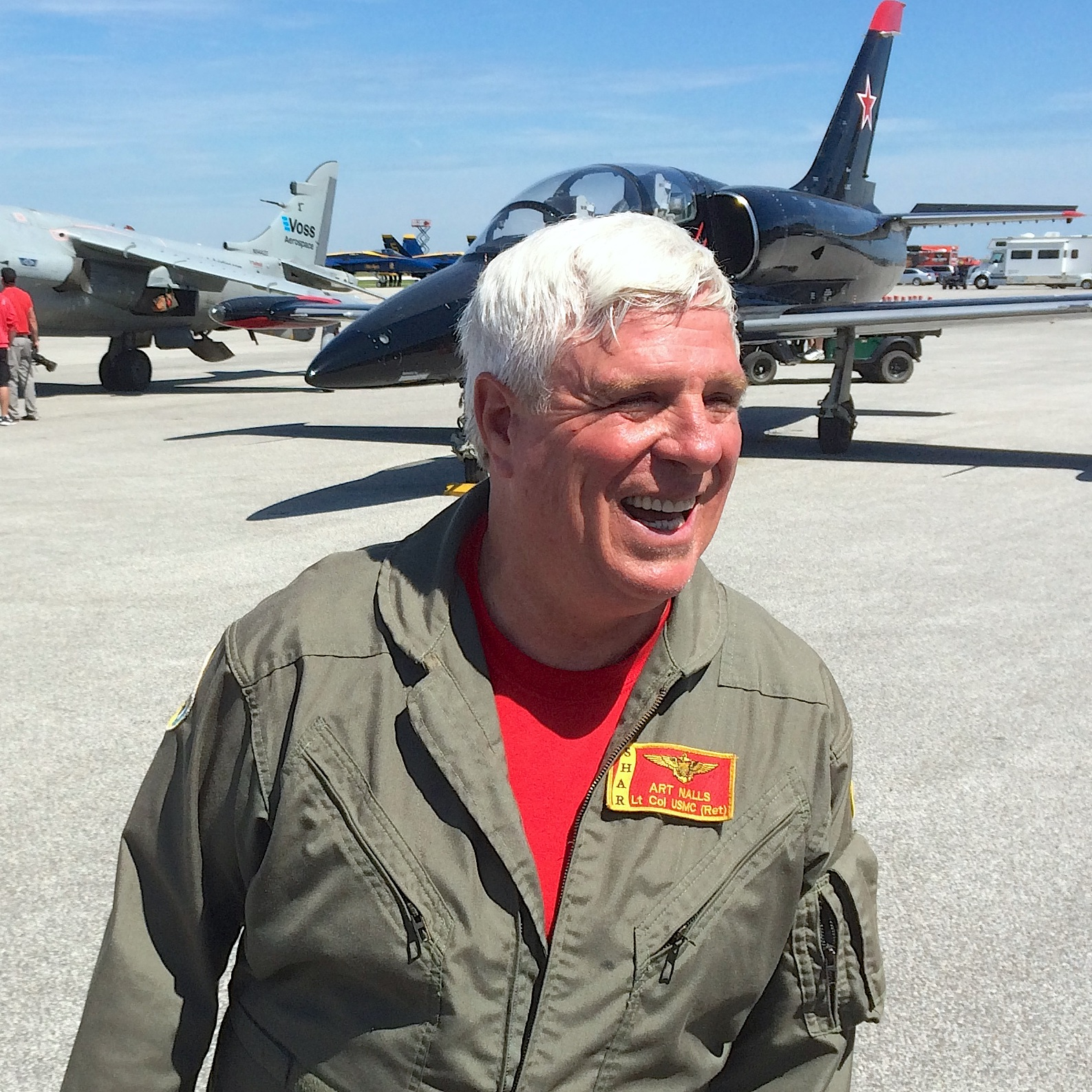
- Art Nalls at the Cleveland National Air Show in 2014
- Born: February 17, 1954 (age 72); Fairfax County, Virginia
- Military career
- Allegiance: United States of America
- Branch: United States Marine Corps
- Service years: 1976–1998 (22 years)
- Rank: Lieutenant Colonel
- Nickname: "Kaos"
- Unit: VMA-231
- Conflicts: Cold War
- Awards: Air Medal
- Other work: Real estate, air show pilot
- Website: artnalls.com

Arthur L. Nalls, Jr. (born February 17, 1954) is an American test pilot, entrepreneur and former United States Marine Corps officer, who owns and operates a unique air show business consisting of two Harrier jump jets. A former Guinness World Record holder for the World's Smallest Rideable Bicycle (1974), Nalls is notable for his contributions to the air show profession pioneering, restoring and flying uncommon aircraft. Nalls flew Harriers extensively in the military and developed a great enthusiasm for this jet capable of vertical/short takeoff and landing (V/STOL) operations. Supported by a group of pilots and maintainers, Nalls performs at air shows in the northeast United States and Canada.

According to Nalls, his Sea Harrier XZ439 is the world's first privately owned and flown Harrier of any kind. In 2014, he acquired a two-seat Harrier that is the world's only flyable civilian Harrier trainer aircraft. In 2020, Nalls decided to sell the Harriers and focus on other aviation opportunities including the SMART-1 microjets acquired in 2018 with the purchase of Aerial Productions International.

== Early life ==
Art Nalls was born in 1954 in Alexandria, Virginia, just outside Washington, D.C., and grew up in that area. He graduated from Hayfield High School in Alexandria, Virginia, in 1972 and attended the United States Naval Academy in Annapolis, Maryland. Nalls graduated "With Merit" with a Bachelor of Science degree in Aerospace Engineering.

== Military career ==
At the Naval Academy, Nalls chose aerospace engineering as his major field of study. His unconventional methods and eccentric interests were presented as key personal characteristics in articles from The Washington Post and Flightglobal. While still at the academy, Nalls built and rode the world's smallest rideable bicycle standing less than five inches tall as certified by Guinness World Records.

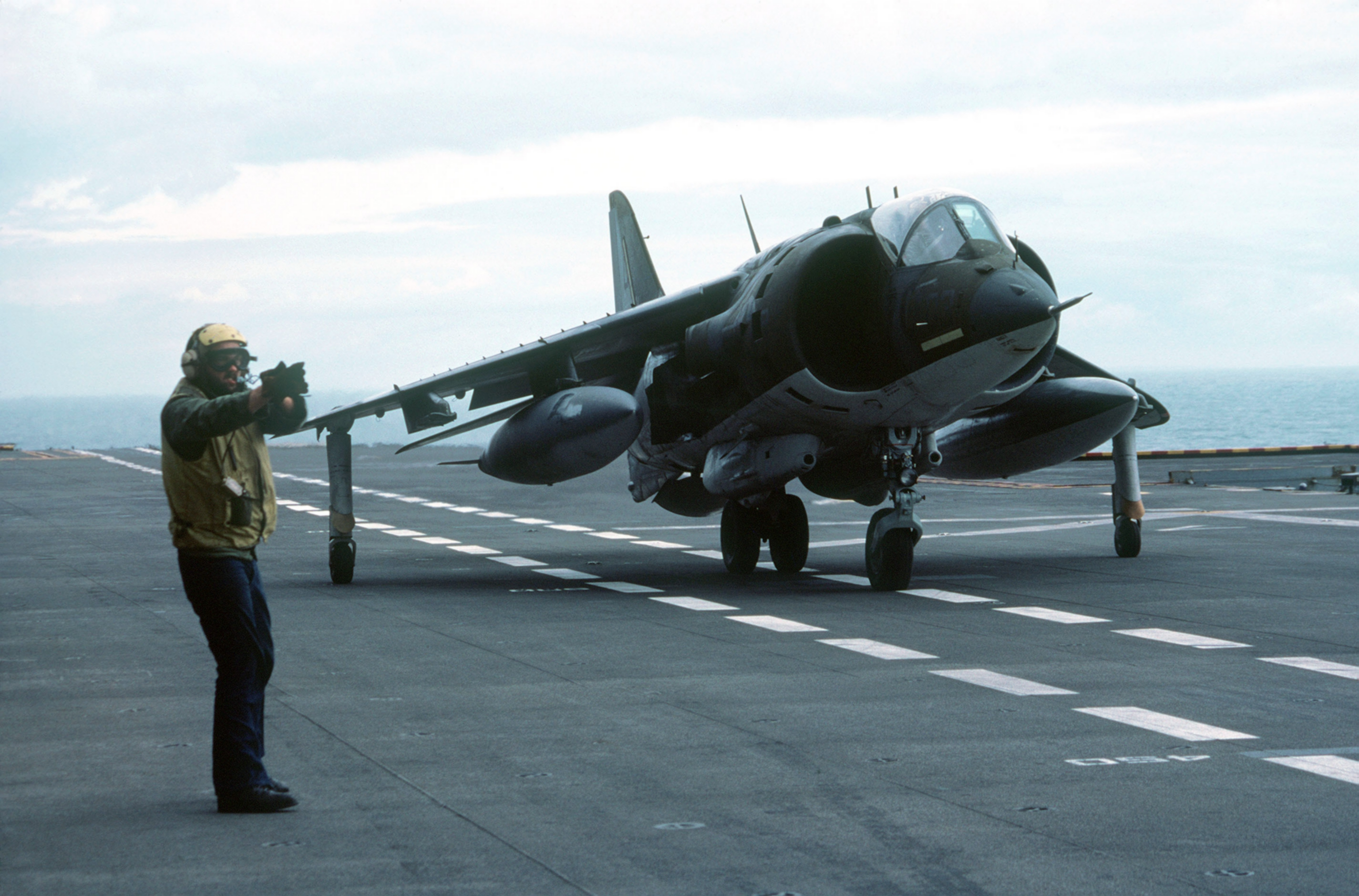
AV-8A Harrier of Marine Attack Squadron VMA-231 on the amphibious assault ship USS Nassau (LHA-4) in 1982

In 1982, Nalls participated in Northern Wedding, a NATO Cold War naval military exercise, designed to test NATO's ability to rearm and resupply Europe during times of war. He flew one of eleven AV-8A Harriers from North Carolina to the USS Nassau (LHA-4) located in the North Sea. Nalls, then a captain, was interviewed stating, "We made the trans-Atlantic crossing to demonstrate our rapid deployment capabilities. We showed we could make the transit, land on a Navy amphibious platform and be ready on arrival to provide close-air support."

On April 29, 1983, during a training flight near Richmond, Virginia, Nalls's Harrier suffered a complete loss of engine power. Since the engine failure occurred at sufficient altitude, he opted to glide the Harrier to a civilian airport and perform a deadstick landing, stopping just 50 feet (15 meters) short of the runway's end. Nalls was awarded the Air Medal for this first-of-a-kind Harrier landing.

Nalls attended the U.S. Air Force Test Pilot School at Edwards Air Force Base in southern California having been selected for the one Marine Corps slot for that year. After graduating with class 85A, he was assigned to Naval Air Station Patuxent River, Maryland as project test pilot for several Harrier programs including the AV-8B Harrier II. Nalls performed the initial shipboard certification and flight tests on the Italian aircraft carrier Giuseppe Garibaldi and the Spanish aircraft carrier Príncipe de Asturias including the first ski-jump takeoffs in the AV-8B. While leading flight test efforts for several single-engine airstart projects, he accumulated over six hours of flight time in single-engine jet aircraft without the engine running. Nalls retired from the Marine Corps in 1998 with the rank of lieutenant colonel and 22 years of service.

== Civilian career ==
After retiring from the military, Nalls formed a company to acquire and improve real estate in the Maryland, Virginia, and the District of Columbia area. The company did so well that he was able to return to flying with the acquisition of a Russian Yak-3 in 2001. Nalls next purchased a Czech Aero Vodochody L-39 Albatros jet trainer. Although he enjoyed flying these aircraft, his dream was to own and fly his favorite—the Harrier.

=== Team SHAR ===
The next aircraft in Nalls fleet would be a Sea Harrier, a dedicated naval variant first announced by the Royal Navy in 1975. The Sea Harrier FRS1 entered service in April 1980 and became commonly known as the "Shar." The acronym "FRS1" referred to the functions of fighter, reconnaissance, and strike to be performed by the first group of Sea Harriers. In 1994, BAE Systems delivered the first "FRS2" model with improvements to the engine, radar, and cockpit layout. The "FRS2" nomenclature was replaced with "FA.2" to express the equal importance of fighter and attack missions. While on a trip to Britain in October 2005, Nalls purchased Sea Harrier XZ439, the second FRS1 aircraft built and the second to be converted to FRS2 configuration. He shipped the jet back to the United States where a mostly volunteer team led by mechanics Christian Vlahos and Rich Gill worked for more than two years to bring the 31-year-old plane back to flying condition. On November 10, 2007, Nalls achieved his dream when he successfully flew XZ439 at St. Mary's County Regional Airport in Maryland—a first for a non-military pilot.

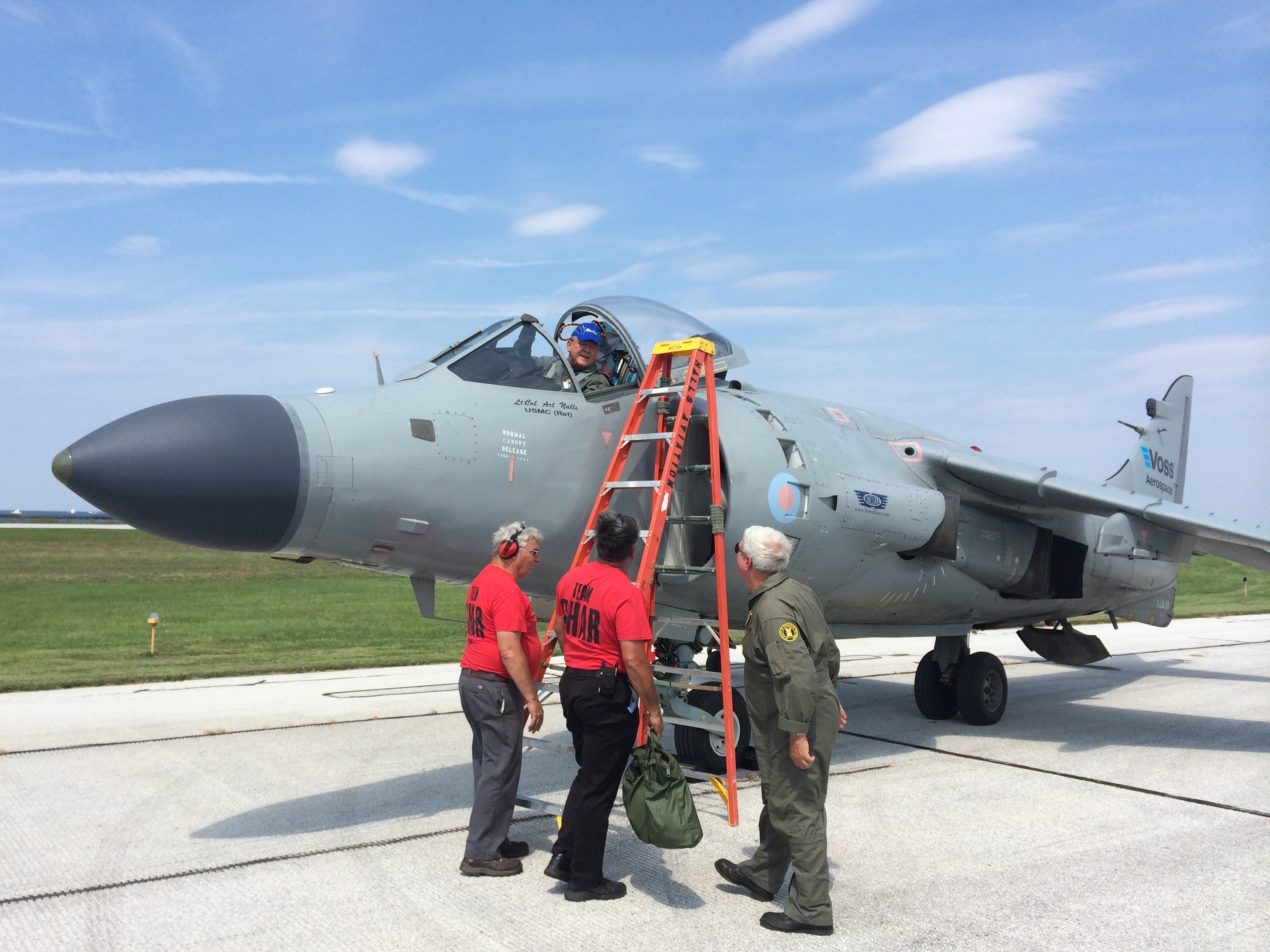
Joe Anderson prepares for his performance at the 2014 Cleveland National Air Show in Sea Harrier XZ439 with support from Rich Gill, Pete Weiskopf, and Art Nalls

The second flight on the following day was not as successful. Shortly after takeoff, a hydraulics failure prevented the landing gear from locking in place. Nalls declared an emergency and prepared to land at Naval Air Station Patuxent River. As he touched down, parts of the gear collapsed, and the jet settled hard on the landing pad. Nalls shut down the engine as base emergency services and the XZ439 ground team arrived. Uninjured, Nalls opened the canopy and joked, "These babies practically land themselves." The aircraft was removed from NAS Patuxent River, towed by a pickup truck while Nalls rode in the cockpit dressed as Santa Claus and waved to bystanders. Damage to the Harrier was minor.

The team of volunteers that operated and maintained XZ439, also known as Team SHAR, started with the following key members:

- Art Nalls, Lt. Col., USMC (ret)—owner and pilot, call sign Kaos
- Pat Hatfield-Nalls—air show coordinator, co-owner, and Nalls's wife
- Joe Anderson, MGen, USMC (ret)—pilot
- Christian Vlahos—lead mechanic
- Rich Gill—lead mechanic
- Pete Weiskopf, Senior Chief, USN, (ret)—mechanic and pilot of Nalls's L-4 Piper Cub
- Bryant Halford—mechanic

=== Air show performer ===
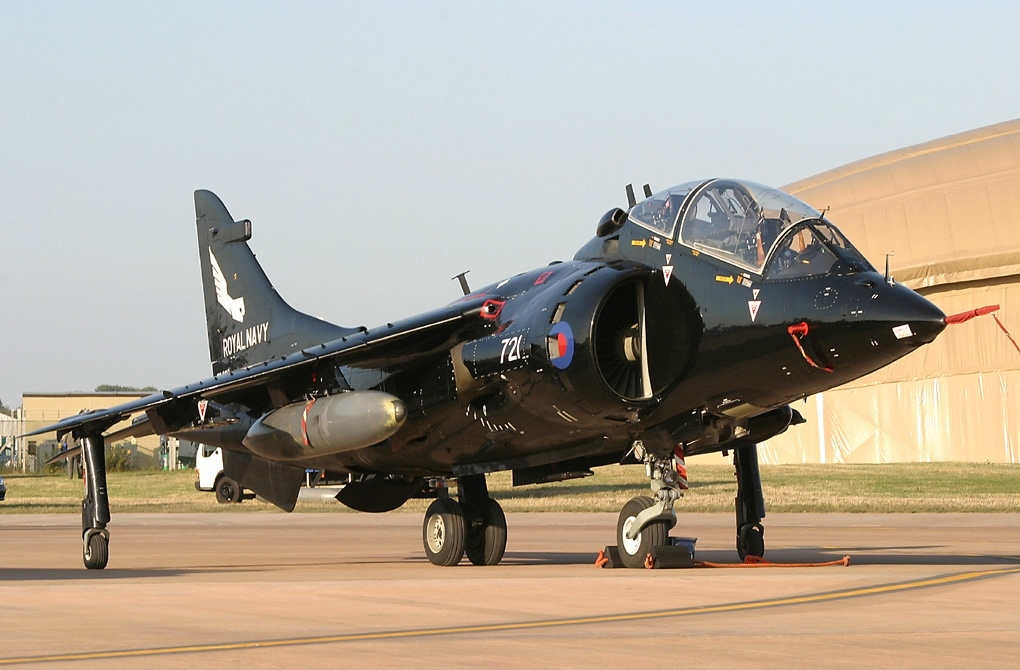
Harrier T.8 trainer similar to Nalls's ZD993

Nalls initially flew XZ439 at the 2008 Culpepper Air Fest to prove the Harrier could draw crowds and be operated at a profit despite the complex maintenance demands. The Culpepper show drew more than 4,000 spectators and established Nalls Aviation as a major air show attraction that later included venues such as the Fair Saint Louis and EAA AirVenture Oshkosh. In 2011, Nalls Aviation participated in about six air shows a year.

In 2014, Nalls acquired a second Sea Harrier, T.8 ZD993, that according to Nalls is the only flyable civilian Harrier trainer in the world. Besides providing a second aircraft for air shows, the trainer allows Nalls Aviation to safely train and certify new Harrier pilots. According to Nalls web site, several new pilots were added to the air show team in 2015: Col. Jenna Dolan USMCR, Lt. Col. Charlie VandenBossche USAF, and Major Monica Marusceac USMCR.

Nalls has also acquired a BD-5J, which is known as "The World's Smallest Jet." This particular jet is serial number BDA-01 and holds the record according to Guinness. This airplane is considerably smaller and lighter than other models of BD jets flying. Nalls has not flown this jet, due to a personal recommendation from the designer, Jim Bede to replace the engine with a newer variant of engine before flying.

In 2017, Nalls was featured in AARP Studios "Badass Pilot" series. The nine-part series, hosted on YouTube, follows Nalls and his team as they perform at air shows. The first episode aired on November 14, 2017, and described how Nalls acquired the Sea Harrier. Later episodes will provide a behind-the-scenes look at the challenges of flying and maintaining these rare aircraft.

In 2020, Nalls placed his Harrier aircraft and spare parts up for sale signaling the end of his direct participation flying the Sea Harrier at air shows. Nalls and Team SHAR have flown aerial demonstrations in the Sea Harrier since 2007.

=== SMART-1 microjet ===
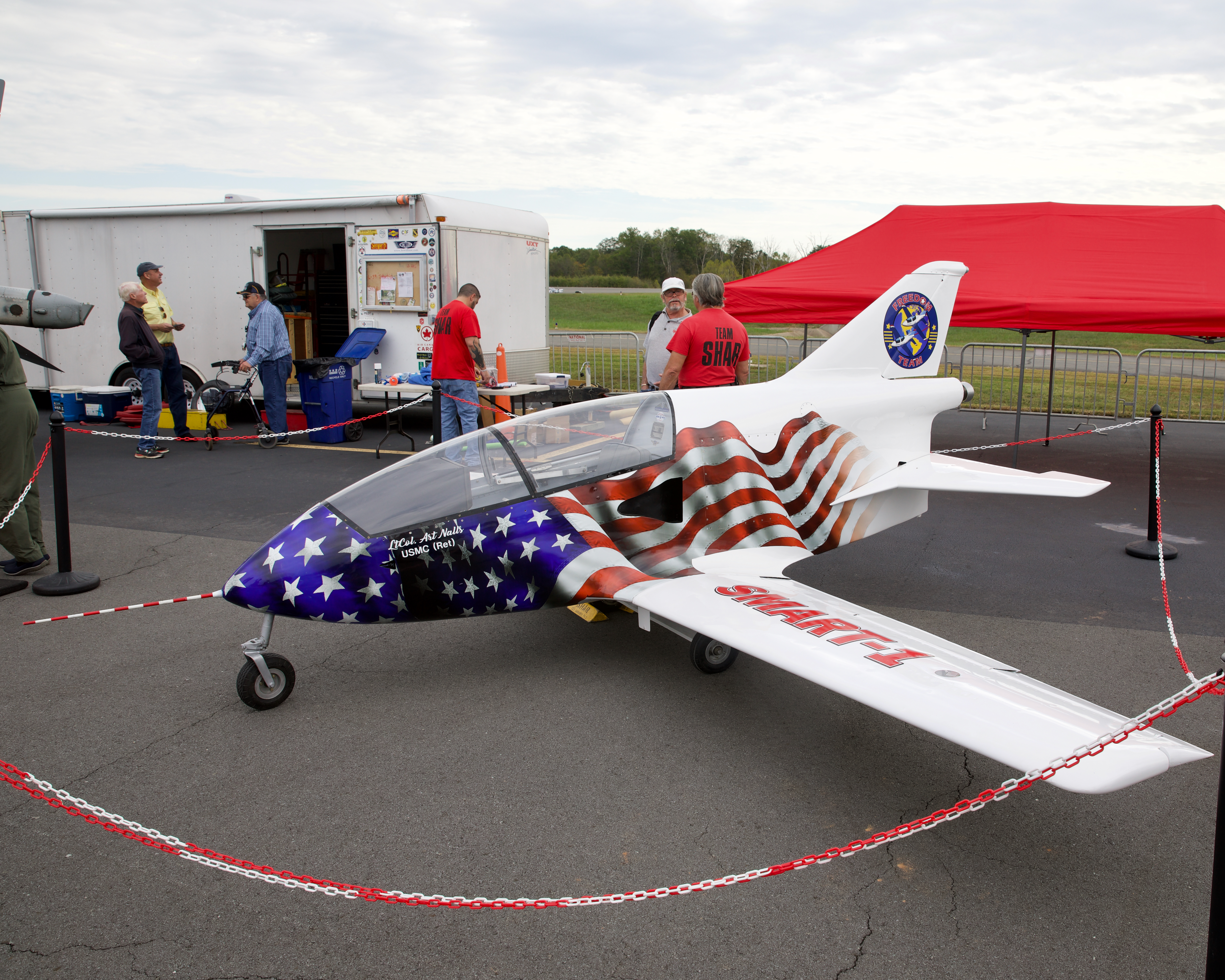
SMART-1 microjet on static display in 2019

In 2018, Nalls Aviation announced that they had acquired Aerial Productions International (API), a company that adapted the small and relatively inexpensive BD-5J microjet to simulate a cruise missile in support of United States Department of Defense (DoD) activities. Cruise missile defense has been an area of increasing importance for the DoD in order to prevent attacks such as the one that occurred at a Saudi oil facility in 2019. API modified the BD-5J from an air show performer to the Small Manned Aerial Radar Target, Model 1 (SMART-1) configuration by reducing radar cross-section and increasing top speed. In September 2019, Nalls and an API team with 6+ microjets flew to Gila Bend Municipal Airport in Arizona and successfully completed three days of airborne radar testing at a nearby US government test range. Nalls reported additional test events with the microjets are planned. In 2020, Nalls group deployed to Largo, Florida and used the microjets to help test a future ship-borne radar for the US military.

== Community activities ==
Nalls is active in the aviation community honoring veterans and sharing his experiences with groups such as the Civil Air Patrol and Young Eagles. In 2013, he was one of eight civilian pilots that performed a ceremonial flyover at Arlington National Cemetery for the burial of two Air Force pilots killed during the Vietnam War. Nalls celebrated the military service of World War II fighter ace, Rear Admiral E. L. "Whitey" Feightner, at the Cleveland National Air Show in 2014. On May 8, 2015, he participated in a flyover of the nation's capital to commemorate the 70th anniversary of the Allies of World War II Victory in Europe Day. He was in the first formation of aircraft over the National Mall, consisting of four, Liaison aircraft. They are the military version of the Piper Cub, known as the L-4 "Grasshopper."

A member of the Society of Experimental Test Pilots, Nalls co-authored two conference papers. The first was presented at the 1989 symposium and evaluated ski jump operations aboard the Príncipe de Asturias in the AV-8B Harrier. The second was presented at the 1993 symposium and evaluated the performance of Former Soviet Union V/STOL aircraft including the Yakovlev Yak-38 and Yak-141. In 2017, Nalls was inducted into the Early and Pioneer Naval Aviation Association also known as the Golden Eagles. The group was founded in 1956 to provide a living memorial to early naval aviators.

In 2020, Nalls and retired US Navy rear admiral, Scott Sanders, conceived an unusual way to support veterans organizations by selling "700 Mile Per Hour Bourbon". Bourbon whiskey supplied by Sanders' distillery will be carried in two specially modified external fuel tanks aboard Nalls' Sea Harrier and flown at high altitude and speed. The unique bourbon will then be sold and the proceeds donated to the Semper Fi & America's Fund. Delayed by the COVID-19 pandemic, the flight was not expected to occur until 2021. The flight finally took place in late August 2021 with the Harrier carrying 670 pounds of bourbon.

As of August 19, 2026, the following experimental aircraft authorizations were added to Nalls’ FAA commercial pilot certificate: DC-F4, NH-T38, NH-F5, and CE-T37. Experimental aircraft authorizations are FAA-issued approvals that allow pilots to act as pilot in command of specified aircraft.

As of 2015, Nalls and his wife, Pat, reside in Calvert County, Maryland. He has two adult sons, Arthur and Brian.

In 2023 he starred in the Derek Savage movie production "Cool Cat vs Dirty Dog" as himself, bombing the bully "Dirty Dog" with napalm.

== Honors ==
During his career, Nalls has flown approximately 75 types of aircraft, performed more than 400 launches from a carrier, and received the following honors:

- Air Medal for meritorious achievement in aerial flight on April 29, 1983, when Nalls's Harrier lost power. Nalls safely landed the unpowered aircraft on a civilian airport runway. This was the first time an engine-out landing had been performed in the Harrier
- Honored military alumnus of Hayfield High School
