= Jenna Dolan =

Aviator

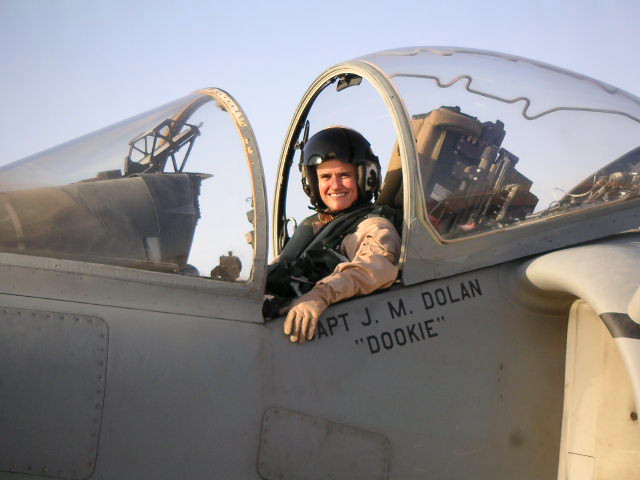
- Dolan in the cockpit of an AV-8B Harrier
- Born: 1974 (age 51–52)
- Military career
- Allegiance: United States of America
- Branch: United States Marine Corps
- Service years: 1996–2008 (active); 2009–present (reserve)
- Rank: Colonel
- Nickname: "Dookie"
- Unit: VMA-542
- Conflicts: Iraq War
- Other work: Aerospace Industry; Air show pilot

Jennifer Marie "Jenna" Dolan (born 1974) is a colonel in the United States Marine Corps Reserve and former fighter pilot. During the 2003 invasion of Iraq, she became the first woman to fly the McDonnell Douglas AV-8B Harrier II aircraft in combat. The First Lady of the United States, Michelle Obama, recognized Dolan's transition from the military to civilian workforce as an example for others to follow. Dolan plans to join a small group of civilian pilots that fly the Harrier at air shows.

== Early life ==
Dolan grew up near Saint Paul, Minnesota with three older siblings. Her father and oldest brother were both pilots in the U.S. Marine Corps. Her father served in the Vietnam war era and used to fly the Douglas A-4 Skyhawk. Dolan credits her father and brother for sparking her interest in aviation. She was active in athletics including gymnastics, waterskiing, and snow skiing. Dolan attended the Convent of the Visitation School, an independent, all-girls, Roman Catholic, college-preparatory school in Mendota Heights, Minnesota.

== Military career ==
Dolan attended the United States Naval Academy in Annapolis, Maryland and graduated in 1996 with a Bachelor of Science degree in Mathematics. As with her father and brother before her, Dolan chose the U.S. Marine Corps and was commissioned a second lieutenant. She attended The Basic School in Quantico, Virginia followed by flight training in the T-34C Turbo-Mentor at Naval Air Station (NAS) Pensacola in Florida. Dolan transitioned to jets, training in the T-2 Buckeye and the T-45 Goshawk at NAS Meridian near Meridian, Mississippi. She performed carrier qualification aboard the USS George Washington (CVN-73) and earned her wings in September 1999. She transitioned to the AV-8B Harrier at Marine Corps Air Station (MCAS) Cherry Point near Havelock, North Carolina and was assigned to the "Tigers" of VMA-542.

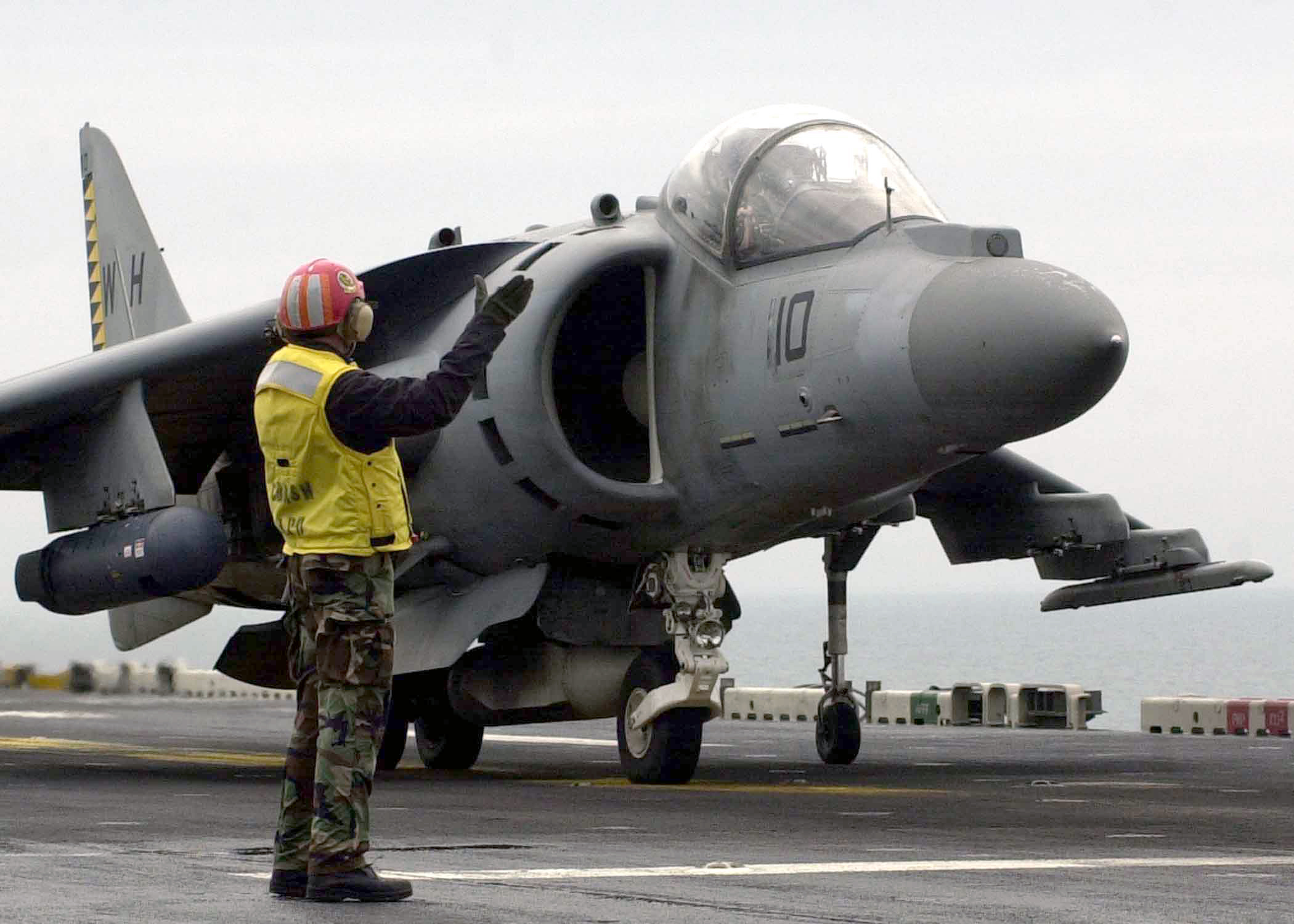
AV-8B Harrier of VMA-542 on the amphibious assault ship USS Bataan (LHD-5) in 2003

Dolan's first tour of duty took place from January to May during the 2003 invasion of Iraq. She deployed with VMA-542 aboard the USS Bataan (LHD-5)—the only woman in her squadron. Dolan became the first woman to fly the AV-8B Harrier in combat on the evening of March 19, 2003 in support of the shock and awe campaign that utilized overwhelming power and displays of force to quickly end the military effectiveness of Iraqi forces. She flew close air support missions destroying targets in designated kill boxes and protecting troops engaged with the enemy. Upon returning home, she was selected to attend the Weapons and Tactics Instructor (WTI) course at MCAS Yuma in Arizona. WTI is a prestigious seven-week course that trains marine aviators in advanced air-to-air and air-to-ground tactics in order to return them to their squadrons to train other pilots.

Dolan's second tour occurred from May to November 2004 during the Iraq War. On this deployment, VMA-542 was stationed at Al Asad Airbase in the Al Anbar Governorate. She was assigned as the weapons and tactics instructor for the squadron and led combat missions in multiple battles including Operation Phantom Fury—the Second Battle of Fallujah. Dolan returned home and served as the group's safety officer. She attended school with Training and Education Command in Quantico, Virginia but ultimately decided to leave active duty for the Marine Corps Reserve and a civilian position at General Electric. During her 12 years of active duty service, Dolan flew 121 combat missions in the AV-8B.

== Civilian career ==
In 2009, Dolan joined General Electric where she participated in a leadership program that sent former junior military officers on rotation through GE businesses. She worked as a product development program manager at GE Aviation responsible for the production and sale of helicopter engines.

In August 2012, Dolan was a host at a memorial dedication ceremony for Lieutenant Colonel Alfred A. Cunningham. Cunningham was the first Marine Corps aviator and the first Director of Marine Corps Aviation. The event was held at William L. Hammond Park in Marblehead, Massachusetts near the location where Cunningham learned to fly one hundred years prior at the Burgess Aviation Company.

Be yourself. Be comfortable in your own skin.
– Advice from Dolan on being successful in a military career

First Lady Michelle Obama and Jill Biden created the Joining Forces initiative to support military families and demonstrate the unique capabilities veterans bring to the civilian workplace. In March 2013, Obama paid tribute to Dolan's successful transition from military to civilian life at the Business Roundtable quarterly meeting. Dolan was interviewed for the 2015 book, Light It Up: The Marine Eye for Battle in the War for Iraq, where she described the attack and surveillance capabilities of the LITENING targeting pod that was used on the AV-8B Harrier. Dolan recounted her wartime experience using the pod to provide detailed imagery at high altitude, identify and designate targets using a built-in laser, and perform intelligence, surveillance and reconnaissance (ISR) missions using the pod to record video.

An opportunity to fly the Harrier again came in 2014, when Dolan began training with Nalls Aviation, a company that operates a civilian-owned Sea Harrier in air shows in the eastern United States. According to owner, Art Nalls, she completed training in both the Czech Aero Vodochody L-39 Albatros jet trainer, the Sea Harrier, and plans to fly in the 2016 air show season. During the 2016 MCAS Cherry Point air show, Dolan took members of the media for rides in an L-39 Albatros.

In 2017, Dolan was featured in AARP Studios "Badass Pilot" series. The nine-part series, hosted on YouTube, follows Art Nalls and his team as they perform at air shows. Episode 4 showed Dolan training with Nalls as she prepared for her first air show season flying the Sea Harrier. Dolan was promoted to colonel in the USMC Reserve in November 2018.

Dolan expanded her management experience by working with control system projects for two years at GE Energy Connections before returning to military engine programs including the F414 turbofan that powers the Boeing F/A-18E/F Super Hornet. As of 2020, she remains active as a civilian pilot flying the L-39 Albatros and BD-5 microjet.

== Personal life ==
Dolan is married to husband Matt with whom she has two children, Sean and Lara. As of 2016, the family lives in Marblehead, Massachusetts.

== See also ==
- List of firsts in aviation
- List of United States Marines
- Martha McSally—first female U.S. combat aviator
- Sarah Deal—first female U.S. Marine Corps aviator
- Vernice Armour—first African-American female U.S. Marine Corps aviator
