= Evoke (album) =

Studio album by Wumpscut
- Released: April 12, 2005
- Recorded: 2004 in Landshut
- Genres: Industrial, electro-industrial, electronic
- Length: 60:52

Evoke is a 2005 album by the German industrial music project Wumpscut.

== Track listing ==
1. “Maiden” – 5:14
2. “Churist Churist” – 3:46
3. “Don’t Go” – 4:30
4. “Evoke” – 5:31
5. “Tomb” – 5:31
6. “Hold” – 4:58
7. “Krolok” – 4:37
8. “Breathe” – 3:26
9. “Rush” – 4:44
10. “Perdition” – 4:40
11. “Obsessio” – 4:42
12. “Churist Churist” (Recently Deceased remix) – 4:42
13. “Maiden” (Nersoton vs :w: remix) – 4:31
