= Blondy =

Blondy may refer to:

Nickname:

- J. T. "Blondy" Black (1920–2000), professional American football player
- Gwendolyn Chisolm (1959–2026), American rapper and former member of female hip hop The Sequence
- Thomas Graydon (1881–1949), American football player
- John Romig (1898–1984), American middle-distance runner
- Blondy Ryan (1906–1959), American Major League Baseball shortstop
- Blondy Wallace (died 1937), early professional football player and later convicted criminal, associate of Nucky Johnson

Other:

- Alpha Blondy (born 1953), African reggae singer and international recording artist
- Michel Blondy (1675–1739), French choreographer and dancer

== See also ==
- Blondie (disambiguation)
