= Goth Census =

EP by Wumpscut
- Released: 2007
- Recorded: 2006
- Genre: Electro-Industrial
- Length: 20:31
- Label: Metropolis

Goth Census is an EP written and recorded by German electro-industrial musician Wumpscut.

== Track listing ==
1. "My Dear Ghoul" - 3:24
2. "We Believe, We Believe" - 3:37
3. "Udanai, My Lord (Yendri Club Mix)" - 4:35
4. "You Are a Goth (Yendri Lift-Your-Mask Remix)" - 4:44
5. "You Are a Goth (Yendri Club Remix)" - 4:11
