= Evoke Motorcycles =

Electric Vehicles Manufacturer

Evoke Electric Motorcycles (HK) Ltd.
- Industry: Vehicle, Batteries Packs, ECU, Powertrain Manufacturing
- Founded: 2014; 12 years ago
- Founders: Nathan Siy, Sebastian Chrobok
- Headquarters: Hong Kong
- Area served: Worldwide
- Products: Electric Motorcycles, Powertrain, ATVs
- Services: Product Design, Powertrain, Vehicle Design,
- Number of employees: 200
- Website: www.evokemotorcycles.com

Evoke Motorcycles (逸沃科（北京）科技有限公司) is a manufacturer of smart electric motorcycles. It was officially founded by Nathan Siy, Sebastian Chrobok and Chris Riether in 2014 in Beijing, China but have been in operation developing electric motorcycles since 2012. It currently is headquartered in the Yizhuang District, Beijing, China.

In June 2017, Evoke Motorcycles were chosen as one of the 5 most exciting products at CES Asia's Startup Park.

== Model History ==
The Urban S is an Italian inspired naked street bike (see types of motorcycles) that has a 100% electric drivetrain and a 200 km (125 mile) range. It is the first mass-produced Evoke bike available and was released in China in summer 2015 and is available in selected European countries in early 2018. When released, it will be the lowest cost, entry level electric motorcycle on the market with a $9499 MSRP. The Urban S is aimed at the new rider demographic but is also suitable for riders looking for a low maintenance environmentally friendly method of commuting.

A cafe racer style bike, the Urban Classic, was release at the EICMA Milan motorcycle expo 2017 and is now in production.

Orange Evoke Urban S

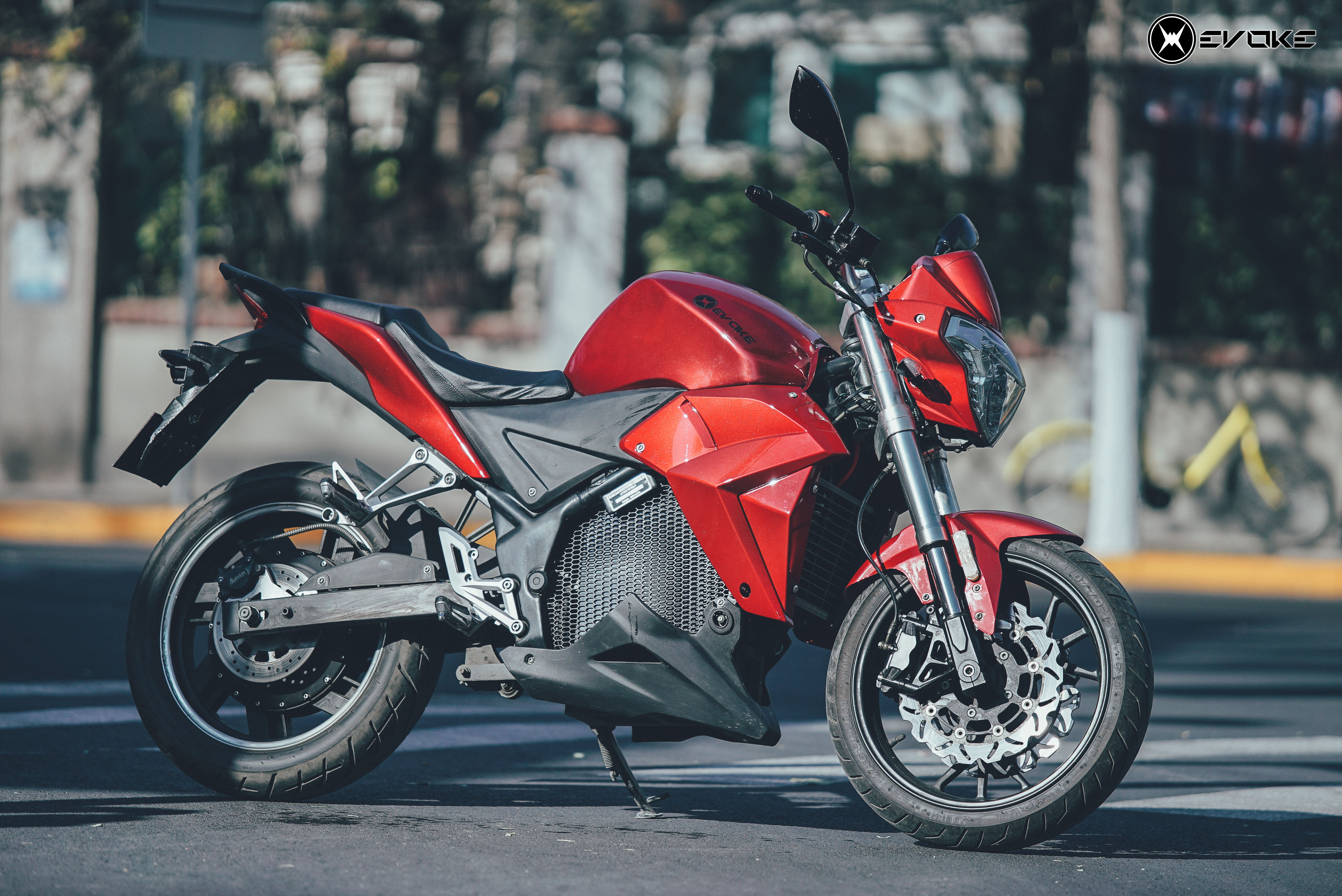
Evoke Urban S

An earlier electric bike was commissioned by the Indonesian police force in 2012 and 5 prototypes were produced.

== Future Models ==
Evoke currently has a Kruzer style bike in development, now known as the Evoke Motorcycles 6061, for a Q4 2018 release that will have more performance (120KW peak power), a longer range of around 400 km, ABS and an internally mounted water cooled motor. It will also come with a 7" touch screen as standard. There are more models scheduled for in the future but details are yet to be released.

== Production ==
In 2016, Evoke Motorcycles partnered with a division of Foxconn, to mass-produce their Urban S in Yizhuang, China. Evoke also have a deal with the SDI division of Samsung to supply battery cells. The Urban S is available to preorder as of 2017.

There are currently distributors for China and Turkey. Other distributors in other countries stopped to work with Evoke Motorcycles. The situation is unclear for now.

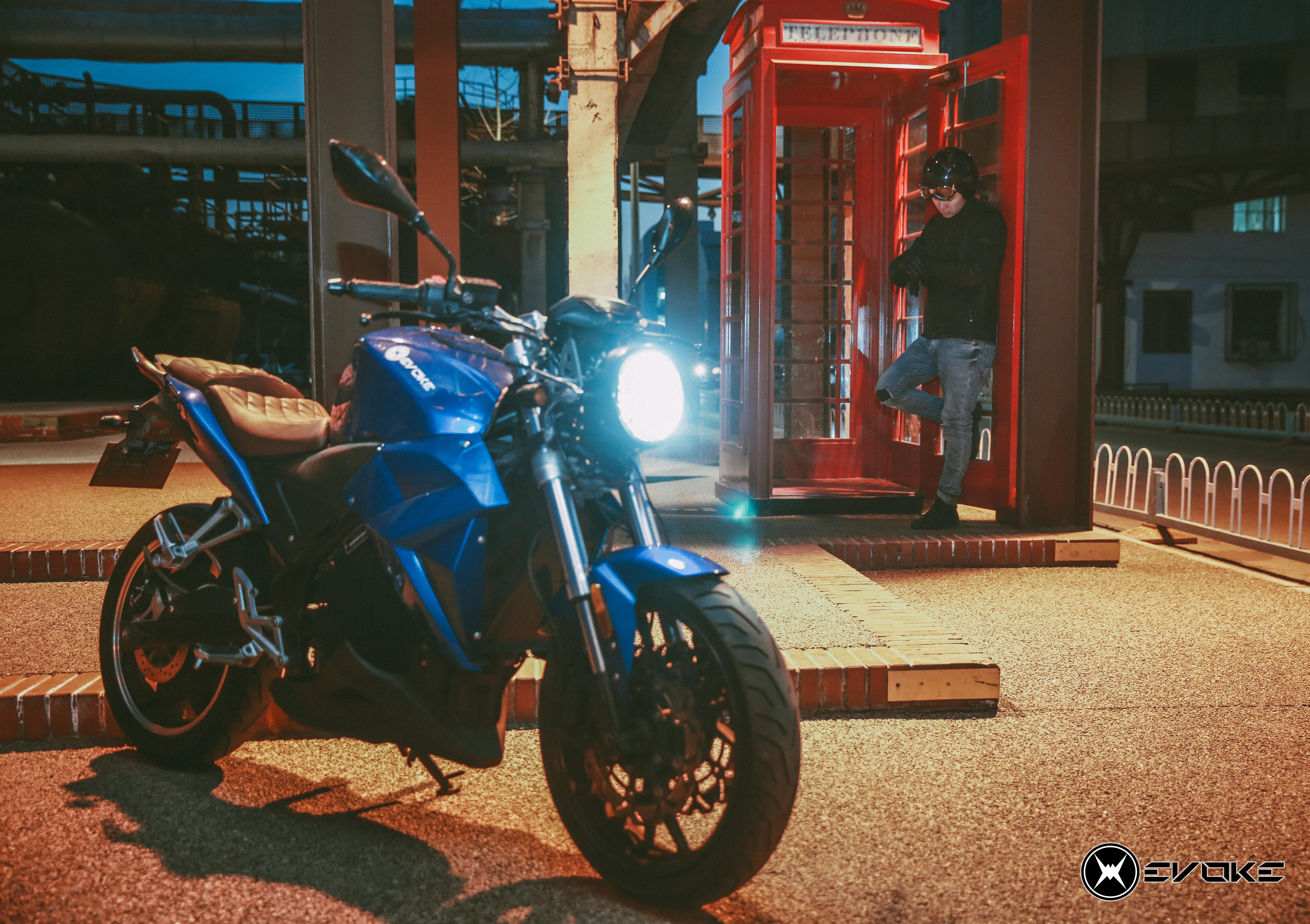
Evoke Urban Classic

== MyEvoke ==
MyEvoke was a concept of riding a motorcycle without buying one, but the concept was abandoned. The user would pay an initial deposit for an Urban S then a monthly subscription. When the rider is running low on battery charge, they ride the bike to a swap station and swap the bike for a fresh one. This removes the hassle of charging, maintaining and insuring a motorcycle. The MyEvoke service will initially be released in Beijing then expand to other cities across China and Europe.
