= Invoke Solutions =

Invoke
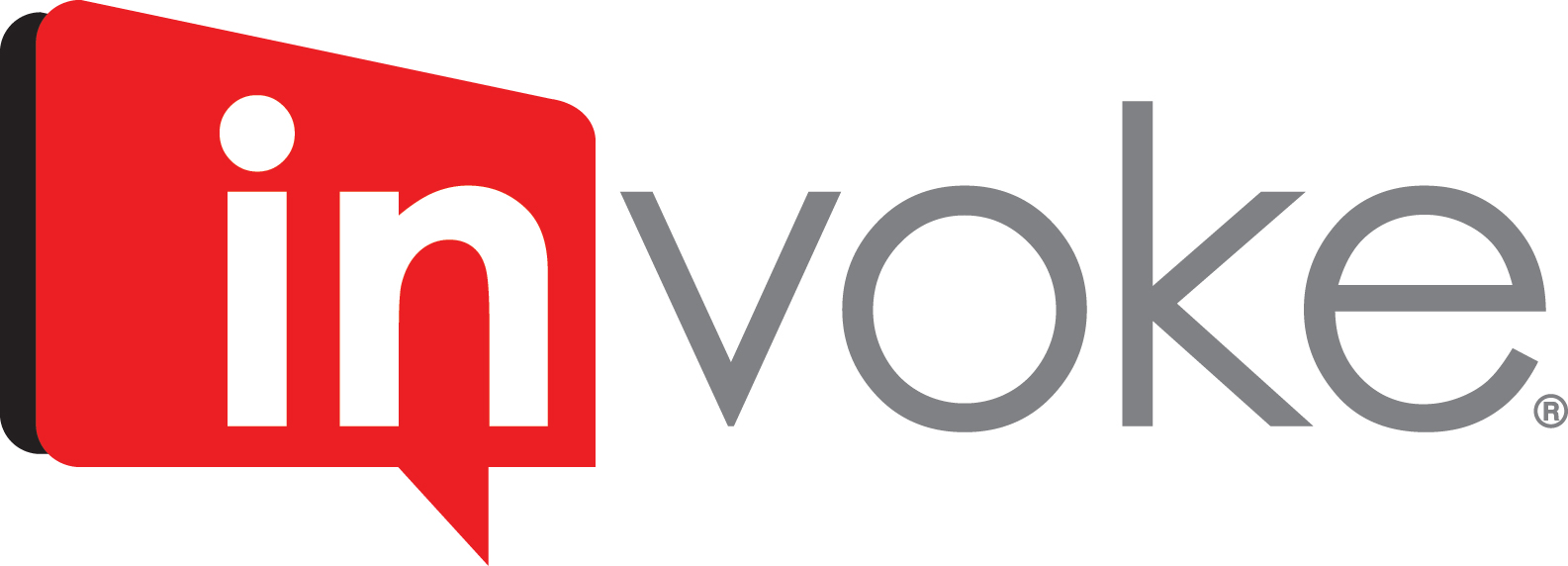
- Industry: Technology for market research
- Headquarters: Boston, United States

Invoke is an American market research company.

The company is headquartered in the Boston area with offices in Los Angeles and metropolitan New York.

== Market Research in the United States ==
By 2005 the company was headquartered in Massachusetts and marketed online as a hybrid qualitative-quantitative research approach under the name Invoke LIVE. The ability to capture metrics while conducting discussion-based interviews at a large scale combines elements of focus groups, in-depth interviews, and online surveys into something completely different than any of the methods alone.

In 2010, eBay and Invoke were finalists at the IIR Explor Awards for research to provide feedback on eBay's Buyers and Sellers feedback system.

Since 2017, Invoke has been focused on providing virtual market research services to companies in the media and entertainment industry.
