= Arnold Walker (RAF officer) =

- Born: Arnold Edgar Walker; 4 April 1917; Halifax, West Yorkshire
- Died: 9 November 2008 (aged 91); Perth, Western Australia
- Military career
- Allegiance: United Kingdom
- Branch: Royal Air Force
- Service years: 1939–1946
- Rank: Flight Lieutenant
- Nickname: Blondie
- Units: No. 94 Squadron, No. 6 Squadron
- Conflicts: World War II: North African Campaign; Italian Campaign
- Awards: Distinguished Flying Cross & Bar
- Other work: Construction, Local councillor

Arnold Edgar "Blondie" Walker DFC & Bar (4 April 1917 – 9 November 2008) was a British fighter pilot during World War II who flew 169 sorties, was shot down three times, and was awarded the Distinguished Flying Cross twice.

== Early life ==
Born in Warley Edge, Halifax, West Yorkshire, the son of a stonemason and builder, and youngest of three children, Walker (always known as 'Blondie') was educated at Heath Grammar School but left school early, aged 15, to join his father's building firm; he did however continue to study three nights a week at technical college for the national building exam. However, at the age of 18 his father died, leaving Blondie in charge. At the outbreak of war, construction was deemed a reserved occupation, but he was "mad keen on flying" and immediately volunteered for the Royal Air Force.

== RAF career ==
Walker undertook pilot training in Canada under the British Commonwealth Air Training Plan. On completion of his training he was a sergeant. He was then commissioned into the Royal Air Force Volunteer Reserve (Service No 115919) as a pilot officer on probation on 1 December 1941. He returned to the UK and converted to the Hurricane. He was then sent to the Middle East, sailing to Freetown in Sierra Leone before flying across the desert to Khartoum and on to Port Said where he was mostly protecting convoys. His first kill was a Junkers Ju 88.

In August 1942, Walker joined No. 94 Squadron, which soon received four Hawker Hurricanes donated by Lady MacRobert, whose three sons had died while serving in the RAF, one of them with No. 94 Squadron. Their names and coat of arms were painted on the nose of the aircraft, and Walker was allocated "Sir Roderic", which he flew during the North African campaign. He was promoted war substantive flying officer on 1 October 1942.

After his experiences flying with No. 94 Squadron, Walker was offered an instructor's job. He did not want this, so volunteered to transfer to No. 6 Squadron RAF who were preparing to join the war in Italy. He was promoted to war substantive flight lieutenant on 1 December 1943.

On 8 August 1944, he was awarded an "immediate" Distinguished Flying Cross (DFC), which is a field award; the citation read:

Air Ministry, 8th August 1944.

The KING has been graciously pleased to approve the following awards in recognition of gallantry displayed in flying operations against the enemy.

[...]

Distinguished Flying Cross.

[...]

Flight Lieutenant Arnold Edgar WALKER (115919), R.A.F.V.R., 6 Sqn.

This officer has achieved much success in attacks on shipping, railway communications and mechanical transport. He has displayed the greatest determination throughout and his example in the face of the enemy has been most inspiring. One night in June 1944, he attacked a small convoy and caused the destruction of a lighter. The following night, Flight Lieutenant Walker participated in a most successful attack on a small convoy consisting of 10 small craft, all of which were attacked with destructive effect. His keenness and devotion to duty have been outstanding.

On 14 November 1944 he was awarded a bar to his DFC.

However, on his return from operations in October 1944, Blondie was posted as an instructor on the Hawker Typhoon, based in the New Forest. He was released from RAF service in 1946.

== Postwar career ==
Walker returned to Halifax to re-establish the family building company, Joseph Walker & Son, which had been shut down during the war. He wrote a short memoir of his wartime experiences with the dedication: "To my two ground crew – without your fabulous service of my aircraft I would not be alive today".

Immediately after the war, Joseph Walker & Son built more than 2,000 council houses and 1,000 private houses. He continued to build houses in the Calderdale area of West Yorkshire for the next half-century. He also had building interests in Perth, Western Australia, where he would later move to.

He was a Liberal councillor for Warley Ward in Halifax during the early 1950s and was elected president of the Halifax Building Trades Council.

== Personal life ==
Walker was known to be a fierce competitor in sport, business and life. He played golf off a handicap of four, was captain of West End Golf Club, Halifax and also made an honorary member of The Royal Perth Golf Club. He skied virtually every year in Kitzbühel from 1948 until he was 80 years old. He was known in Kitzbühel as "Halifax", some locals even assuming he was the Earl of Halifax.

He married three times. He married Maisie, who he had known since he was 18 before being sent to the Middle East in 1941. He had a son, Johnny who predeceased him in 2007, a daughter, Diana, three stepsons and two grandchildren, Melissa and Daniel.

In later life, Walker lived nine months of the year in Perth, spending the remainder in his hometown of Halifax, West Yorkshire.
