= Music for a Slaughtering Tribe =

Studio album by Wumpscut
- Released: December 20, 1993
- Recorded: 1993
- Genre: Electro-industrial
- Length: 56:58
- Label: VUZ
- Producer: Rudy Ratzinger

Wumpscut chronology
Small Chambermusicians (1991)	Music for a Slaughtering Tribe (1993)	Dried Blood (1994)

Music for a Slaughtering Tribe is the third release and first full-length album by the German electro-industrial project Wumpscut.

== Summary ==
Music for a Slaughtering Tribe, like most Wumpscut releases, has a complex history and bears the blood-curdling scream of Aleta Welling on the track "Fear In Motion." Music for a Slaughtering Tribe has been re-released at least eight times – with many subsequent editions on different record labels, with different artwork, and sometimes different track lists. The latest release is on Beton Kopf Media and Metropolis Records.

All Soylent Green samples are taken from the movie 2022 – Die Überleben Wollen, the German-dubbed version of Soylent Green (Richard Fleischer, 1973), with Charlton Heston. Koslow sample is taken from the movie The Silence of the Lambs (1991), with Anthony Hopkins and Jodie Foster.

== Track listing ==
Music for a Slaughtering Tribe (1993 edition by VUZ, 1993 edition by VUZ and Subtronic, 1993 "farewell edition" by VUZ)

1. "Soylent Green" – 6:08
2. "On the Run" – 4:19
3. "Koslow" – 3:29
4. "Fear in Motion" – 3:14
5. "Dudek" – 3:58
6. "Default Remixx" – 3:34
7. "Bleed" – 2:46
8. "Concrete Rage" – 4:29
9. "Believe in Me" – 6:01
10. "She's Dead" – 5:14
11. "Rotten Meat" – 3:53
12. "The Day's Disdain" – 5:31
13. "Float" – 1:50
14. "My Life" – 2:24

Music for a Slaughtering Tribe II (1997 re-release, 2000 edition, 2000 edition by Metropolis Records)

Disc one is identical to the original.

Disc two

1. "Fear In Motion (Remyl)" – 4:51
2. "She's Dead (Kirlian Camera)" – 6:48
3. "Soylent Green (Haujobb)" – 10:08
4. "Fear In Motion (Haujobb)" – 6:34
5. "Dudek (Brain Leisure)" – 5:13
6. "Default (Aghast View)" – 4:39
7. "Float (Dive)" – 2:44
8. "Soylent Green (Brain Leisure)" – 11:22

Music for a Slaughtering Tribe (1997 edition by Metropolis Records)

1. "Soylent Green (extended version)" – 7:14
2. "On the Run" – 4:09
3. "Bleed" – 2:43
4. "Fear in Motion" – 3:12
5. "Default (remix by Aghast View)" ( – 4:35)
6. "Concrete Rage" – 4:19
7. "She's Dead (remix by Kirlian Camera)" – 6:44
8. "Koslow" – 3:27
9. "Default" – 3:36
10. "She's Dead" – 5:11
11. "Believe in Me" – 6:00
12. "Dudek" – 4:00
13. "My Life" – 2:26
14. [blank] – 0:30
15. [blank] – 0:30
16. [blank] – 0:30
17. "Hint on BT 7 (hidden track)" – 0:31

Music for a Slaughtering Tribe (2002, "seamless audio edition" and 2003, "back is front edition")

Disc one

1. "Soylent Green"
2. "On the Run"
3. "Fear in Motion"
4. "Koslow"
5. "Concrete Rage"
6. "Bleed"
7. "Dudek"
8. "Default"
9. "Believe in Me"
10. "She is Dead"
11. "Float"
12. "Rotten Meat"
13. "The Day's Disdain"
14. "My Life"

Disc two

1. "Soylent Green (Brain Leisure)"
2. "Soylent Green (Haujobb)"
3. "Fear in Motion (Haujobb)"
4. "Fear in Motion (Remyl)"
5. "She is Dead (Kirlian Camera)"
6. "Dudek (Brain Leisure)"
7. "Default (Aghast View)"
8. "Float (Dive)"

Music for a Slaughtering Tribe (remastered, 2005, Metropolis Records edition, 2005)

1. "Soylent Green"
2. "On the Run"
3. "Koslow"
4. "Fear in Motion"
5. "Dudek"
6. "Default"
7. "Bleed"
8. "Concrete Rage"
9. "Believe in Me"
10. "She's Dead"
11. "Rotten Meat"
12. "The Day's Disdain"
13. "Float"
14. "My Life"
15. "Soylent Green (Haujobb)"
16. "She is Dead (Kirlian Camera)"
17. "Soylent Green (Brain Leisure)"
