= Wreath of Barbs =

Studio album by Wumpscut
- Released: 2001

Wreath of Barbs is a studio album by the industrial band Wumpscut. It was released in 2001. The album peaked at #13 on the CMJ RPM Charts in the U.S.

== Reception ==
Professional ratings
Review scores
Source	Rating
AllMusic	3/5 stars

Exclaim! described it as a "celebration of darkness and foreboding" and praised "[Wumpscut founder Rudy] Ratzinger's talent for writing a catchy song", noting the presence of "several boot tappers that make you want to hit the dance floor", but warned that the album is "not for the faint-hearted" due to its "heaviness," which makes it "an exhausting listen". CMJ New Music Monthly said that it was an "epic masterpiece". PopMatters was far more negative, calling it "one of the most soul-destroying, nasty, nightmarish, and unintentionally comical albums of recent memory", with "phenomenally dull hooks" and "lyrics[...] which I guess we’re supposed to ignore (I hope)", and particularly emphasizing that the songs "Christfuck" and "Opening the Gates of Hell" were "as hilarious as their titles"; PopMatters did, however, concede that "Eclipse (Kaelte Container Remix)" features "genuine joyous danceability".

== Track listing ==
1. "Opening the Gates of Hell" – 4:08
2. "Deliverance (Album Mix)" – 4:43
3. "Wreath of Barbs (Album Mix)" – 5:23
4. "Dr. Thodt" – 4:42
5. "Mankind's Disease" – 5:10
6. "Christfuck" – 5:24*
7. "Troops Under Fire" – 4:58
8. "Line of Corpses" – 4:42
9. "Hate Is Mine" – 4:27
10. "Bleed in Silence" – 6:00
11. "Eclipse (Kaelte Container Remix)" – 5:12
- The song "Christfuck" samples dialog from the movie Fight Club.
- The songs "Opening the Gates of Hell," "Mankind's Disease," and "Line of Corpses" contain dialog from the film The Last Temptation of Christ.
- The song "Hate is Mine" contains dialog from the films Con Air and Dune.
