= Wumpscut =

German industrial and EBM music project

- Also known as: Rudy Ratzinger
- Born: Rudolf Ratzinger; 3 June 1966 (age 59); Gangkofen, Bavaria, West Germany
- Origin: Munich, Bavaria, Germany
- Genres: Electro-industrial; dark ambient; EBM
- Years active: 1991–present
- Labels: VUZ; Ant-Zen; Beton Kopf Media; OBUH; Subtronic; Nova Tekk; Metropolis; XIII Bis; Art Music Group

Wumpscut (stylised as :wumpscut: or simply :w:) is a gothic-influenced electro-industrial music project from Germany. It was founded in May 1991 by Bavarian disc jockey Rudolf "Rudy" Ratzinger (born 1966). Through 2016, Rudy Ratzinger released seventeen studio albums plus a number of compilations: demos, compilation tracks, and remixes from deleted singles and EPs.

== History ==
Rudy Ratzinger is the sole member of Wumpscut, occasionally employing the help of guest artists (such as Aleta Welling, P·A·L, Selene etc.), although such collaborations were minimal in scope. Ratzinger cites the influence of such bands as Leæther Strip as his reason for making the transfer from DJing to recording music: "I was a DJ for several years and was tired of offering the audience only alien stuff. The first Leæther Strip works were responsible for trying something on my own."

First works performed by Wumpscut dates back to the early 1990s when Rudy Ratzinger started to play music in Bavarian club houses and in Southern Germany. In a 1997 interview, Rudy Ratzinger reveals that "Pornography" and "War Combattery" were his first two songs in EBM, those two four-minute songs are to be found on Defcon, the first demo issued by Wumpscut in late 1991. Yet, only "Pornography" was picked for reappearance on Blutkind (although a remix of War Combattery surfaced on the Mesner Tracks re-release EP which was released before). According to Rudy, "War Combattery" was a great hit in club houses: "[It] was a very big success in the clubs in Southern Germany."

The first full-length release from Wumpscut was 1993's Music for a Slaughtering Tribe. The release contained the song "Soylent Green", which is named after the 1973 movie and also contains audio samples from the German dubbed version. The song first attracted attention to Wumpscut and became a frequently played song at events and clubs in the goth and industrial subcultures, in Germany, UK and the United States.

1994 saw the release of two EPs, Dried Blood and Gomorra, the latter named in reference to Operation Gomorrah, the code name used by the British for the bombing of the city of Hamburg in World War II. The following year saw Wumpscut's second full-length release, Bunkertor 7.

The 1997 album, Embryodead reached No. 20 on the CMJ RPM chart in the U.S.

In 1999, Wumpscut released Boeses Junges Fleisch ("Evil Young Flesh"), an album conceptually based on the life and events of German serial killer Fritz Haarmann and themes of unrequited love, hate, lust, and violence more generally. The album reached No. 25 on the CMJ RPM chart (US) and No. 17 on the German Alternative Charts (DAC).

The 2000 EP release of Blutkind ("Blood child") reached No. 5 on the DAC Top 50 Albums of 2000 (Germany) and No. 17 on the CMJ RPM Charts in the US.

In 2001, Wumpscut released Wreath of Barbs, which reached No. 13 on the CMJ RPM Chart in the US. Concurrent with the release, Ratzinger announced a remix contest for the track "Wreath of Barbs", providing samples through his Web site and encouraging any and all musicians to submit a remix for the chance of being included on the subsequent Wreath of Barbs MCD. Ratzinger felt this was an opportunity to give unknown artists a chance at exposure in what otherwise had become an insular remix ecosystem.

Beginning with Bunkertor 7, Wumpscut produced elaborate box set releases including limited versions of CD or LP releases with additional and bonus material (bonus tracks, "liquid soylent" energy drinks, posters, pins, stickers, bags, flags, etc.). Wumpscut albums were reissued with variant artworks, remastering and track listings. Standalone merchandise such as baseball caps, coffee mugs and t-shirts were also made available for purchase.

The sixteenth Wumpscut album, Wüterich, was released on 25 March 2016 on the Metropolis label. He released a "best of" album titled Innerfire on 5 May 2017, while also announcing that Wumpscut would no longer be producing or making any new music on his Facebook and Twitter accounts.

On 5 November 2020, a new album entitled "Fledermavs 303" was announced with the release of a teaser track through the Wumpscut page on Bandcamp, presumably implying that Rudy has returned to producing music again.

On 2 April 2021, a new album entitled "Fledermavs 303" was released.

== Record labels ==
Ratzinger started his own record label, Beton Kopf Media, in 1995, used exclusively to release Wumpscut material to the European market. In 1996, he started the label Mental Ulcer Forges which lapsed in the early 2000s, then relaunched in 2006. The label released albums by the following bands: Remyl, Noisex, B-Ton-K, Yendri, F/A/V, Anaesth, Infact, Pineal Gland Zirbeldruese. Rudy also managed the label Fleisskoma with Karl Kimmerl (B-Ton-K), which has released work by the electronic band Press to Transmit.

== Live performance ==
Despite the project's popularity in the electro-industrial genre, Wumpscut is a studio-only project and never tours. When asked for his reason behind this decision, Rudy commented: "I cannot come up to my self-set level."

== See also ==
- List of electro-industrial bands
