= NASA Astronaut Group 7 =

1969 human spaceflight selection of 7 candidates

Group 7
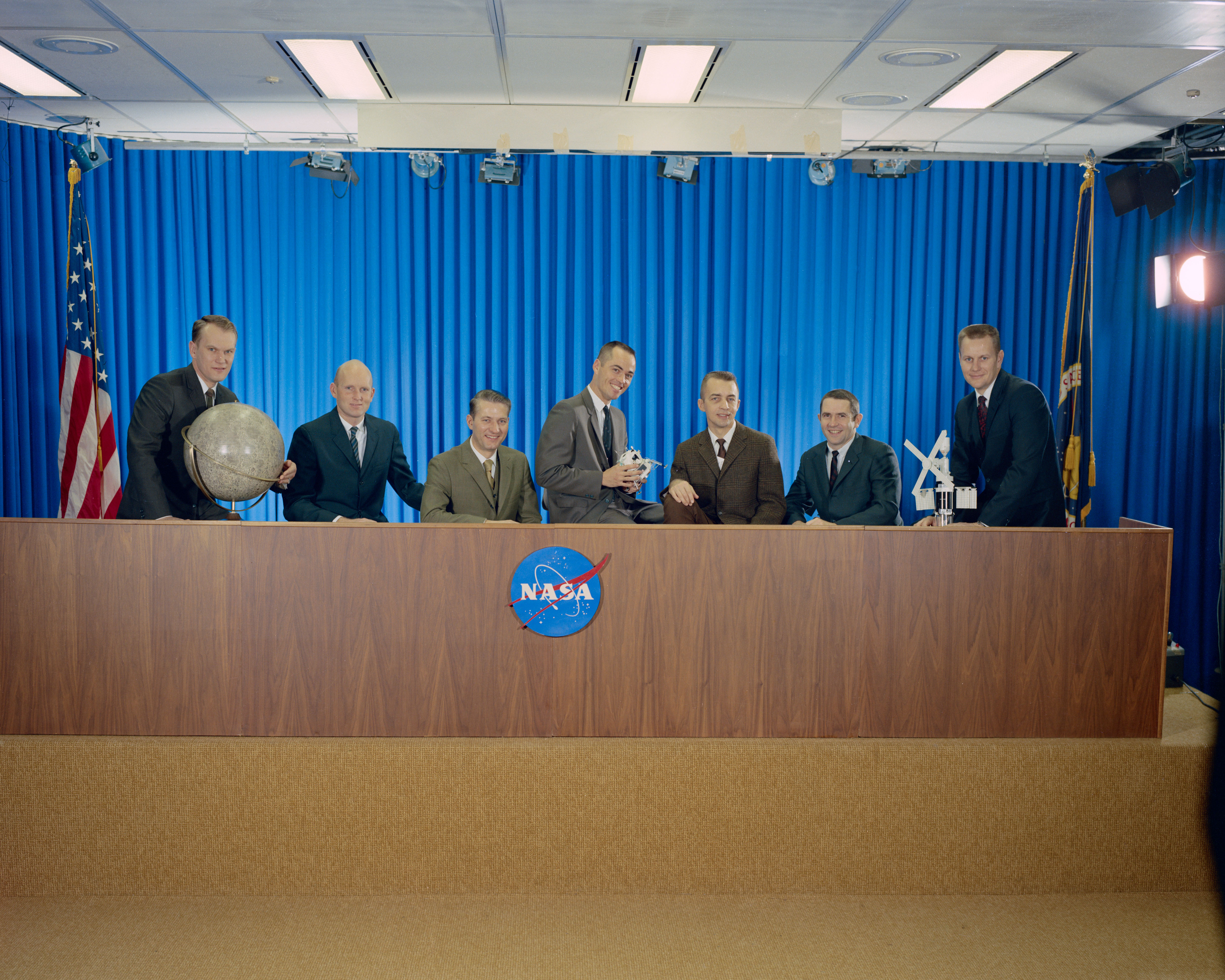
- Group 7 astronauts. Left to right: Bobko, Fullerton, Hartsfield, Crippen, Peterson, Truly and Overmyer.
- Year selected: 1969
- Number selected: 7

NASA Astronaut Group 7 was a group of seven astronauts accepted by the National Aeronautics and Space Administration (NASA) on August 14, 1969. It was the last group to be selected during the Project Apollo era, and the first since the Mercury Seven in which all members were active-duty military personnel, and all made flights into space.

The Manned Orbiting Laboratory (MOL) was a semi-secret United States Air Force (USAF) space project, with a public face but a covert reconnaissance mission. Seventeen astronauts were selected for the program in three intakes in 1965, 1966 and 1967. They were drawn from the USAF, US Navy and US Marine Corps, but all were graduates of the USAF Aerospace Research Pilot School. The MOL program intended to use a modified NASA Project Gemini spacecraft known as Gemini B.

When the MOL program was canceled in June 1969, fourteen astronauts remained in the program. NASA accepted the seven youngest as NASA astronauts. By the time they joined NASA, all Apollo flight assignments had been lined up, but they were given non-flying support assignments for Apollo, Skylab and the Apollo-Soyuz Test Project. The former MOL astronauts went on to form the core of early Space Shuttle pilots, upgrading to commander after their first flight, and flying 17 missions between them.

== Background ==
On August 25, 1962, the United States Air Force began studies of a manned spy satellite, which became the Manned Orbiting Laboratory (MOL). President Lyndon Johnson announced the MOL Program on August 25, 1965. Military astronauts would use the Gemini B spacecraft. MOL was a semi-secret project, with public experiments but a covert reconnaissance mission.

== Selection ==
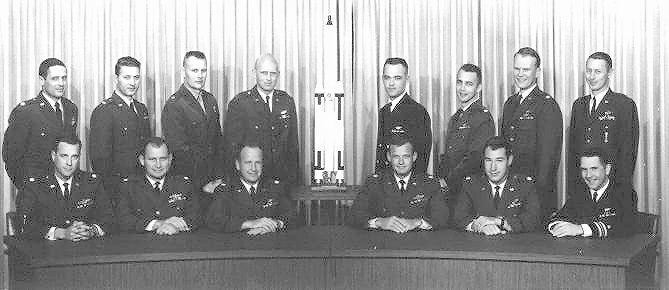
The fourteen remaining MOL astronauts in 1968. Back row, left to right: Robert T. Herres, Henry W. Hartsfield, Jr., Robert F. Overmyer, C. Gordon Fullerton, Robert L. Crippen, Donald H. Peterson, Karol J. Bobko and James A. Abrahamson. Front row, left top right: Lachlan Macleay, Richard E. Lawyer, James M. Taylor, Albert H. Crews, Francis G. Neubeck and Richard H. Truly. Absent: Michael J. Adams, John L. Finley and Robert H. Lawrence

The selection criteria for MOL astronauts was:

- Qualified military pilots;
- Graduates of the Aerospace Research Pilot School (ARPS);
- Serving officers, recommended by their commanding officers; and
- Holding US citizenship from birth.

No call for volunteers was issued for the first group; fifteen candidates, all ARPS graduates, were selected for a week of medical evaluation in October 1964. The evaluations were similar to those conducted for the NASA astronaut groups. The names of the first group of eight MOL astronauts were publicly announced on November 12, 1965. Five more were announced on June 17, 1966, and four more on June 30, 1967.

== Transfer to NASA ==
On June 10, 1969, the MOL Project was canceled. Fourteen of its seventeen astronauts were still with the program; John L. Finley had returned to the Navy, Michael J. Adams transferred to the X-15, and Robert H. Lawrence died during training. Many had hoped since childhood to travel to space. The program asked NASA if it could use MOL resources, including astronauts. Most of the 14 wanted to transfer.

Director of Flight Crew Operations Deke Slayton told the MOL group that he did not need more astronauts for a diminishing number of Apollo and Apollo Applications Program flights. Manned Spacecraft Center director Robert R. Gilruth agreed, but Deputy Administrator of NASA George Mueller thought that sooner or later the agency would need help from the USAF, and maintaining good relations was good policy. Slayton and Gilruth agreed to take the seven who were 35 or younger. NASA also took Albert H. Crews as a test pilot. The transfer of the seven MOL astronauts was announced on August 14, 1969.

== Group members ==
Image	Name	Born	Died	Career	Refs
Portrait	Karol J. Bobko	Queens, New York; December 23, 1937	Half Moon Bay, California; August 17, 2023	Bobko was ranked 27th in the first graduating class of the United States Air Force Academy, from which he received a Bachelor of Science degree in 1959. He became its first graduate to become an astronaut. He graduated from the ARPS with class 65-C in 1965, and earned a Master of Science degree in aerospace engineering from the University of Southern California in 1970. Bobko was a member of the support crew for the Apollo-Soyuz Test Project in July 1975 and the Space Shuttle Approach and Landing Tests at Edwards Air Force Base in 1977. He flew in space three times: as pilot of STS-6, the maiden flight of the Space Shuttle Challenger in April 1983; as commander of STS-51-D in the Space Shuttle Discovery in April 1985; and as commander of STS-51-J, the maiden flight of the Space Shuttle Atlantis in October 1985, and is the only astronaut to have flown on the maiden flights of two space shuttles. He retired from NASA on November 30, 1988, and from the USAF with the rank of colonel on January 1, 1989.	
Portrait	Robert L. Crippen	Beaumont, Texas; September 11, 1937		Crippen received a Bachelor of Science degree in aerospace engineering from the University of Texas in 1960, and was commissioned in the US Navy through its Aviation Officer Candidate School. He graduated from the ARPS with class 65-A in 1965. Crippen was a member of astronaut support crew for the Skylab 2, 3, and 4 in 1973 and 1974, and the Apollo-Soyuz Test Project in July 1975. He flew in space four times. His first mission was in April 1981 as pilot of STS-1, the first Space Shuttle mission and the maiden flight of the Space Shuttle Columbia. He subsequently commanded three missions in the Space Shuttle Challenger: STS-7 in June 1983, STS-41-C in April 1984, and STS-41-G in October 1984. He served as deputy director for Shuttle Operations at the Kennedy Space Center from 1986 to 1989; director of the Space Shuttle Program at NASA Headquarters in Washington, DC, from 1990 to 1992; and director of the Kennedy Space Center from 1992 to 1995. He retired from the Navy with the rank of captain in 1991, and from NASA in 1995.	
Portrait	C. Gordon Fullerton	Rochester, New York; October 11, 1936	August 21, 2013	Fullerton earned Bachelor of Science and Master of Science degrees in mechanical engineering from the California Institute of Technology in 1957 and 1958 respectively. He was commissioned in the USAF in 1958 through the Air Force Reserve Officer Training Corps program, and graduated from the ARPS with class 64-B in 1965. Fullerton served on the support crews for the Apollo 14 and 17 lunar landing missions, and was a CAPCOM for Apollo 14, 15, 16 and 17, and piloted the Space Shuttle Enterprise in the Approach and Landing Tests in February through October 1977. He flew in space twice: as pilot of the Space Shuttle Columbia in the STS-3 mission in March 1982; and as commander of the Space Shuttle Challenger in the STS-51-F mission in July 1985. He retired from the Air Force in 1988 with the rank of colonel. He flew the Shuttle Carrier Aircraft for several years, ferrying space shuttles between Edwards and the Kennedy Space Center, and served as associate director of Flight Operations at NASA's Dryden Flight Research Center. He retired from NASA in 2007.	
Portrait	Henry W. Hartsfield Jr.	Birmingham, Alabama; November 21, 1933	July 17, 2014	Hartsfield received a Bachelor of Science degree in physics from Auburn University in 1954, and a Master of Science degree in engineering science from the University of Tennessee in 1971. On graduation from Auburn University he accepted a commission in the USAF through the Army Reserve Officers' Training Corps program. He graduated from the ARPS with class 64-C in 1965. He was a member of the support crew for Apollo 16 and the Skylab 2, 3, and 4 missions. He flew in space three times: as pilot of the Space Shuttle Columbia in the STS-4 mission in June 1982; as commander of the Space Shuttle Discovery on its maiden mission, STS-41-D in August 1984; and as commander of Space Shuttle Challenger in the STS-61-A Spacelab mission in October 1985. He retired from the USAF in 1977 with the rank of colonel. Hartsfield served as Deputy Chief of the Astronaut Office from 1986 to 1987, then as the Deputy Director for Flight Crew Operations from 1987 to 1989. He had temporary assignments in the Office of Space Flight at NASA Headquarters in Washington, DC, and as the Deputy Manager for Operations in the Space Station Projects Office at the Marshall Space Flight Center in Huntsville, Alabama. In 1991 he joined the Space Station Freedom Program at the Johnson Space Center. He retired from NASA in 1998.	
Portrait	Robert F. Overmyer	Lorain, Ohio; July 14, 1936	March 22, 1996	Overmyer received a Bachelor of Science degree in physics from Baldwin Wallace College in 1958, and a Master of Science degree in aeronautics with a major in aeronautical engineering from the US Naval Postgraduate School in 1964. He enlisted in the United States Marine Corps while at Baldwin, and was commissioned on January 13, 1958. He graduated from the ARPS with class 65-C in August 1965. Overmyer was a support crew member for Apollo 17 in 1973 and the Apollo-Soyuz Test Project in 1975. He flew in space twice: as pilot of the Space Shuttle Columbia on the STS-5 mission in November 1982; and as commander of the STS-51-B Spacelab mission in the Space Shuttle Challenger in April 1985. In May 1986, he retired from both NASA and the Marine Corps, with the rank of colonel.	
Portrait	Donald H. Peterson	Winona, Mississippi; October 22, 1933	May 27, 2018	Peterson received a Bachelor of Science degree from the United States Military Academy at West Point, New York, in 1955, and joined the USAF. He earned a master's degree in nuclear engineering from the Air Force Institute of Technology in 1962. He graduated from the ARPS with class 66-B in 1967. Peterson served on the support crew for Apollo 16. He resigned from the USAF with the rank of colonel in 1979. He flew in space April 1983 on the STS-6 mission, the maiden flight of the Space Shuttle Challenger as a mission specialist. On this mission he participated in the first extravehicular activity (EVA) of the Space Shuttle program, a spacewalk lasting 4 hours and 15 minutes. He resigned from NASA in December 1984.	
Portrait	Richard H. Truly	Fayette, Mississippi; November 12, 1937	February 27, 2024	Truly received a Bachelor of Aeronautical Engineering degree from the Georgia Institute of Technology in 1959, and was commissioned on graduation through the Naval Reserve Officers Training Corps. He graduated from the ARPS with class Class 64-A in December 1964. He was a member of the support crew and capsule communicator for Skylab 2, 3, and 4 and the Apollo-Soyuz Test Project. Truly was pilot for one of the two-man crews that flew the Space Shuttle Enterprise in the Approach and Landing Tests in 1977. Truly flew in space twice: as pilot of the Space Shuttle Columbia on the STS-2 mission in November 1981; and as commander of the Space Shuttle Challenger on the STS-8 mission in August 1983. He left NASA in 1983 to become the first commander of the Naval Space Command, but returned as Associate Administrator of Space Flight on February 20, 1986. He retired from the Navy with the rank of vice admiral on June 16, 1989, shortly after being appointed the eighth Administrator of NASA. He retired from NASA in April 1992.	

== Operations ==
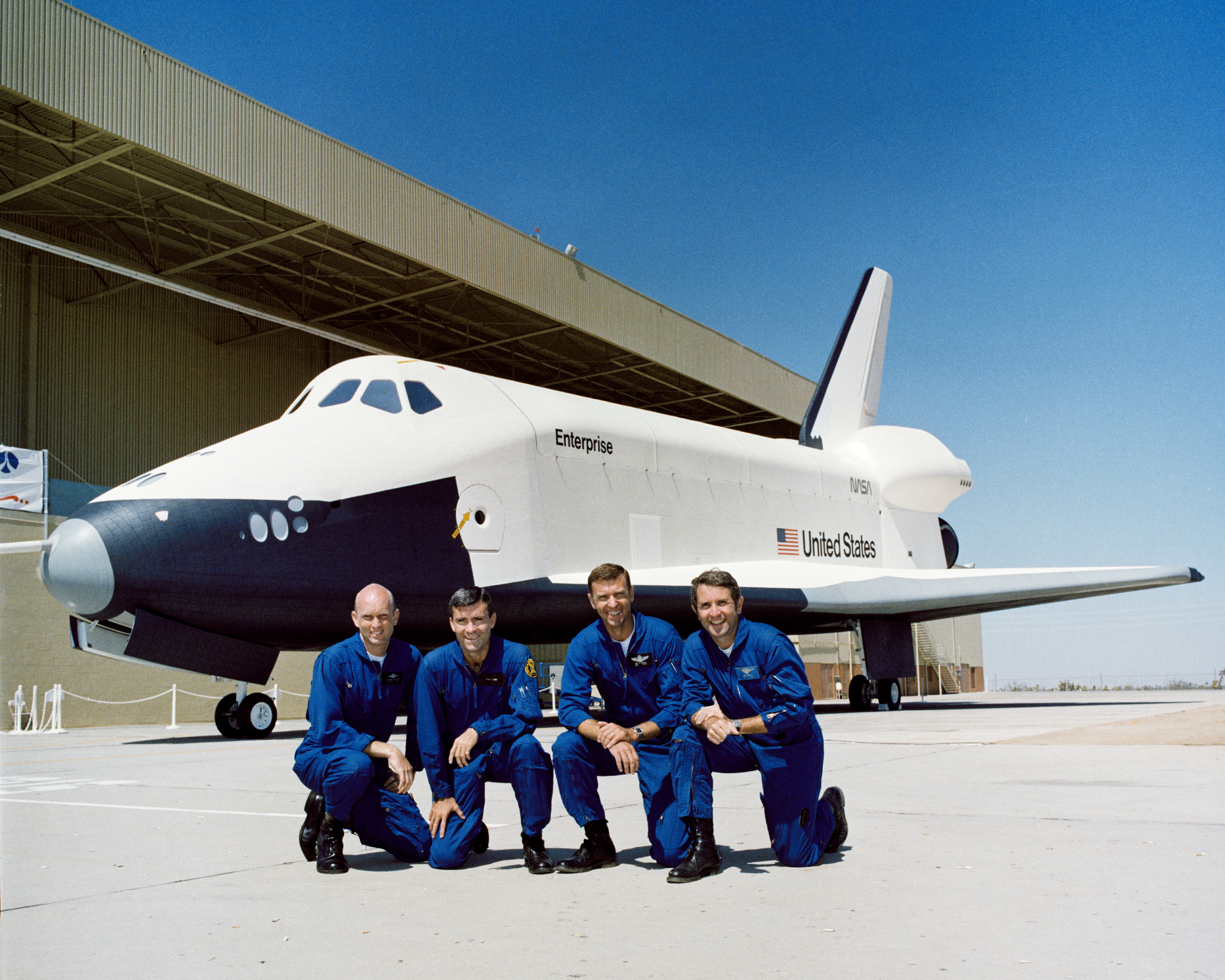
The crews for the Space Shuttle Approach and Landing Tests (ALT). Left to right: Fullerton, Haise, Engle and Truly.

The seven NASA transfers under the age limit did not go through a selection process. Some immediately started working for the agency, and others in 1970 after a year of further education. They had not trained for specific MOL missions but had received useful generic training, including jungle and water survival and Scuba school, and helped develop MOL systems. While Slayton warned the MOL transfers that they would probably not fly until the space shuttle around 1980, he did have many duties for them. The first step was selection to a mission support crew. Fullerton served on the support crews for the Apollo 14 and 17 lunar landing missions, Hartsfield and Peterson on that of Apollo 16, and Overmyer on that of Apollo 17, and they performed CAPCOM duties on those missions. Fullerton was also CAPCOM on Apollo 15 and 16. Crippen, Hartsfield and Truly served on the support crews for the Skylab missions, and Bobko, Crippen, Overmyer and Truly served on that of the Apollo-Soyuz Test Project.

On February 24, 1976, NASA announced the two crews of two astronauts to fly the Approach and Landing Tests in the Space Shuttle Enterprise. In each case, one of the MOL astronauts was paired with an experienced member of NASA Astronaut Group 5. The commander of the first crew was Fred Haise, with Fullerton as pilot, and the second was commanded by Joe Engle, with Truly as pilot. (Note: Engle had never flown in space on a NASA mission, but had received astronaut wings from the USAF after flying the X-15 above the 50 mile limit that the United States uses to determine spaceflight.) By this time, only 31 of the 73 pilot and scientist astronauts selected between 1959 and 1969 remained with NASA, and they would soon be outnumbered by the 35 newcomers selected in 1978.

All seven MOL astronauts flew on the Space Shuttle, starting with Crippen on STS-1, the first mission, in April 1981. The pattern of a senior astronaut flying as command with a member of the seven MOL astronauts as pilot was followed for the first six shuttle missions, after which all members of the group had flown. Although they had trained for Gemini spacecraft in which they would work in pairs, the April 1983 STS-6 mission was the only one in which two of them flew on the same mission. Peterson's extravehicular activity on that mission, the first in the Space Shuttle program, was the only one conducted by a member of the group. All the others would fly at least one more mission, as the mission commander, before they retired. Hartsfield commanded the last mission flown by a member of the group, STS-61A, in October and November 1985. The group flew 17 missions in total.

== Bibliography ==
- Berger, Carl (2015). "A History of the Manned Orbiting Laboratory Program Office". In Outzen, James D. (ed.). The Dorian Files Revealed: The Secret Manned Orbiting Laboratory Documents Compendium (PDF). Chantilly, Virginia: Center for the Study of National Reconnaissance. ISBN 978-1-937219-18-5. OCLC 966293037.
- Homer, Courtney V. K. (2019). Spies in Space: Reflections on National Reconnaissance and the Manned Orbiting Laboratory (PDF). Chantilly, Virginia: Center for the Study of National Reconnaissance. ISBN 978-1-937219-24-6. OCLC 1110619702.
- Orloff, Richard W. (2000). Apollo by the Numbers: A Statistical Reference (PDF). NASA History Series. Washington, DC: NASA. ISBN 978-0-16-050631-4. OCLC 44775012. SP-2000-4029.
- Shayler, David J.; Burgess, Colin (2017). The Last of NASA's Original Pilot Astronauts. Chichester: Springer-Praxis. ISBN 978-3-319-51012-5. OCLC 1023142024.
- Slayton, Donald K.; Cassutt, Michael (1994). Deke! U.S. Manned Space: From Mercury to the Shuttle. New York: Forge. ISBN 978-0-312-85503-1. OCLC 937566894.
