= Robert Henry Lawrence Jr. =

American astronaut (1935–1967)

Major Robert Henry Lawrence Jr.
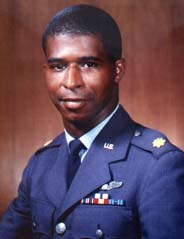
- Born: October 2, 1935; Chicago, Illinois, U.S.
- Died: December 8, 1967 (aged 32); Edwards Air Force Base, California, U.S.
- Education: Bradley University, BS 1956; Ohio State University, PhD 1965
- Occupation: Test pilot
- Space career

USAF astronaut
- Rank: Major, U.S. Air Force
- Time in space: None
- Selection: 1967 USAF MOL Group 3
- Mission: None
- Mission insignia: None

Robert Henry Lawrence Jr. (October 2, 1935 – December 8, 1967) was a United States Air Force officer and the first African-American who was selected to be an astronaut.

== Early years ==
Born and raised in Chicago, Illinois, Lawrence attended Haines Elementary School and, at age sixteen, graduated in the top 10 percent from Englewood High School in 1952. Four years later in 1956, he graduated from Bradley University with a Bachelor of Science degree in chemistry. At Bradley, Lawrence became a member of Omega Psi Phi fraternity and distinguished himself as Cadet Commander in the Air Force ROTC and received the commission of second lieutenant in the Air Force Reserve Program.

== Air Force ==
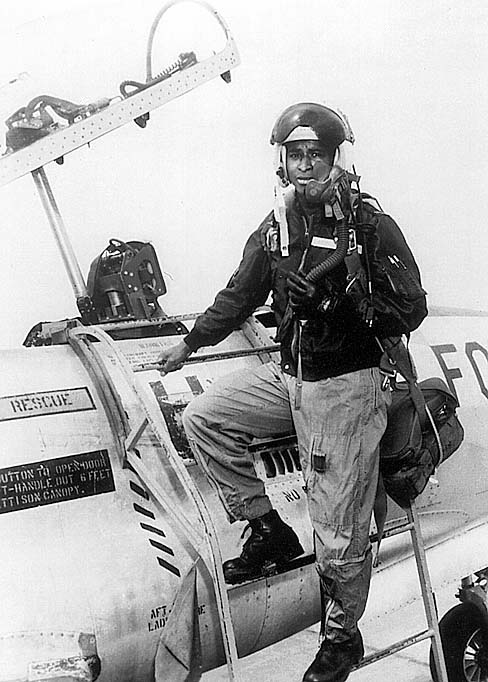
Lawrence during his Air Force career

At the age of 21, he was designated as a U.S. Air Force pilot after completing flight training at Malden Air Force Base, Missouri.

At 22, he married Barbara Cress, daughter of Dr. and Mrs. Henry Cress of Chicago. By the time he was 25, he had completed an Air Force assignment as an instructor pilot in the T-33 training aircraft for the German Air Force.

In 1965, Lawrence earned a PhD in physical chemistry from Ohio State University. His doctoral thesis was The Mechanism of the Tritium Beta Ray Induced Exchange Reaction of Deuterium with Methane and Ethane in the Gas Phase.

He was a senior USAF pilot, accumulating well over 2,500 flight hours, 2,000 of which were in jets. Lawrence flew many tests in the Lockheed F-104 Starfighter to investigate the gliding flight of various unpowered spacecraft returning to Earth from orbit, such as the North American X-15 rocket-plane. NASA cited Lawrence for accomplishments and flight maneuver data that "contributed greatly to the development of the Space Shuttle."

== Astronaut ==
"MOL was particularly exciting for Bob because being in the program offered him an opportunity to do the two things he loved most—experimental science and flying".

— Barbara Cress Lawrence, Lawrence's widow, about her late husband's MOL experience.

In June 1967, Lawrence successfully completed the U.S. Air Force Test Pilot School (Class 66B) at Edwards AFB, California. The same month, he was selected by the USAF as an astronaut in the Air Force's Manned Orbital Laboratory (MOL) program, thus becoming the country's first black astronaut.

Lawrence and other MOL astronauts laughed when asked at the announcement "Will you have to sit in the back seat of the capsule?" When asked if his selection was historic for race relations in the United States, Lawrence answered "No, I don't think so. It's another one of those things that we look forward to in civil rights—normal progression." He said that he had faced problems like other black people, but, "Perhaps I have been more fortunate than the others in the opportunities." Donald H. Peterson, chosen for MOL with Lawrence, said, "I can't speak for all the people in Mississippi," but that he was not reluctant to work with a black man.

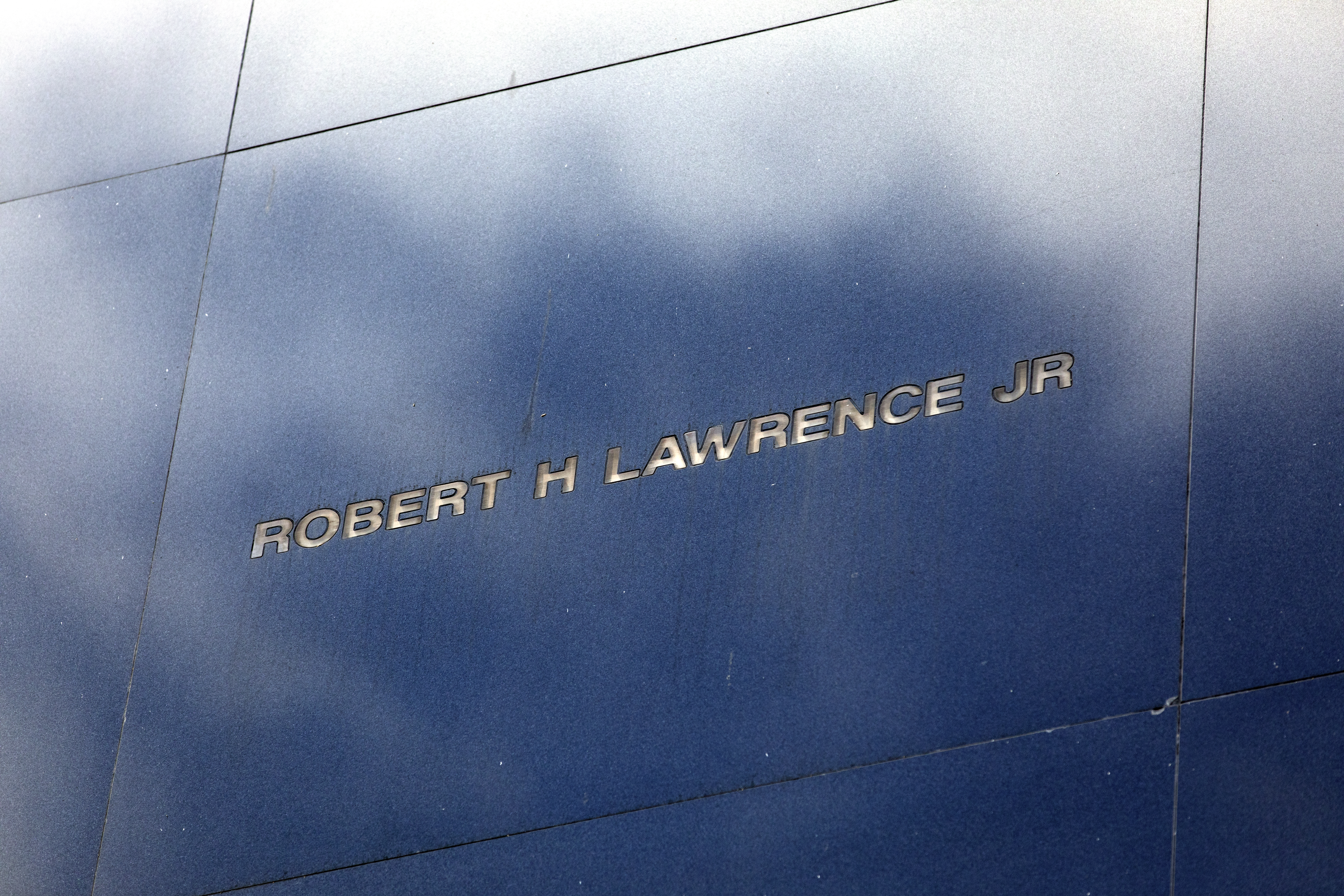
Lawrence's name inscribed on the Space Mirror Memorial

== Death and legacy ==
Statue of Lawrence at Bradley University

At age 32, Lawrence was killed in a plane crash at Edwards AFB on December 8, 1967. He was flying backseat in an F-104 as the instructor pilot for flight test trainee Major Harvey Royer, who was learning the steep-descent glide technique. Royer made such an approach but flared too late.

The airplane struck the ground hard, its main gear failed, it caught fire, and rolled. The canopy shattered and the plane bounced and skidded on the runway for 2,000 feet (610 m). Major Royer ejected upward and survived, with major injuries. The back seat, which delays a moment to avoid hitting the front seat, ejected sideways, killing Lawrence instantly. He was still strapped to his ejector seat; his parachute failed to open and was dragged 75 feet (23 m) from the wreck.

Had Lawrence lived, he likely would have been among the MOL astronauts who became NASA Astronaut Group 7 after MOL's cancellation, all of whom flew on the Space Shuttle.

During his brief career, Lawrence earned the Air Force Commendation Medal, the Outstanding Unit Citation. On December 8, 1997, his name was inscribed on the Space Mirror Memorial at the Kennedy Space Center in Florida.

A sidewalk plaque honoring Lawrence, part of the Bronzeville Walk of Fame, can be found in his home town of Chicago, near the Victory Memorial on the median of Martin Luther King Drive near 35th Street.

The 13th Northrop Grumman Cygnus spacecraft, which launched on February 15, 2020, was named the S.S. Robert H. Lawrence in his honor.

The artist Tavares Strachan dedicated his satellite sculpture ENOCH, launched in 2018, to Lawrence.

In 2020, NASA included Lawrence in a group of 27 pioneering African-American, Hispanic, and Native American astronauts to commemorate by naming asteroids after them. The asteroid, Robertlawrence 92892, is located in the main asteroid belt between Mars and Jupiter.

In February 2025, Lawrence's alma mater, Bradley University, installed an art installation commemorating him.

== See also ==
- Ed Dwight – The first African-American astronaut candidate
