= Donald H. Peterson =

American astronaut (1933–2018)

Donald Peterson
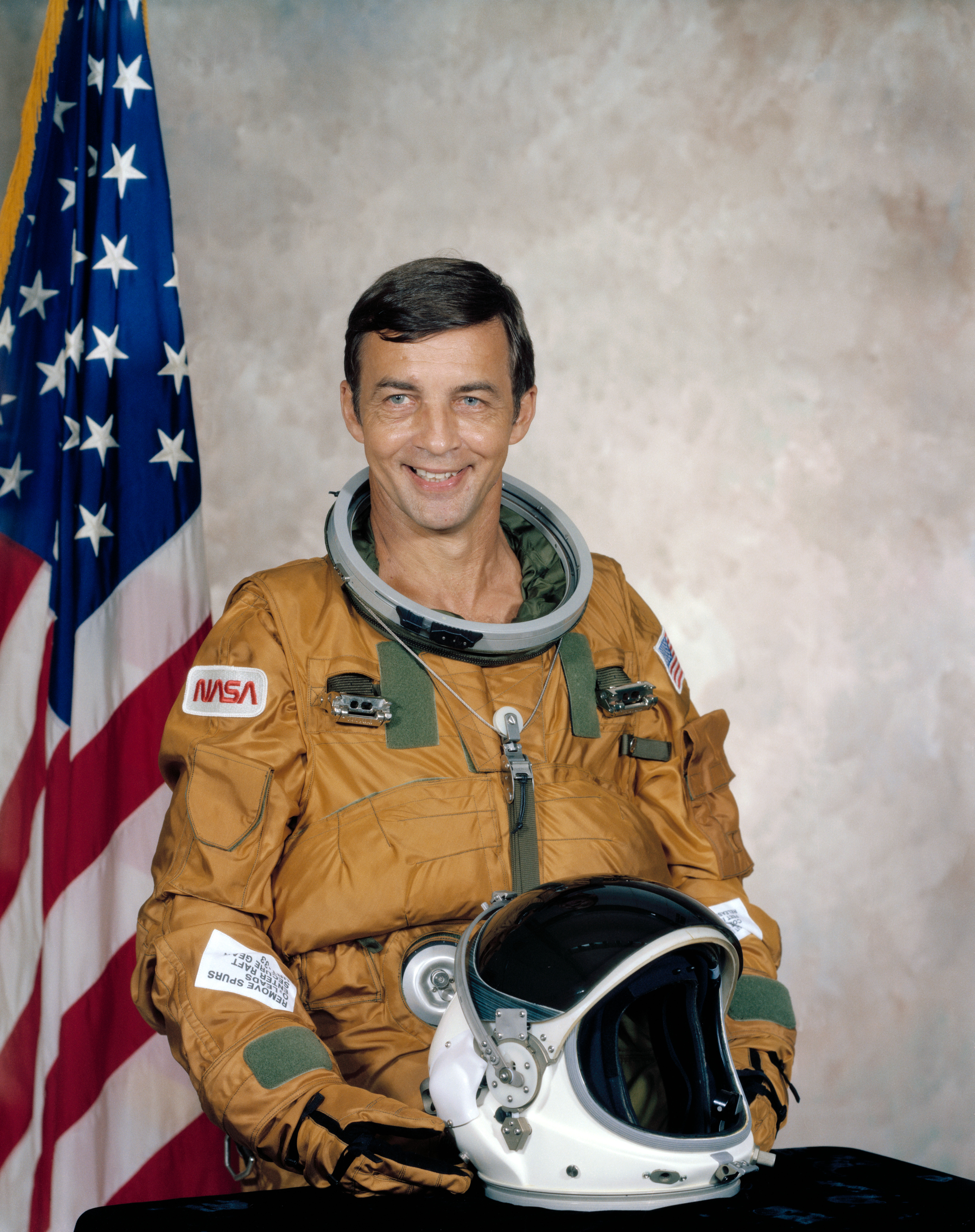
- Born: Donald Herod Peterson; October 22, 1933; Winona, Mississippi, U.S.
- Died: May 27, 2018 (aged 84); El Lago, Texas, U.S.
- Education: United States Military Academy (BS); Air University (MS)
- Space career

NASA astronaut
- Rank: Colonel, USAF
- Time in space: 5d 23m
- Selection: USAF MOL Group 3 (1967); NASA Group 7 (1969)
- Total EVAs: 1
- Total EVA time: 4h 17m
- Missions: STS-6
- Retired: November 1984

Donald Herod Peterson (October 22, 1933 – May 27, 2018) was a United States Air Force officer and NASA astronaut. Peterson was originally selected for the Air Force Manned Orbiting Laboratory (MOL) program, but, when that was canceled, he became a NASA astronaut in September 1969. He was a mission specialist on STS-6 on board Challenger. During the mission Peterson performed a spacewalk to test the new airlock and space suits. He logged 120 hours in space. Peterson retired from NASA in 1984.

== Biography ==
=== Early life and education ===
Donald Peterson was born in Winona, Mississippi, on October 22, 1933. Peterson graduated from Winona High School in 1951. One of his high school teachers said, "I never did hear any adverse criticism of him by students or teachers. He was just superior."

Peterson desired financial help for college, and after listening to a Navy recruiter's speech, elected to join a service academy. He enrolled in the United States Military Academy at West Point, New York, and received a Bachelor of Science degree in 1955, electing to join the Air Force. He was commissioned as a second lieutenant.

After working with Air Training Command until 1960, he was asked if he would be interested in getting a degree in nuclear engineering so he could join a program involving aircraft powered by a nuclear reactor. He enrolled in nuclear engineering at the U.S. Air Force Institute of Technology of Air University. Six months before graduation, the program was cancelled. He earned his Master of Science degree in 1962. He also worked towards his Ph.D. at the University of Texas.

=== USAF career ===
After graduating from West Point in 1955, his assignments included four years as a flight instructor and military training officer with the Air Training Command, three years as a nuclear systems analyst with the Air Force Systems Command, and one year as a fighter pilot with Tactical Air Command, including three months of combat weapons training.

He was a graduate of the Aerospace Research Pilot School at Edwards Air Force Base, California, and was one of the third group of astronauts assigned to the USAF Manned Orbiting Laboratory (MOL) program.

He logged over 5,300 hours flying time, including more than 5,000 hours in jet aircraft.

=== NASA career ===
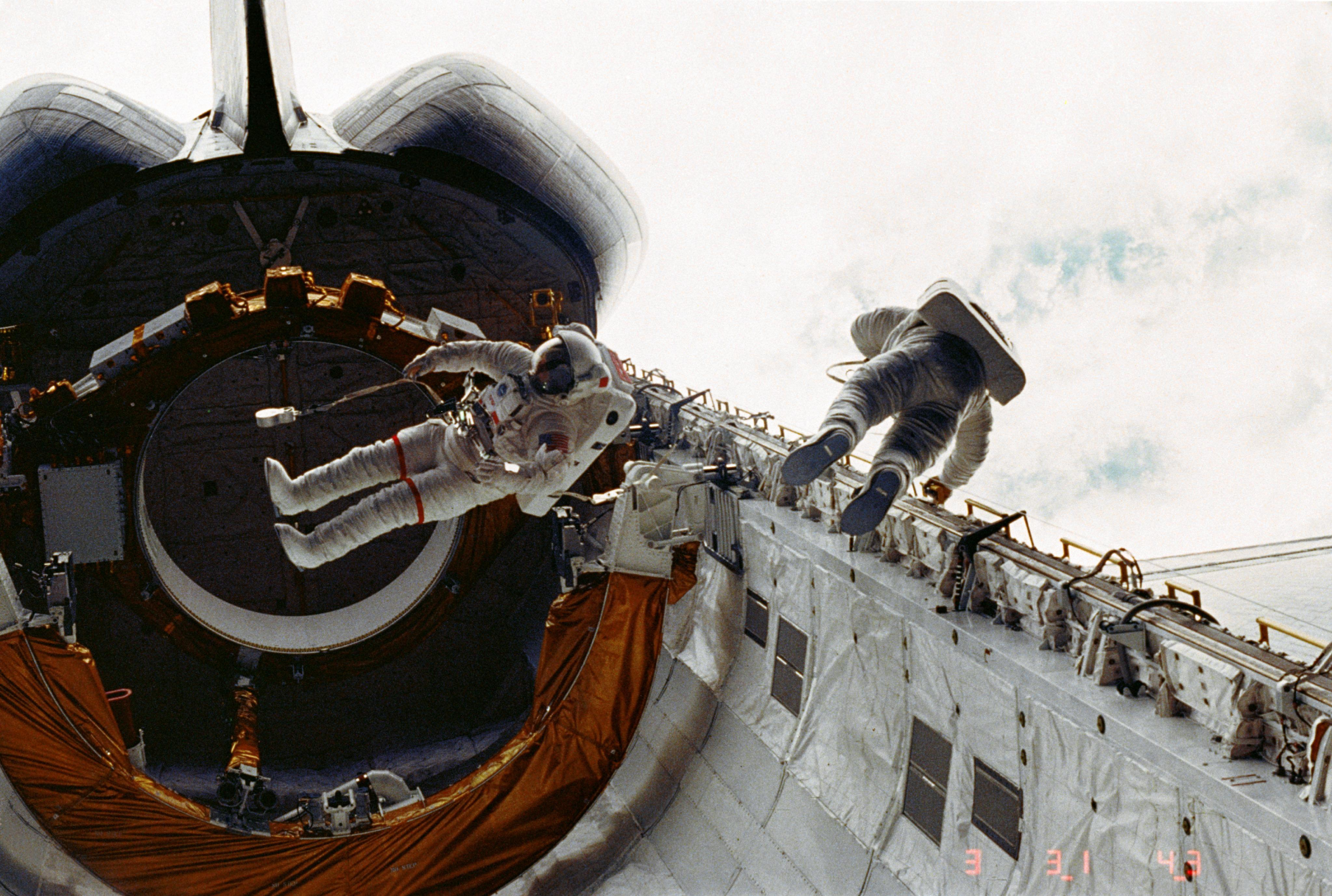
Peterson and Musgrave performing the Shuttle's first EVA during STS-6

Peterson became part of NASA Astronaut Group 7 in September 1969 after the MOL program was cancelled. He served on the astronaut support crew for Apollo 16.

Peterson retired from the United States Air Force with the rank of colonel after having completed more than 24 years of active service, but continued his assignment as a NASA astronaut in a civilian capacity. His areas of responsibility included engineering support, man/machine interface, and safety assessment.

Medical issues likely prevented Peterson from training as a space shuttle pilot. He was a mission specialist on STS-6, which launched from Kennedy Space Center, Florida, on April 4, 1983. He was accompanied by Paul J. Weitz (spacecraft commander), Col. Karol J. Bobko (Pilot), and Dr. Story Musgrave (Mission Specialist). The crew had a combined 111 years of flying experience and an average age of 48 years and 5 months. The crew was dubbed "The Geritol Bunch" for their high experience.

During this maiden voyage of the spacecraft Challenger, the STS-6 crew conducted numerous experiments in materials processing, recorded lightning activities, deployed the first tracking and data relay satellite (TDRS-A), and activated three Getaway Specials. Peterson and Musgrave conducted the Shuttle program's first extravehicular activity (EVA) to test the new suit, the Shuttle airlock, and new tools and techniques for construction and repair outside a spacecraft. After 120 hours of orbital operations STS-6 landed on the concrete runway at Edwards Air Force Base, California, on April 9, 1983. With the completion of this flight, Don Peterson had logged 4 hours 15 minutes in extravehicular activity and a total of 120 hours in space.

=== Post-NASA career ===
Peterson resigned from the NASA Astronaut Corps in November 1984 and worked as a consultant in the area of crewed aerospace operations.

=== Personal life and death ===
Peterson married Bonnie Ruth Love in 1957. They had three children. She died in 2017. He died on May 27, 2018, at his home in El Lago, Texas, of Alzheimer's disease and bone cancer, at the age of 84.

== Honors ==
He was awarded the Air Force Commendation Medal, the Meritorious Service Medal, and the JSC Group Achievement Award (1972).
