= John L. Finley =

United States Navy aviator selected as an astronaut

John "Jack" Lawrence Finley
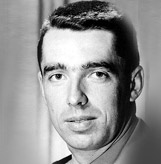
- Born: December 22, 1935; Winchester, Massachusetts, U.S.
- Died: September 19, 2006 (aged 70); Memphis, Tennessee, U.S.
- Occupation: Test pilot
- Space career

USAF astronaut
- Rank: Captain, USN
- Selection: 1965 USAF MOL Group 1
- Missions: None

John "Jack" Lawrence Finley (December 22, 1935 – September 19, 2006) was a United States Navy aviator and was selected as an astronaut.

He graduated from the United States Naval Academy in 1957, received his naval commission and underwent flight training at Naval Air Station Pensacola, Florida, which he completed in August 1958. He next served with Air Training Unit 203 at NAS Chase Field, Texas, after which he was transferred as F-8 Crusader pilot to the Fighter Squadron 51 (VF-51) on board the aircraft carrier USS Ticonderoga. After four years in this assignment, he was assigned to the staff of the Carrier Air Wing Five (CVW-5) as the CVW-5 landing signal officer (LSO), where he was the senior LSO responsible for the safety of carrier landings by the wing's assigned aircraft and pilots.

In the space program, you can't be impatient, but that's what Jack was. He was hard-charging and always willing to take on new challenges, the more the better.

— Richard H. Truly, describing his MOL colleague.

In 1964, Finley attended the Aerospace Research Pilot School at Edwards Air Force Base, California (Class 64-A). After graduation, he became an instructor at Edwards.

Finley was selected as a USAF astronaut on November 12, 1965, envisaged to fly military Gemini missions in the Manned Orbiting Laboratory project. The project was delayed and eventually terminated. He resigned as astronaut in April 1968 and returned to the operational Navy.

Subsequent assignments included a tour of duty in Vietnam in 1968. He subsequently served with the "Sundowners" of Fighter Squadron 111 (VF-111) at NAS Miramar, California flying the F-4 Phantom II, the "Evaluators" of Air Test and Evaluation Squadron 4 (VX-4) at NAS Point Mugu, California as project officer, and Executive Officer and later Commanding Officer of the "Screaming Eagles" of VF-51, also flying the F-4.

During 1974 and 1975, he served at the Navy Department's Bureau of Personnel in Washington, after which he was appointed as Commander of Carrier Air Wing Five (CVW-5) in San Francisco (1975–1976); followed by supervisor of the Naval School (1976–1977). On April 16, 1977, he accepted command of the replenishment ship/fleet oiler USS Kawishiwi homeported in Pearl Harbor, a position he held until his retirement in May 1980. In total, he logged over 3,000 hours of flying time during his Navy career, and made more than 1,000 aircraft carrier landings.

After his retirement from military duty in 1980, he spent 15 years with Federal Express Corporation in Memphis, Tennessee, achieving the level of Vice President, Aircraft Line Operations, six years as Executive Vice President at Intrepid Aviation Partners, and two years as COO/CEO Dee Howard Aircraft Maintenance.

He died on September 19, 2006, in Memphis, Tennessee after an extended battle with diabetes and cancer. He was survived by his two daughters Vickie and Cindy (from his marriage with Florence Herlihy) and his fiancée Patty Kowalczyk.
