= C. Gordon Fullerton =

American astronaut (1936–2013)

Gordon Fullerton
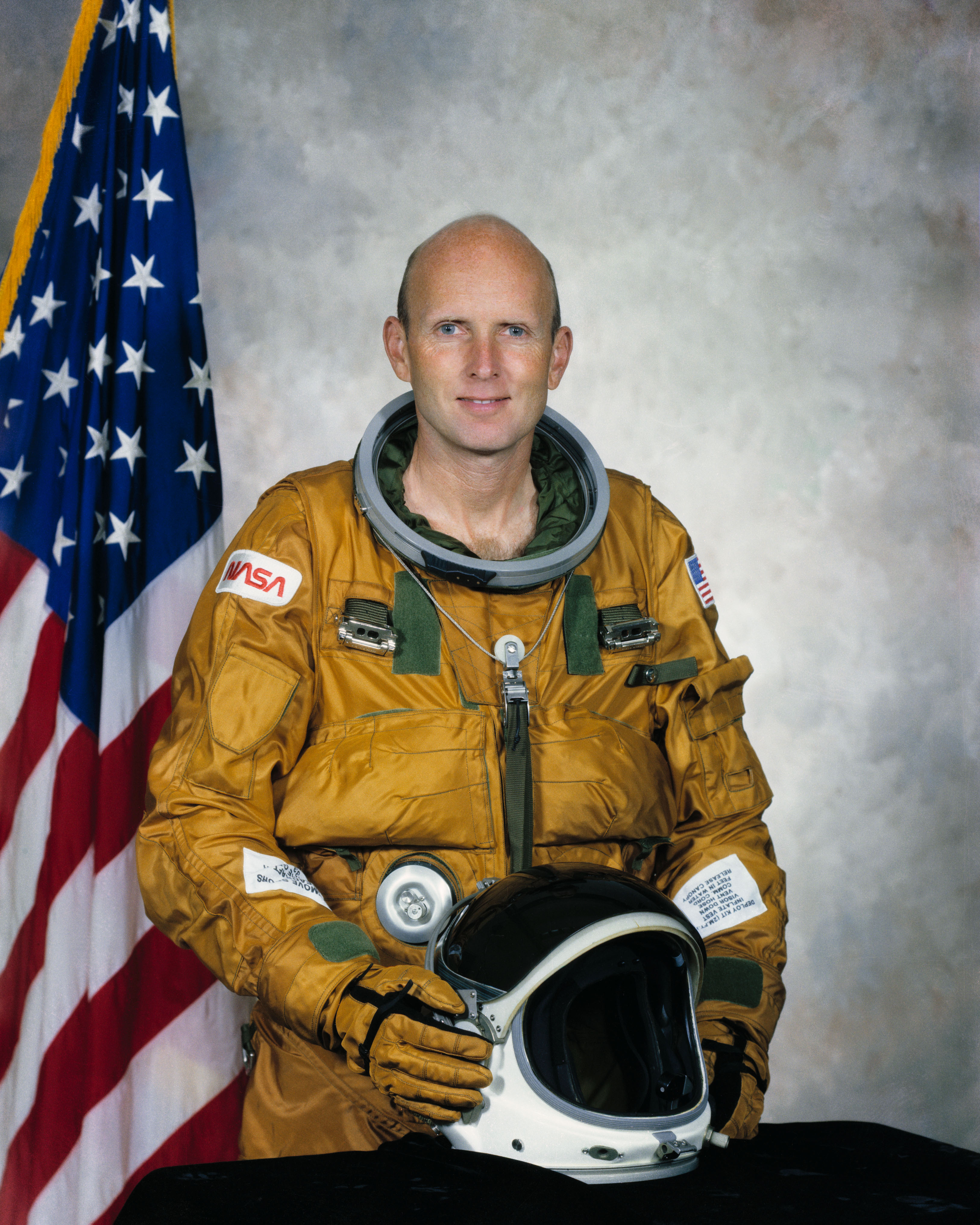
- Fullerton in 1979
- Born: Charles Gordon Fullerton; October 11, 1936; Rochester, New York, U.S.
- Died: August 21, 2013 (aged 76); Lancaster, California, U.S.
- Education: California Institute of Technology (BS, MS)
- Awards: Distinguished Flying Cross; NASA Distinguished Service Medal
- Space career

NASA astronaut
- Rank: Colonel, USAF
- Time in space: 15d 22h 50m
- Selection: USAF MOL Group 2 (1966); NASA Group 7 (1969)
- Missions: ALT; STS-3; STS-51-F
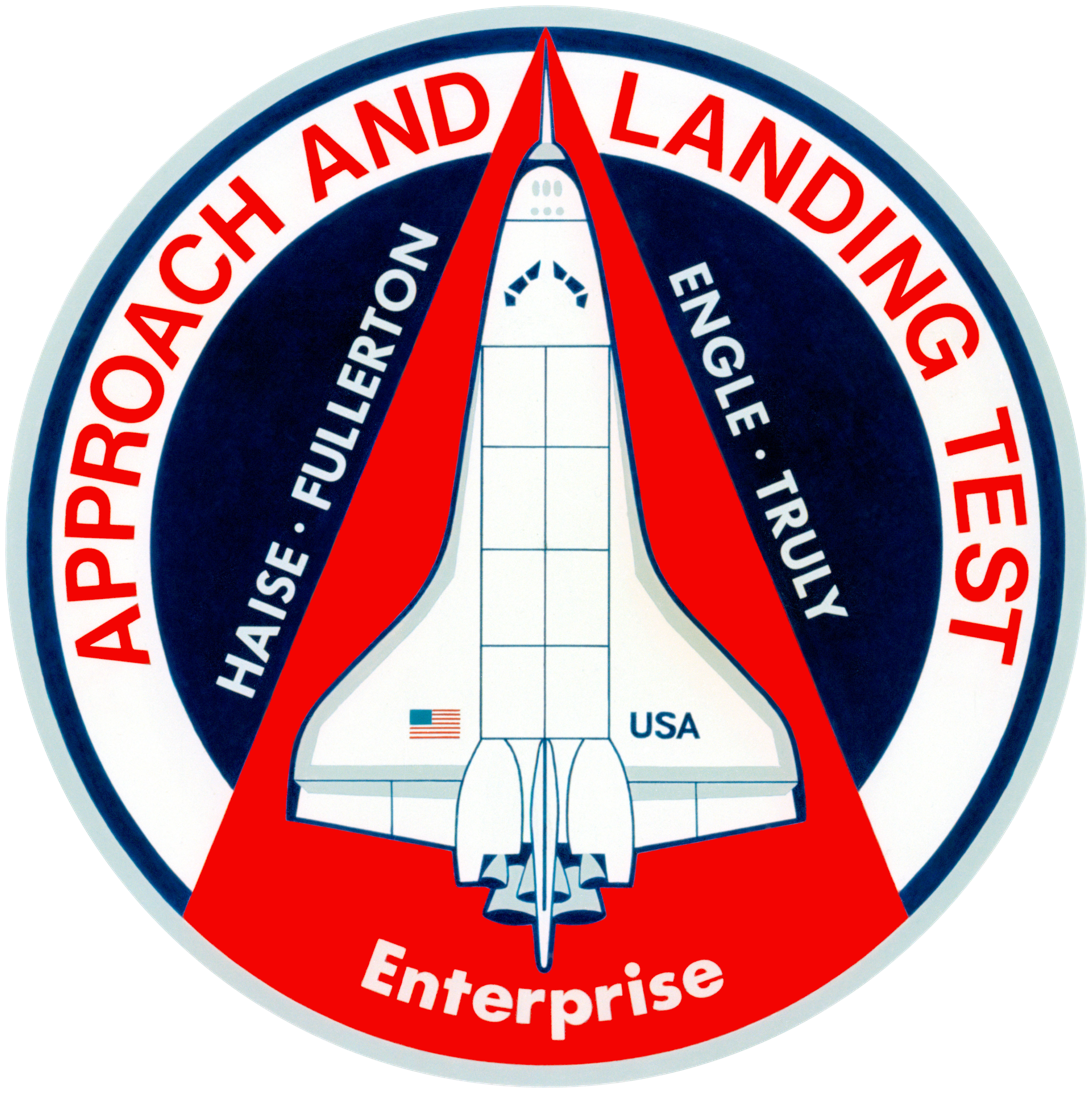
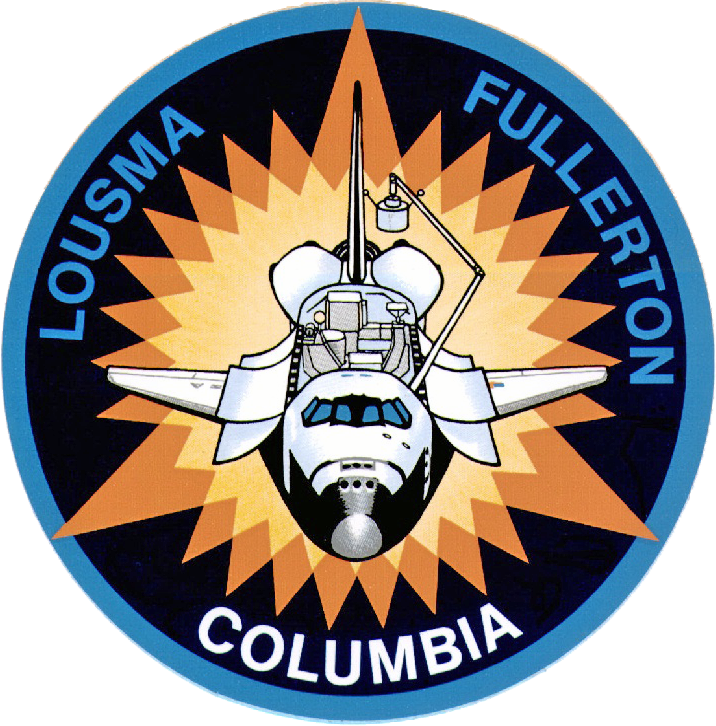
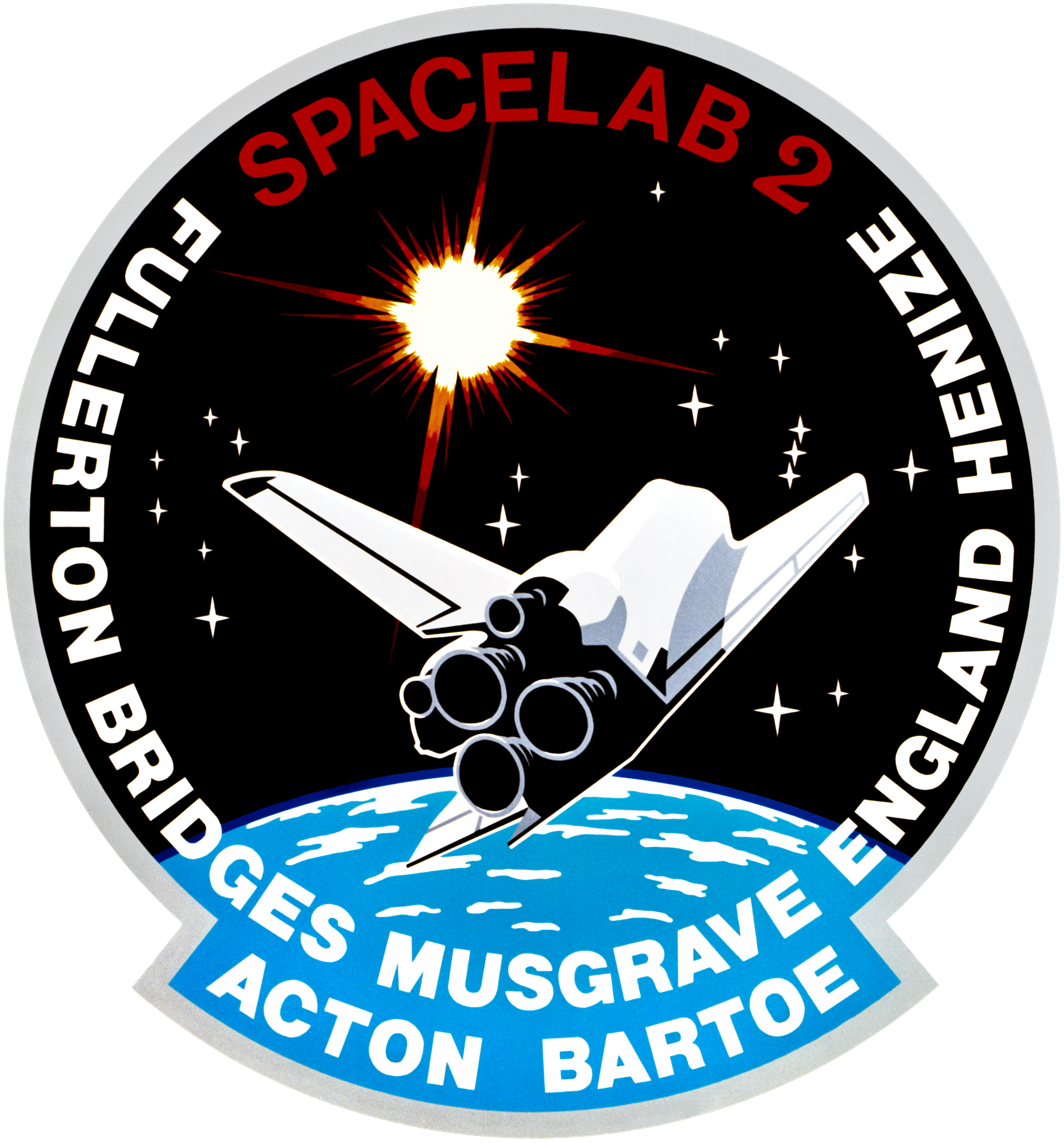
- Mission insignia
- Retired: December 31, 2007

Charles Gordon Fullerton (October 11, 1936 – August 21, 2013) was a United States Air Force colonel, a USAF and NASA astronaut, and a research pilot at NASA's Dryden Flight Research Facility, Edwards, California. His assignments included a variety of flight research and support activities piloting NASA's B-52 launch aircraft, the Boeing 747 Shuttle Carrier Aircraft (SCA), and other multi-engine and high performance aircraft.

Fullerton logged more than 380 hours in space flight, and was a NASA astronaut from September 1969 until November 1986 when he joined the research pilot office at Dryden. In July 1988, he completed a 30-year career with the U.S. Air Force and retired as a colonel. He continued in his position of NASA research pilot as a civilian. Fullerton, his wife, and their two children lived in Lancaster, California.

== Biography ==
=== Early years and education ===
Born October 11, 1936, in Rochester, New York, Fullerton graduated from Ulysses S. Grant High School, Portland, Oregon, in 1953. He received Bachelor of Science and Master of Science degrees in mechanical engineering from the California Institute of Technology, Pasadena, California, in 1957 and 1958, respectively.

=== Air Force career ===
Fullerton entered the U.S. Air Force in July 1958 after working as a mechanical design engineer for Hughes Aircraft Company, Culver City, California.

After primary and basic flight school, Fullerton was trained as an F-86 interceptor pilot, and later became a B-47 bomber pilot at Davis-Monthan Air Force Base, Arizona. In 1964 he was chosen to attend the Air Force Aerospace Research Pilot School (now the U.S. Air Force Test Pilot School), Edwards Air Force Base, California. Upon graduation he was assigned as a test pilot with the Bomber Operations Division at Wright-Patterson Air Force Base, Ohio. In 1966, Fullerton was selected for and served as a flight crew member for the Air Force Manned Orbiting Laboratory (MOL) program until its termination in 1969.

=== NASA career ===
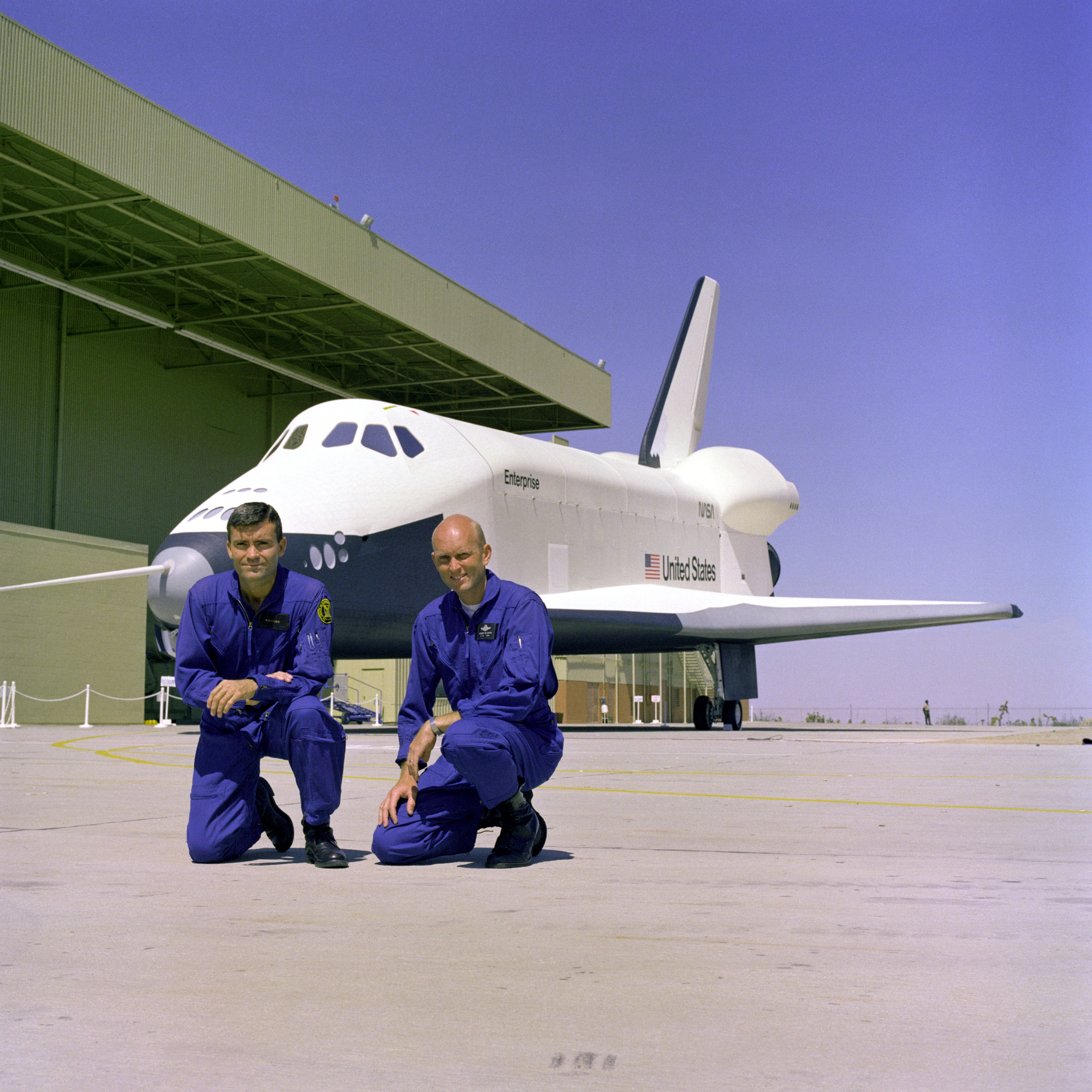
Fullerton (right) alongside Fred Haise, one of the ALT crews

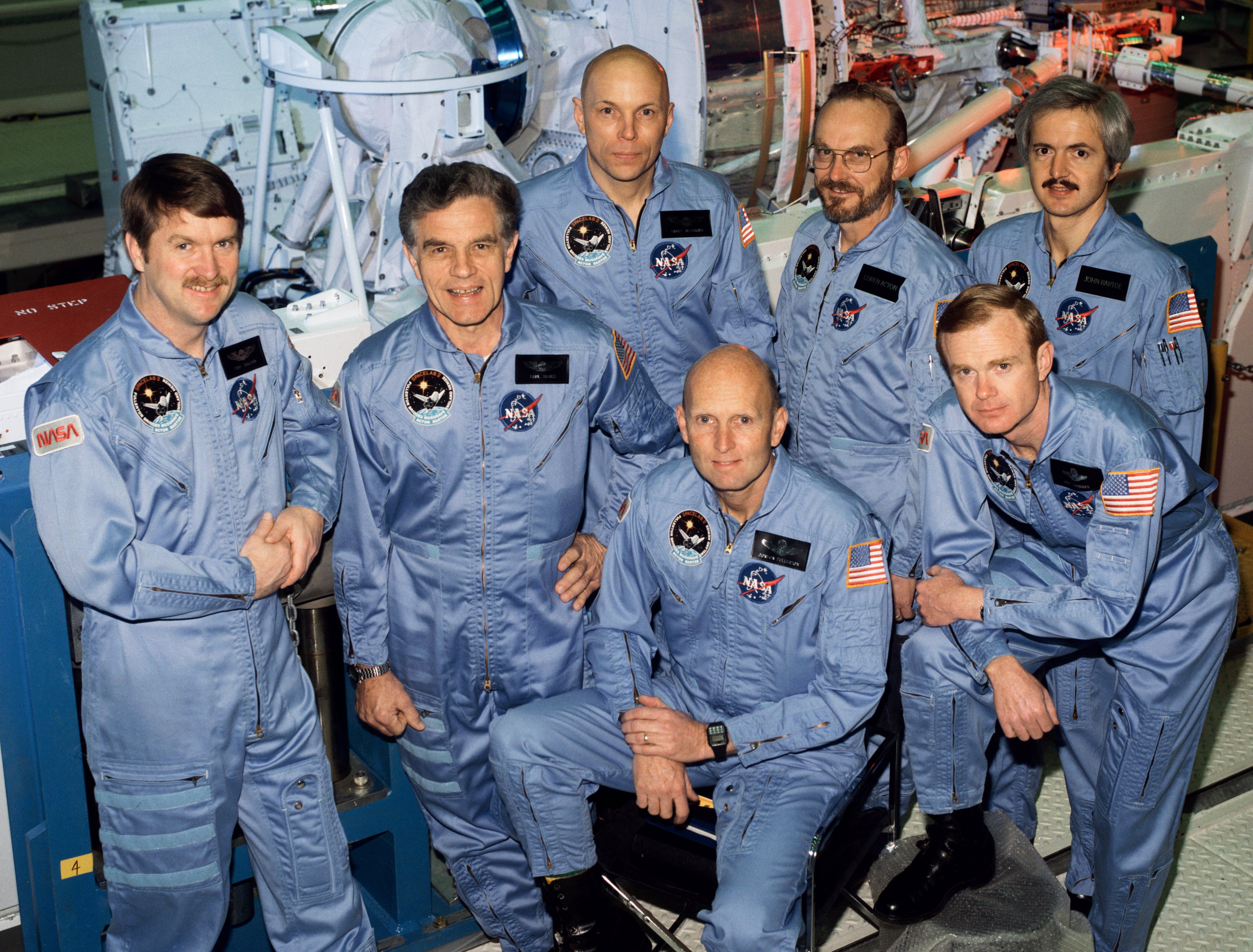
The crew of the STS-51-F mission with Fullerton seated in the foreground

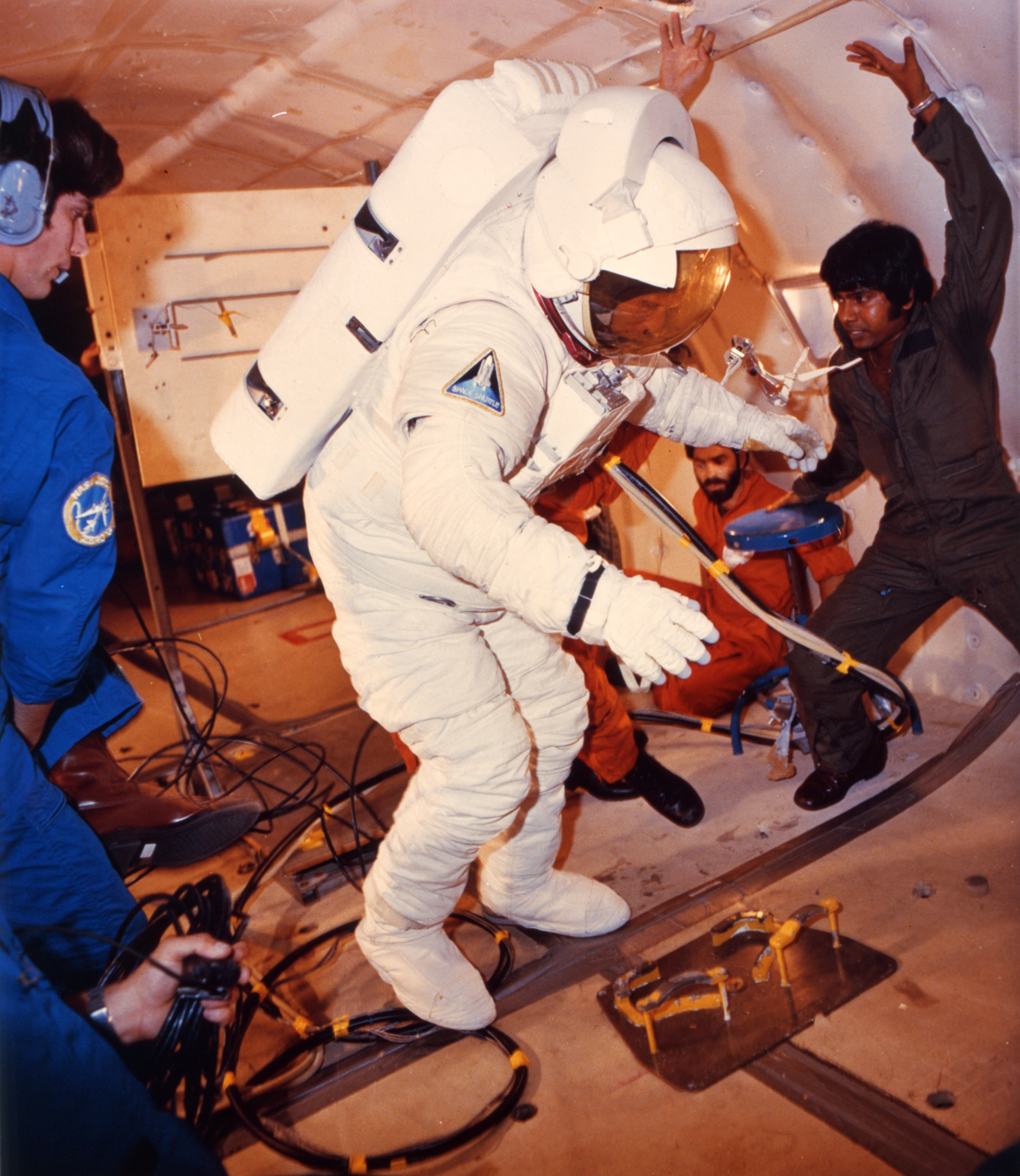
Fullerton (in spacesuit) training aboard a KC-135 "zero-gravity" aircraft in 1981

Fullerton was part of NASA Astronaut Group 7 in September 1969 after the cancellation of the MOL program. After assignment to the NASA Johnson Space Center as an astronaut, Fullerton served on the support crews for the Apollo 14, 15, 16, and 17 lunar missions.

In 1977, Fullerton was assigned to one of the two-man flight crews that piloted the Space Shuttle prototype Enterprise during the Approach and Landing Tests Program at Dryden that same year.

Fullerton was the pilot on the eight-day STS-3 Space Shuttle orbital flight test mission, March 22–30, 1982. Launched from the Kennedy Space Center, Florida, the mission exposed the orbiter Columbia to extremes in thermal stress and tested the 50-foot (15 m) Canadarm used to grapple and maneuver payloads to orbit. STS-3 landed at Northrup Strip, White Sands, New Mexico, because Rogers Dry Lake at Edwards AFB was wet due to heavy seasonal rains.

Fullerton was commander of the STS-51-F "Spacelab 2" mission, launched from Kennedy Space Center on July 29, 1985. This mission, with the orbiter Challenger, was the first pallet-only Spacelab mission and the first to operate the Spacelab Instrument Pointing System (IPS). It carried 13 major experiments in the fields of astronomy, solar physics, ionospheric science, life science, and a superfluid helium experiment. The mission ended August 6, 1985, with a landing at Edwards Air Force Base.

=== Research test pilot career ===
Fullerton served as project pilot on the NASA/Convair 990 aircraft, which had been modified as a Landing Systems Research Aircraft to test Space Shuttle landing gear components. Additionally, Fullerton was also project pilot on F-18 Systems Research Aircraft, a test bed to develop new flight control actuators, fiber optic control systems, and other advanced aircraft technology.

As the project pilot on the Propulsion Controlled Aircraft program, Fullerton successfully landed an F-15 and an MD-11 with all control surfaces fixed, using only engine thrust modulation for control.

In addition to these activities, Fullerton served as a project pilot on several other research programs at Dryden. Among them were the C-140 Jetstar Laminar Flow Control, F-111 Mission Adaptive Wing, F-14 Variable Sweep Flow Transition, Space Shuttle orbiter drag chute and F-111 crew module parachute tests with the B-52, and X-29 vortex flow control. As project pilot on the B-52 launch aircraft, Fullerton was involved in tests to develop a new F-111 crew module recovery system. He also flew the B-52 for the first six mid-air launchings of the commercially developed Pegasus space vehicle.

Fullerton was one of two NASA pilots who flew the Russian-built Tu-144LL supersonic aircraft used in a joint high speed research program.

With over 16,000 hours of flying time, Fullerton piloted 135 different types of aircraft, including full qualification in the T-33, T-34, T-37, T-39, F-86, F-101, F-106, F-111, F-14, X-29, KC-135, C-140, and B-47. After joining Dryden as a research pilot, Fullerton piloted nearly all the research and support aircraft flown at the facility, including the T-38, F-18, F-15, B-52, NASA/Convair 990, 747 Shuttle Carrier Aircraft, and the DC-8.

=== Later years and death ===
Fullerton retired in 2007. He suffered a stroke in 2009 and was cared for in a facility in Lancaster, California, where he died from complications on August 21, 2013, aged 76.

== Awards and honors ==
=== Military and government awards ===
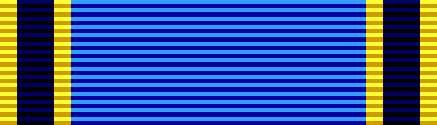
Defense Distinguished Service Medal
Defense Superior Service Medal
Distinguished Flying Cross
NASA Distinguished Service Medal
NASA Exceptional Service Medal
NASA Space Flight Medal (1983 and 1985)

=== Other awards and honors ===
- Iven C. Kincheloe Award from the Society of Experimental Test Pilots, 1978
- U.S. Astronaut Hall of Fame, 2005 inductee
- General Thomas D. White Space Trophy, 1977
- Haley Space Flight Award from the American Institute of Aeronautics and Astronautics
- Golden Plate Award of the American Academy of Achievement, 1982
- Certificate of Achievement Award from the Soaring Society of America
- Ray E. Tenhoff Award from the Society of Experimental Test Pilots in 1992 and 1993.
- Fellow of the Society of Experimental Test Pilots
- Member, Tau Beta Pi
- Honorary member of the National World War II Glider Pilot Association
- Fellow of the American Astronautical Society

Fullerton was inducted with Lousma into the International Space Hall of Fame during a ceremony with the governor of New Mexico in 1982 for their involvement in the STS-3 mission. The governor also presented them with the International Space Hall of Fame's Pioneer Award, and were the second group to receive this award.

== Sources ==
- Biography of C. Gordon Fullerton
