= James M. Taylor =

American astronaut and test pilot (1930–1970)

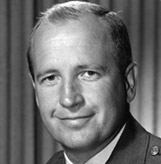
- Born: November 27, 1930; Stamps, Arkansas, U.S.
- Died: September 4, 1970 (aged 39); Palmdale, California, U.S.
- Education: University of Michigan, B.S. 1959
- Occupation: Test pilot
- Space career

USAF astronaut
- Rank: Lieutenant colonel, USAF
- Selection: 1965 USAF MOL Group 1
- Missions: None
- Retired: 1969

James Martin Taylor (November 27, 1930 – September 4, 1970) was a United States Air Force astronaut and test pilot. Although he trained for the USAF Manned Orbital Laboratory (MOL), the program was cancelled before any of the MOL crews reached space.

Taylor was born November 27, 1930, in Stamps, Arkansas, and graduated from University of Michigan with a Bachelor of Science degree in electrical engineering in 1959. He joined the USAF and trained as a test pilot, graduating from the U.S. Air Force Test Pilot School in class 63A and MOL. In 1965, he was selected as one of the first astronauts to the Air Force's classified Manned Orbital Laboratory. The MOL program, canceled in 1969 before sending any astronauts into space, was to provide a military space station with Air Force astronauts using a modified Gemini spacecraft. The history of the MOL program was presented in the Public Television series NOVA episode called Astrospies which first aired February 12, 2008.

To be in MOL, you had to be smart and you had to be a leader. To me, Jimmy was among the best in both categories.

— Richard H. Truly, describing his MOL colleague.

After the MOL program cancellation, Taylor continued his USAF career as an instructor at the Test Pilot School and served as deputy commandant. On September 4, 1970, he and a French Air Force exchange test pilot trainee, Pierre J. du Bucq, were killed when their T-38 aircraft crashed during a training mission at Palmdale Regional Airport. The crash was caused by severe wake turbulence from a C-141 that was performing touch-and-goes on an intersecting runway. At the time of his death, Taylor held the rank of lieutenant colonel. In memory of Taylor, the Test Pilot School presented the James M. Taylor Award to the outstanding graduate of the Experimental Test Pilot Course (Phase 1). The award was discontinued after class 71B when the school's curriculum was revised to eliminate the Phase I and II designation.

Attended by his fellow MOL astronauts, Taylor was buried at McChord Air Force Base in Pierce County, Washington. He is survived by his wife, Jacquelyn, and three children.
