= STS-6 =

1983 American crewed spaceflight and maiden flight of Space Shuttle Challenger

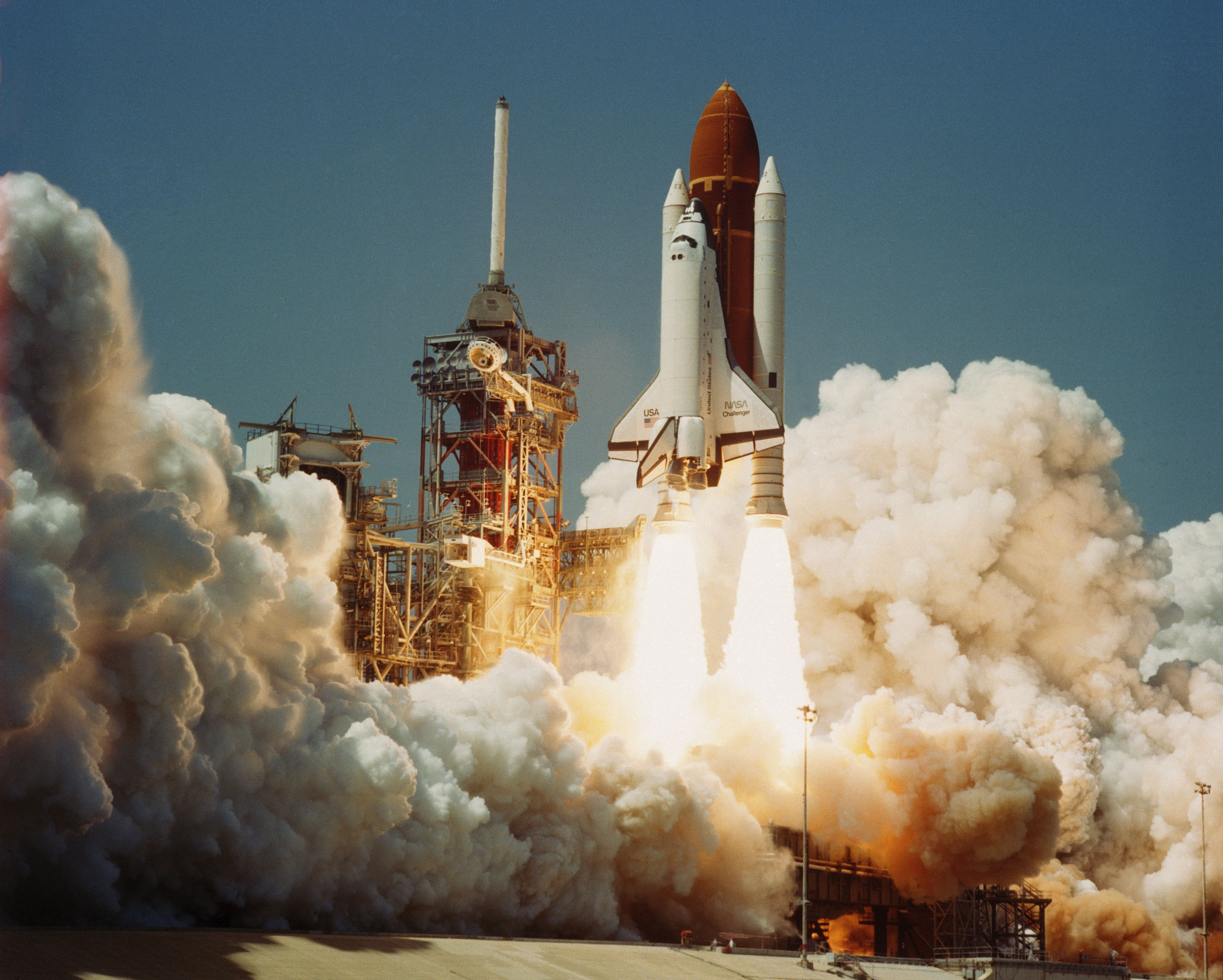
- Maiden launch of Challenger, April 4, 1983
- Names: Space Transportation System-6
- Mission type: TDRS-1 satellite deployment
- Operator: NASA
- COSPAR ID: 1983-026A
- SATCAT no.: 13968
- Mission duration: 5 days, 23 minutes, 42 seconds
- Distance travelled: 3,370,437 km (2,094,292 mi)
- Orbits completed: 81

Spacecraft properties
- Spacecraft: Space Shuttle Challenger
- Launch mass: 116,457 kg (256,744 lb)
- Landing mass: 86,330 kg (190,330 lb)
- Payload mass: 21,305 kg (46,969 lb)

Crew
- Crew size: 4
- Members: Paul J. Weitz; Karol J. Bobko; Story Musgrave; Donald H. Peterson
- EVAs: 1
- EVA duration: 4 hours, 17 minutes

Start of mission
- Launch date: April 4, 1983, 18:30:00 UTC (1:30 pm EST)
- Launch site: Kennedy, LC-39A
- Contractor: Rockwell International

End of mission
- Landing date: April 9, 1983, 18:53:42 UTC (10:53:42 am PST)
- Landing site: Edwards, Runway 22

Orbital parameters
- Reference system: Geocentric orbit
- Regime: Low Earth orbit
- Perigee altitude: 288 km (179 mi)
- Apogee altitude: 295 km (183 mi)
- Inclination: 28.50°
- Period: 90.40 minutes
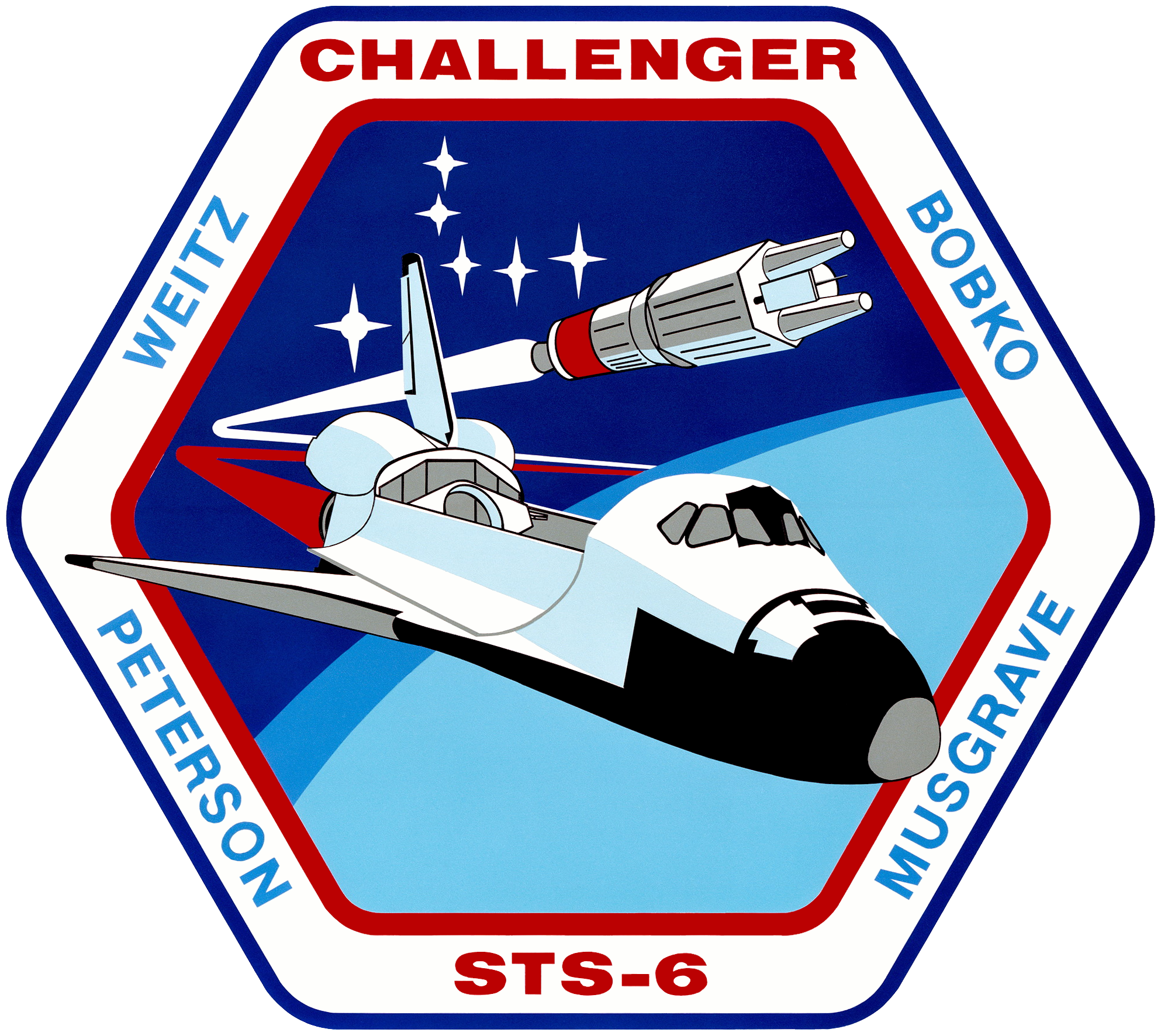
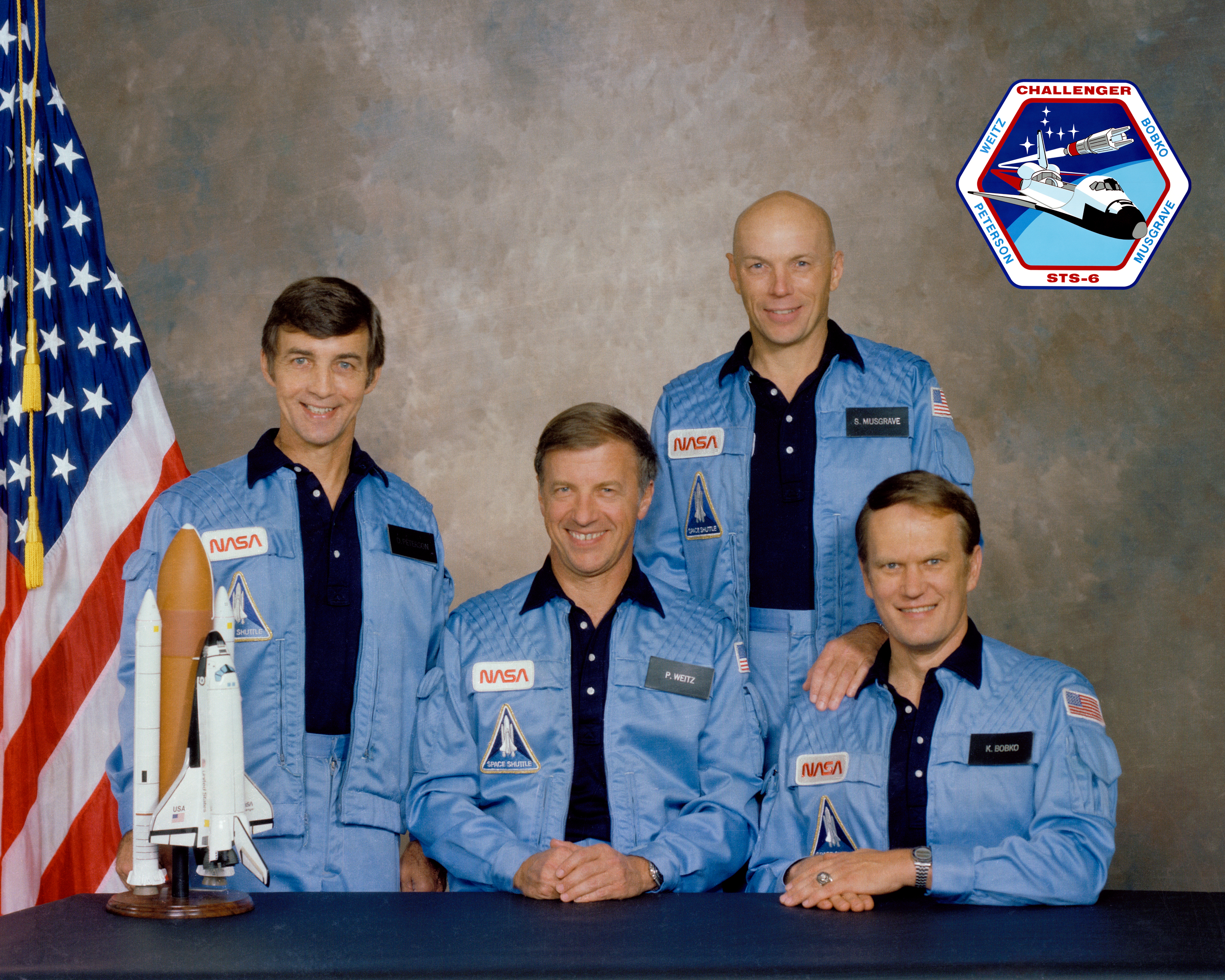
- STS-6 mission patch From left: Peterson, Weitz, Musgrave and Bobko Space Shuttle program

STS-6 was the sixth NASA Space Shuttle mission and the maiden flight of the Space Shuttle Challenger. Launched from Kennedy Space Center on April 4, 1983, the mission deployed the first Tracking and Data Relay Satellite, TDRS-1, into orbit, before landing at Edwards Air Force Base on April 9, 1983. STS-6 was the first Space Shuttle mission during which a Extravehicular activity was conducted, and hence was the first in which the Extravehicular Mobility Unit (EMU) was used.

== Crew ==
Position	Astronaut
Commander	Paul J. Weitz; Second and last spaceflight
Pilot	Karol J. Bobko; First spaceflight
Mission Specialist 1	F. Story Musgrave; First spaceflight
Mission Specialist 2 Flight Engineer	Donald H. Peterson; Only spaceflight
STS-6 was the last shuttle mission with a four-person crew until STS-135, the final shuttle mission, which launched on July 8, 2011.

Commander Paul Weitz had previously served as Pilot on the first Skylab crewed mission (Skylab-2), where he lived and worked in Skylab for nearly a month from May to June 1973. After Skylab, Weitz became the Deputy Chief of the Astronaut Office under Chief Astronaut John Young. Bobko originally became an astronaut for the Air Force's Manned Orbiting Laboratory (MOL) program but later joined NASA in 1969 after the MOL program's cancellation. Prior to STS-6 he participated in the Skylab Medical Experiment Altitude Test (SMEAT) and worked as a member of the support crew for the Apollo-Soyuz Test Project (ASTP).

Peterson was also a transfer from the MOL program, and was a member of the support crew for Apollo 16. Musgrave joined NASA in 1967 as part of the second scientist-astronaut group, and was the backup Science Pilot for the first Skylab mission. He also participated in the design of the equipment that he and Peterson used during their EVA on the STS-6 mission.

=== Support crew ===
- Roy D. Bridges Jr. (entry CAPCOM)
- Mary L. Cleave
- Richard O. Covey (ascent CAPCOM)
- Guy Gardner
- Jon McBride
- Bryan D. O'Connor

=== Spacewalk ===
- Personnel: Musgrave and Peterson
- Date: April 7–8, 1983 (21:03–01:20 UTC)
- Duration: 4 hours, 17 minutes

=== Crew seat assignments ===
Seat	Launch	Landing	Seats 1–4 are on the flight deck. Seats 5–7 are on the mid-deck.
1	Weitz		Seats 1–4 are on the flight deck. Seats 5–7 are on the mid-deck.
2	Bobko		Seats 1–4 are on the flight deck. Seats 5–7 are on the mid-deck.
3	Musgrave		Seats 1–4 are on the flight deck. Seats 5–7 are on the mid-deck.
4	Peterson		Seats 1–4 are on the flight deck. Seats 5–7 are on the mid-deck.
5	Unused		Seats 1–4 are on the flight deck. Seats 5–7 are on the mid-deck.
6	Unused		Seats 1–4 are on the flight deck. Seats 5–7 are on the mid-deck.
7	Unused		Seats 1–4 are on the flight deck. Seats 5–7 are on the mid-deck.

== Mission background ==
1983 NASA documentary of the Space Shuttle Challenger first maiden flight and the deployment of the TRDS-1 satellite.

The new orbiter was rolled out to LC-39A in December 8, 1982. On December 18, 1982, Challenger was given a PFRF (Pre Flight Readiness Firing) to verify the operation of the main engines. The PFRF lasted for 16 seconds. Although engine operation was generally satisfactory, telemetry data indicated significant leakage of liquid hydrogen in the thrust section. However, it was not possible to determine the location of the leak with certainty, so program directors decided on a second PFRF with added telemetry probes. It was known that during the test run on December 18, 1982, that recirculated exhaust gases and vibration leaked into the thrust section and this was considered a potential cause of the leak. Therefore, the original planned launch in late January 1983 had to be postponed.

On January 25, 1983, a second PFRF was conducted which lasted 23 seconds and exhibited more hydrogen leaks. Eventually, it was found that low pressure ducting in the No. 1 engine was cracked. The engine was replaced by a spare, which was found to also have leaks. A third engine had to be ordered from Rocketdyne, and after thorough testing, turned out to be in proper operating condition. The No. 2 and No. 3 engines turned out to have leaks as well, and were taken out of the orbiter for repairs. By mid-March, the engine problems had been completely resolved.

While the engine repairs were underway on February 28, 1983, a severe storm caused contamination of the mission's primary cargo, the first Tracking and Data Relay Satellite-A (TDRS-1), while it was in the Payload Changeout Room on the Rotating Service Structure at the launch pad. Consequently, the satellite had to be taken back to its checkout facility, where it was cleaned and rechecked. The Payload Changeout Room and the payload bay also had to be cleaned. All of these events pushed the launch back from March 26, 1983, to early April 1983.

== Mission summary ==
On April 4, 1983, STS-6, the first mission of the orbiter Challenger, lifted off from Launch Complex 39A at the Kennedy Space Center at 18:30:00 UTC (1:30 pm EST, local time at the launch site). It marked the first use of a new lightweight external tank and lightweight Space Shuttle Solid Rocket Booster (SRB) casings, first use of the head-up display, and first extravehicular activity (EVA) in the Space Shuttle program.

STS-6 carried a crew of four – Commander Paul J. Weitz, Pilot Karol J. Bobko, Mission Specialist F. Story Musgrave and Mission Specialist Donald H. Peterson. Using new spacesuits designed specifically for the Space Shuttle program, Musgrave and Peterson successfully accomplished the program's first extravehicular activity (EVA) on April 7–8, 1983, performing various tests in the orbiter's payload bay. Their spacewalk lasted 4 hours and 17 minutes and was the first American EVA since the last of Skylab 4's four EVAs nearly a decade prior.

Although the 2,300 kg (5,100 lb) TDRS-A satellite was successfully deployed from Challenger, its two-stage booster rocket, the Inertial Upper Stage (IUS), tumbled out of control, placing the satellite into a low elliptical orbit. However, the satellite contained extra propellant beyond what was needed for its attitude control thrusters, and during the next several months, its thrusters were fired at carefully planned intervals, gradually moving TDRS-1 into its geosynchronous operating orbit, thus saving the US$100-million satellite. Other STS-6 payloads included three Getaway Special (GAS) canisters and the continuation of the Mono-disperse Latex Reactor and Continuous Flow Electrophoresis experiments.

Challenger returned to Earth on April 9, 1983, coming to a stop on Runway 22 at Edwards Air Force Base at 18:53:42 UTC (10:53:42 a.m. PST, local time at the landing site). During the mission, it completed 81 orbits, traveling 3,200,000 km (2,000,000 mi; 1,700,000 nmi) in 5 days, 23 minutes, and 42 seconds. It was flown back to KSC on April 16, 1983.

== Mission insignia ==
The six white stars in the upper blue field of the mission patch, and its hexagonal shape, indicate the flight's numerical designation in the Space Transportation System's mission sequence.

== Wake-up calls ==
NASA began a tradition of playing music to astronauts during the Project Gemini, and first used music to wake up a flight crew during Apollo 15. Each track is specially chosen, often by the astronauts' families, and usually has a special meaning to an individual member of the crew, or is applicable to their daily activities.

Flight Day	Song	Artist/Composer
Day 2	"Cadets on Parade"	Air Force Academy Band
Day 3	"Teach Me Tiger"	April Stevens
Day 4	"Theme from F Troop"	William Lava
Day 5	"The Poor Co-pilot"	Oscar Brand
Day 6	"Ode to the Lions"	Rusty Gordon

== Gallery ==
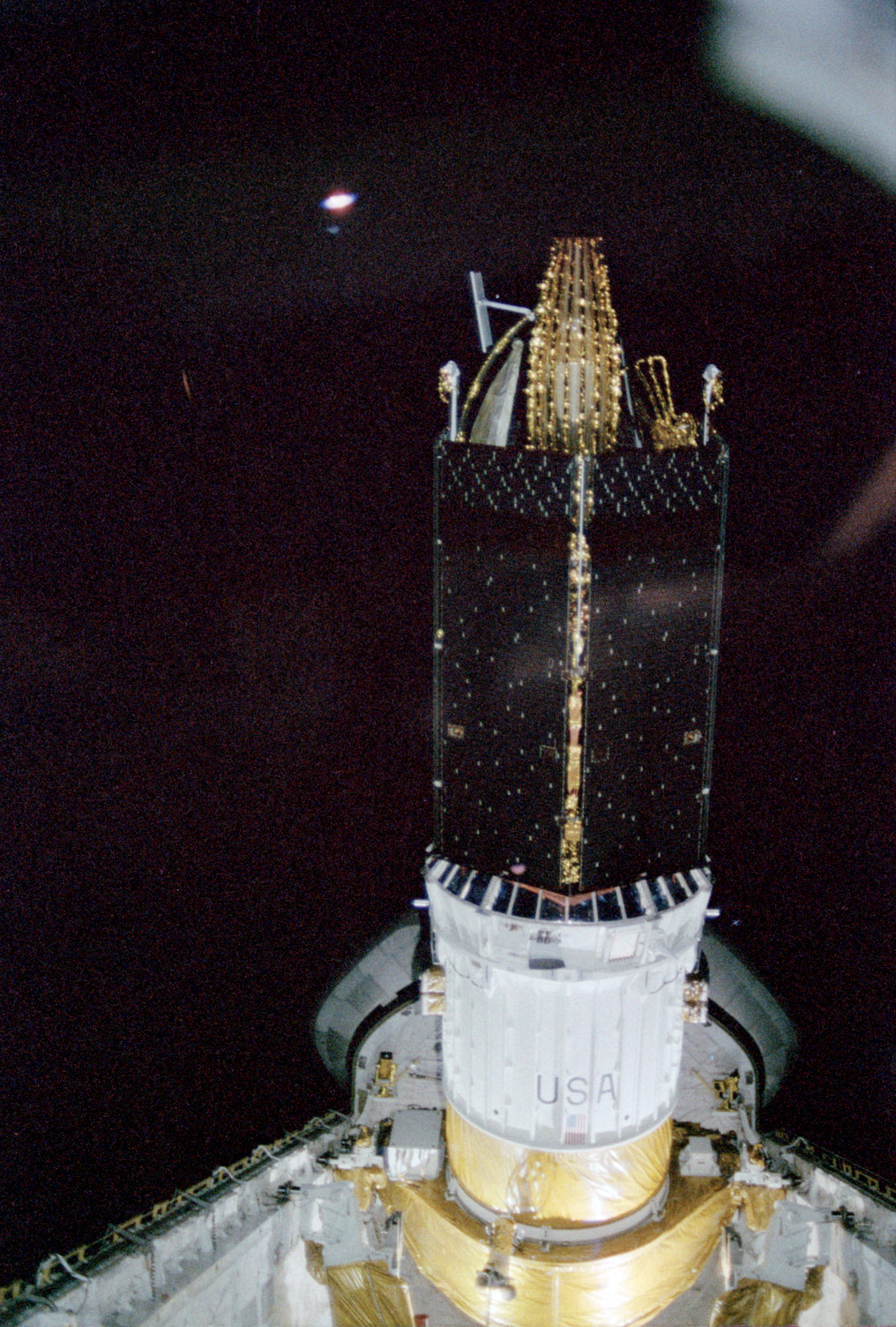
TDRS-A is deployed.

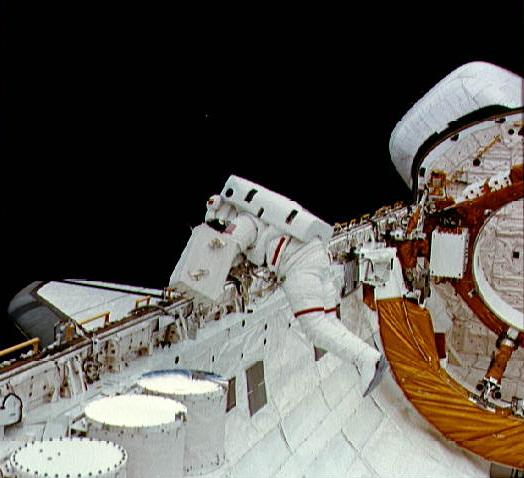
Musgrave during the EVA

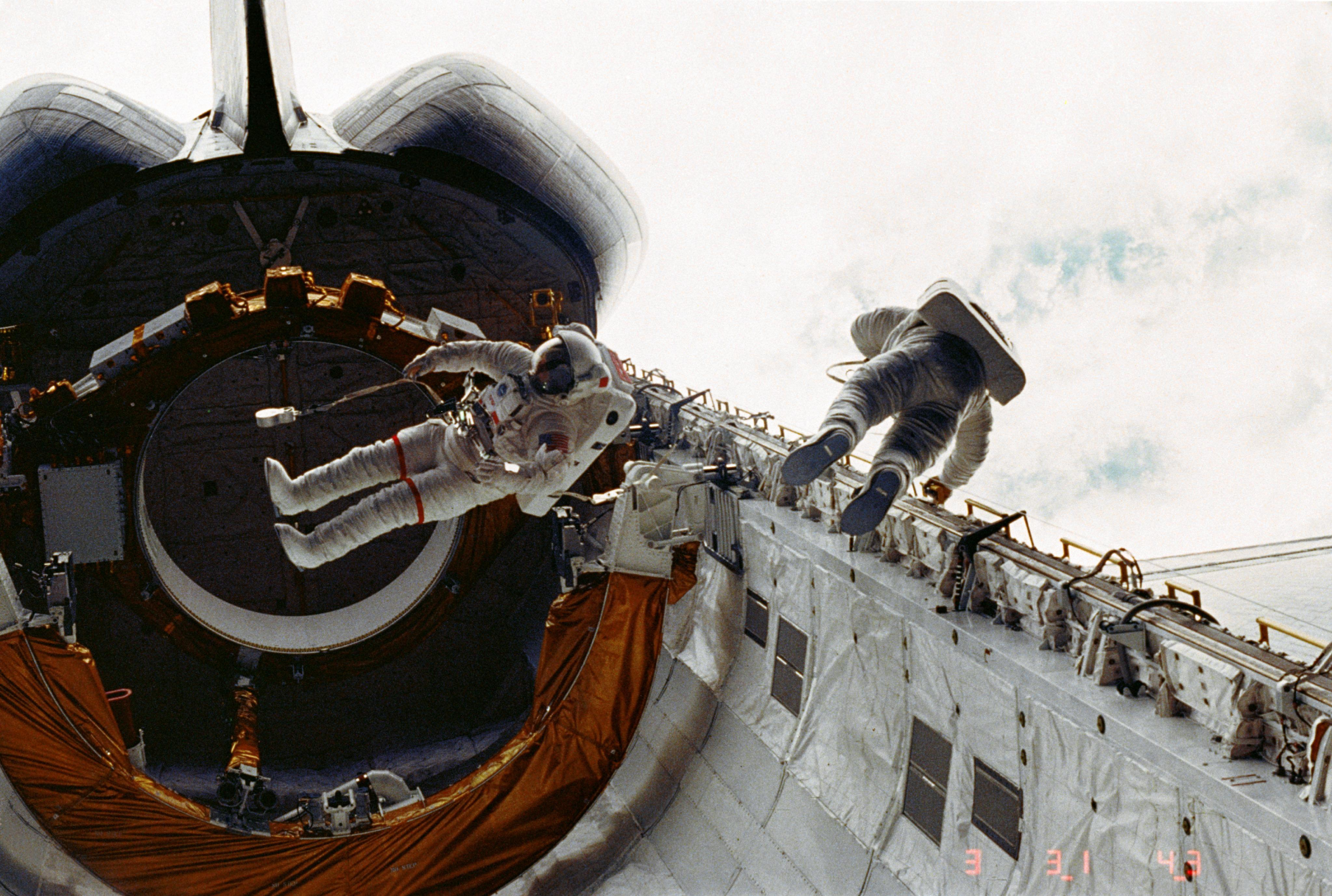
Musgrave, left, and Peterson float in Challenger's payload bay during the EVA.

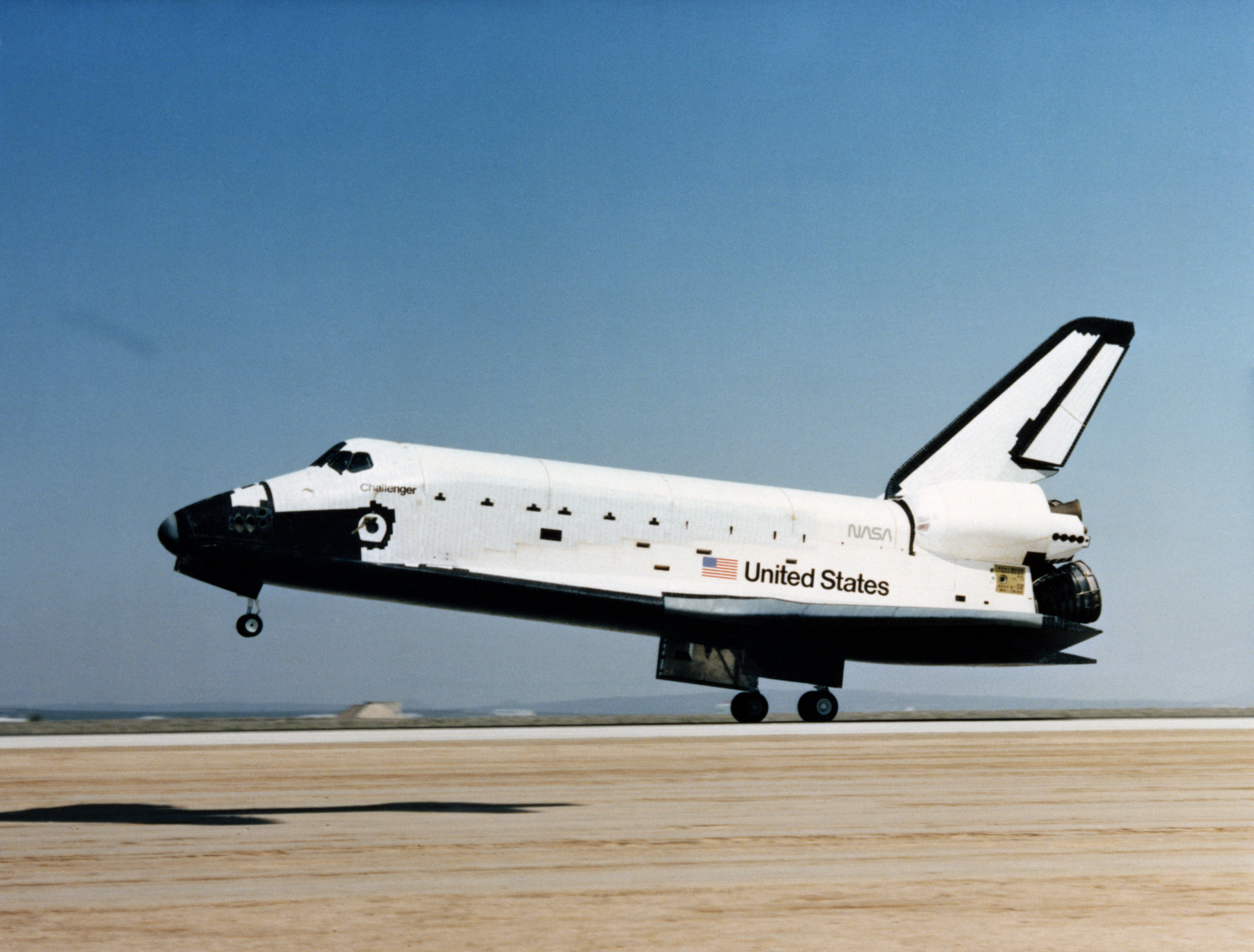
Challenger lands at Edwards Air Force Base on 9 April 1983.

== See also ==
- List of human spaceflights
- List of Space Shuttle missions
- Lists of spacewalks and moonwalks
