= Karol J. Bobko =

American astronaut (1937–2023)

Bo Bobko
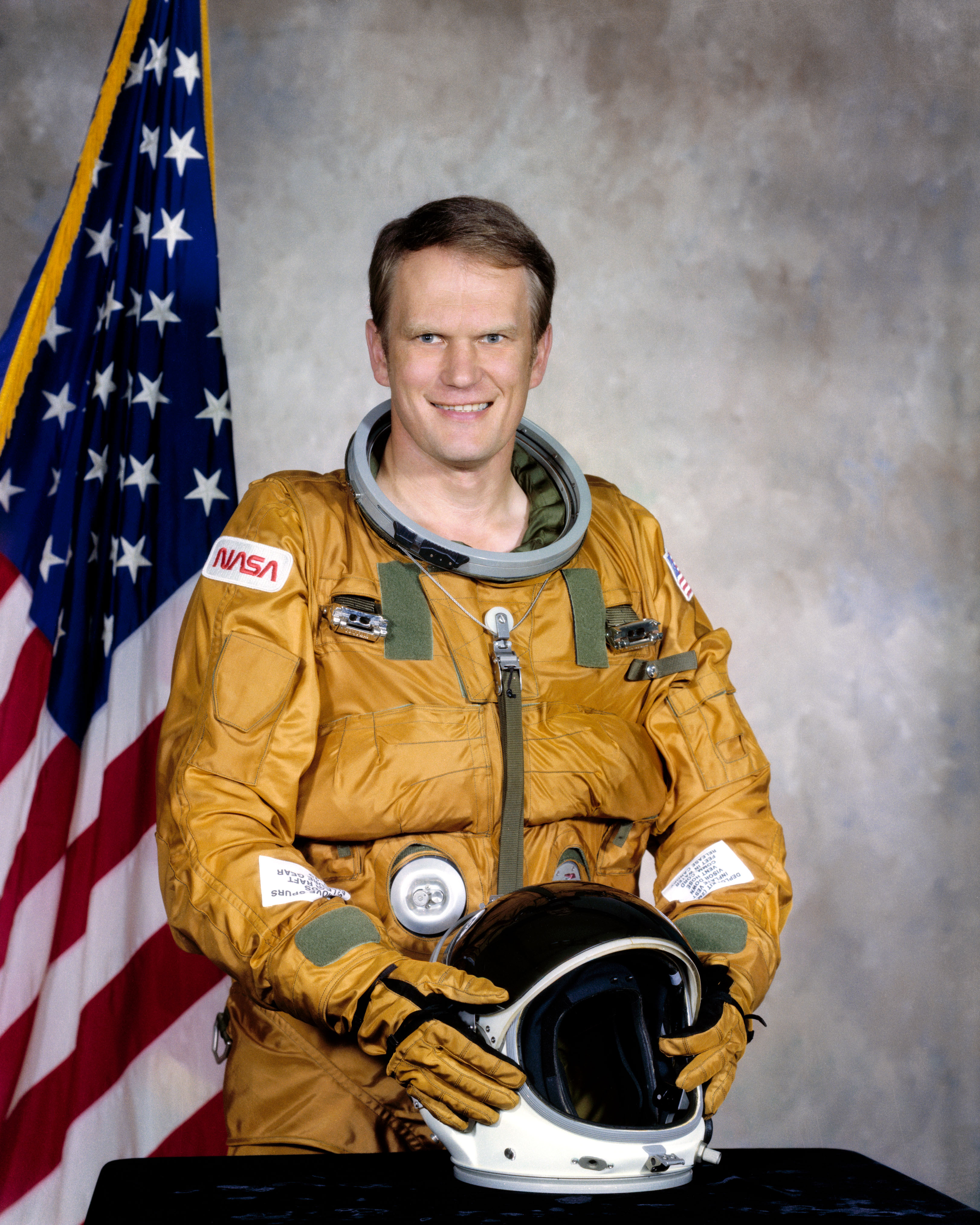
- Bobko in 1979
- Born: Karol Joseph Bobko; December 23, 1937; New York City, U.S.
- Died: August 17, 2023 (aged 85); Half Moon Bay, California, U.S.
- Education: United States Air Force Academy (BS); University of Southern California (MS)
- Awards: Distinguished Flying Cross
- Space career

NASA astronaut
- Rank: Colonel, USAF
- Time in space: 16d 2h 3m
- Selection: USAF MOL Group 2 (1966); NASA Group 7 (1969)
- Missions: STS-6; STS-51-D; STS-51-J
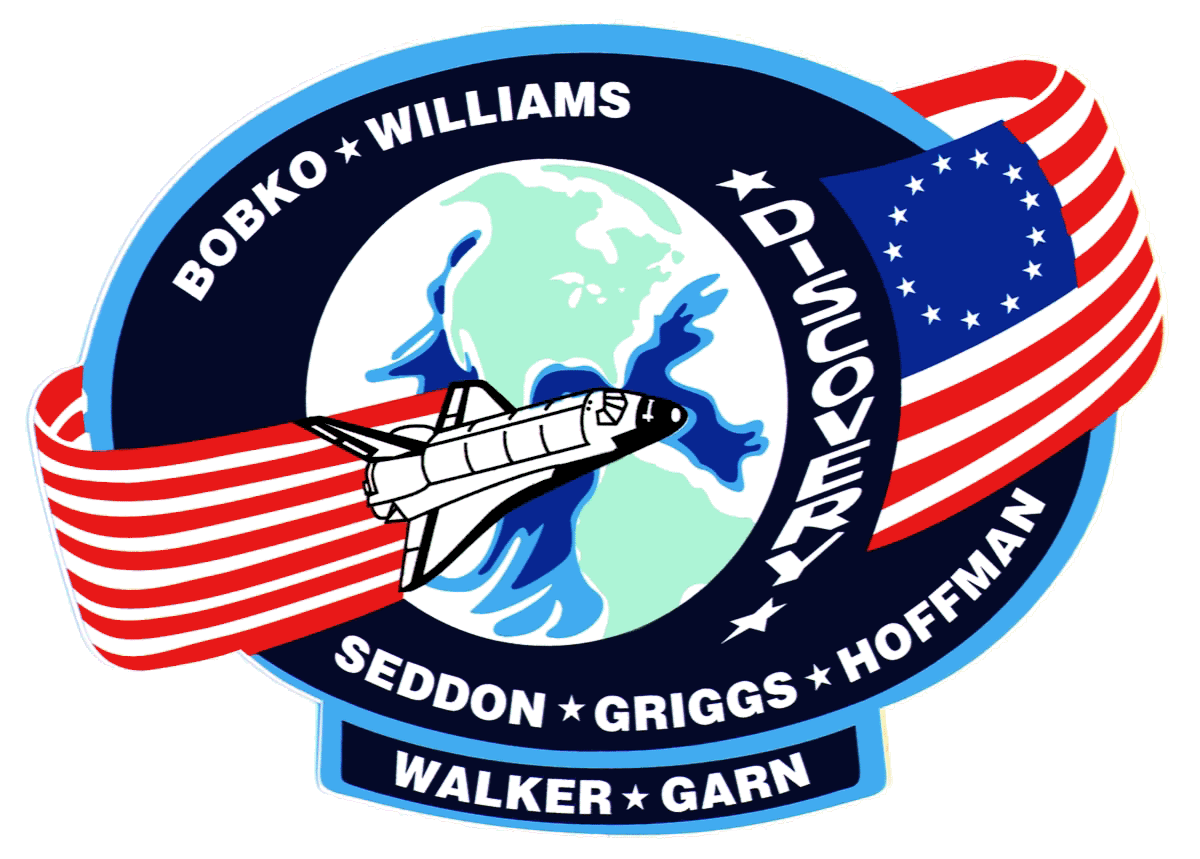
- Mission insignia
- Retired: January 1, 1989

Karol Joseph "Bo" Bobko (December 23, 1937 – August 17, 2023) was an American aerospace engineer, U.S. Air Force officer, test pilot, and a USAF and NASA astronaut. Bobko was the first graduate of the U.S. Air Force Academy to travel in space and the first person to fly on three different space shuttles across three different missions: STS-6, STS-51-D, STS-51-J.

== Early life and education ==
Bobko was born on December 23, 1937, in Manhattan, New York, to a family with Polish and Lithuanian roots. He grew up in Cambria Heights, Queens and Seaford, New York.

He graduated from Brooklyn Technical High School in 1955 before receiving a Bachelor of Science degree from the United States Air Force Academy in 1959. In 1970, he earned a Master of Science degree in aerospace engineering from the University of Southern California.

== Military service ==
Bobko was a member of the first graduating class of the U.S. Air Force Academy. Subsequent to receiving his commission and navigator rating, he attended pilot training at Bartow Air Base, Florida, and Vance Air Force Base, Oklahoma. He completed his flight training and received his pilot wings in 1960.

From 1961 to 1965, he flew F-100 and F-105 aircraft while assigned as a pilot with the 523d Tactical Fighter Squadron at Cannon Air Force Base, New Mexico, and the 336th Tactical Fighter Squadron at Seymour Johnson Air Force Base, North Carolina. He attended the Aerospace Research Pilot School at Edwards Air Force Base, California, and was assigned as an astronaut to the USAF Manned Orbiting Laboratory (MOL) program in 1966.

Bobko logged over 6,600 hours flight time in the F-100, F-104, F-105, T-33, T-38, and other aircraft.

== NASA career ==
Bobko became part of NASA Astronaut Group 7 in September 1969 after the cancellation of the Manned Orbiting Laboratory (MOL) program. He was a crewmember on the highly successful Skylab Medical Experiment Altitude Test (SMEAT) – a 56-day ground simulation of the Skylab mission, enabling crewmen to collect medical experiments baseline data and evaluate equipment, operations and procedures.

Bobko was a member of the astronaut support crew for the Apollo–Soyuz Test Project (ASTP). This historic first international crewed space flight was completed in July 1975. Subsequently, he was a member of the support crew for the Space Shuttle Approach and Landing Tests conducted at Edwards Air Force Base. He served alternately as CAPCOM and prime chase pilot during these Approach and Landing Test (ALT) flights.

In preparation for the first flight of Columbia (STS-1) Bobko served as the lead astronaut in the test and checkout group at Kennedy Space Center.

A veteran of three space flights, Bobko logged a total of 386 hours in space. He was the first graduate of the US Air Force Academy to travel in space and the first astronaut to fly on three different shuttle missions. He was the pilot on STS-6 (April 4–9, 1983); and was the mission commander on STS-51-D (April 12–19, 1985) and STS-51-J (October 3–7, 1985).

=== Spaceflight experience ===
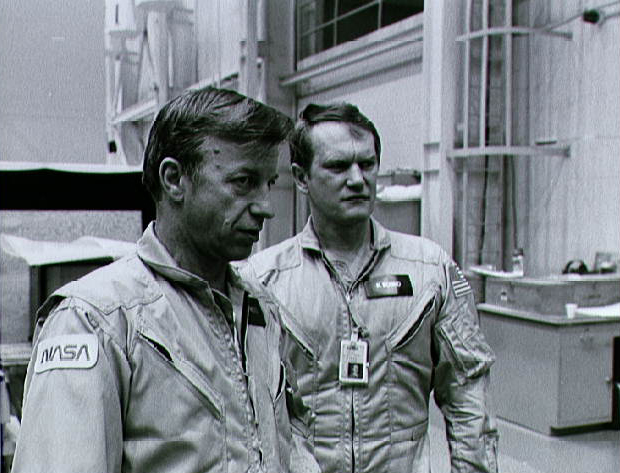
Bobko with fellow astronaut Paul J. Weitz (left) during training for STS-6

Bobko was pilot for STS-6, which launched from Kennedy Space Center in Florida, on April 4, 1983. During the maiden voyage of Challenger, the crew deployed a large communications satellite (TDRS-1) and the rocket stage (Inertial Upper Stage) required to boost it to geosynchronous orbit. The STS-6 crew also conducted the first Shuttle spacewalk (EVA) and additionally conducted numerous other experiments in materials processing and the recording of lightning activities from space. There were also three Getaway Specials activated on the flight. After 120 hours of orbital operations, Challenger landed on the concrete runway at Edwards Air Force Base in California, on April 9, 1983.

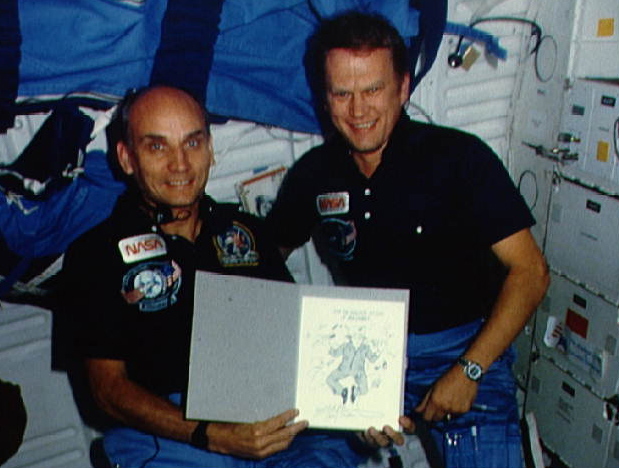
Bobko with U.S. Senator Jake Garn (left) during the STS-51-D mission

On his second mission, Bobko was the commander of STS-51-D which launched from Kennedy Space Center on April 12, 1985. The mission was to deploy two communications satellites, perform electrophoresis and echocardiograph operations in space, in addition to accomplishing other experiments. When one of the communications satellites malfunctioned, the first unscheduled spacewalk was made to activate the satellite which required rendezvous and operations with the remote manipulator arm. After 168 hours of orbital operations, Discovery landed on Runway 33 at Kennedy Space Center on April 19, 1985.

Bobko's final flight was as commander of STS-51-J, the second Space Shuttle Department of Defense mission, which launched from Kennedy Space Center on October 3, 1985. This mission carried classified payloads for the Department of Defense and was the second time that a Shuttle mission was used solely for Department of Defense activities. This was the maiden voyage of Atlantis. After 98 hours of orbital operations, Atlantis landed on Edwards Air Force Base Lakebed Runway 23 on October 7, 1985. Bobko became the first person to fly on three different Space Shuttles. He was the only astronaut to have flown on the maiden flights of two Space Shuttles.

== Post-NASA career ==
In 1988, Bobko retired from NASA and the Air Force to join the firm of Booz Allen Hamilton, in Houston, Texas. At Booz Allen he was a principal and managed efforts dealing with human space flight. His areas of emphasis were: high performance training simulation, hardware and software systems engineering, spacecraft checkout and testing, space station development and program integration.

In 2000, Bobko joined SPACEHAB, Inc. in Houston, Texas, where he was Vice President for Strategic Programs. He led an organization that develops concepts, processes and hardware for future spaceflight applications. In 2005, Bobko joined Science Applications International Corporation (SAIC) as Program Manager for the NASA Ames Research Center Simulation Laboratories (SimLabs) contract.

== Personal life and death ==
Bobko was married to F. Dianne Welsh and had a daughter and a son. He resided with his wife in Half Moon Bay, California.

Bobko died of complications of an unspecified degenerative disease of the nervous system in Half Moon Bay on August 17, 2023, at age 85.

== Awards and honors ==
- Defense Superior Service Medal
- Legion of Merit
- Distinguished Flying Cross
- Defense Meritorious Service Medal
- Meritorious Service Medals (2; 1970 and 1979)
- NASA Exceptional Service Medals (2)
- NASA Space Flight Medals (3)
- Johnson Space Center Group Achievement Awards (6)
- Air Force Academy Jabara Award (1983)
- Cradle of Aviation Museum Long Island Air & Space Hall of Fame
- U.S. Astronaut Hall of Fame (May 7, 2011).
- Fellow of the Society of Experimental Test Pilots (2020)
