= Richard H. Truly =

American astronaut and NASA administrator (1937–2024)

Richard Truly
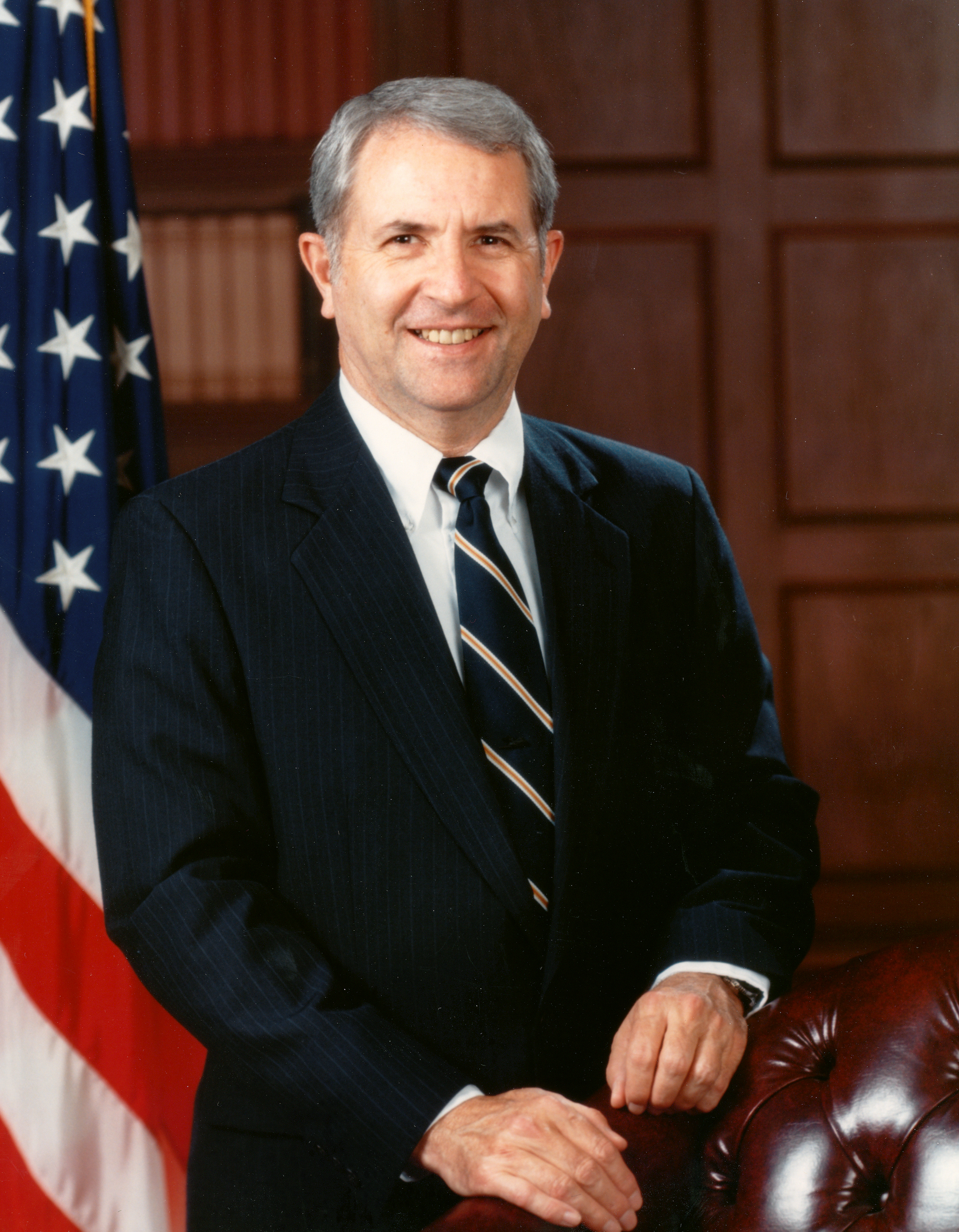

8th Administrator of the National Aeronautics and Space Administration
- In office July 1, 1989 – March 31, 1992
- President: George H. W. Bush
- Preceded by: James C. Fletcher
- Succeeded by: Daniel S. Goldin

Personal details
- Born: Richard Harrison Truly; November 12, 1937 Fayette, Mississippi, U.S.
- Died: February 27, 2024 (aged 86) Genesee, Colorado, U.S.
- Education: Georgia Institute of Technology (BS)

Military service
- Allegiance: United States
- Branch/service: United States Navy
- Years of service: 1959–1989
- Rank: Vice Admiral
- Commands: Fighter Squadron 33
- Awards: Legion of Merit; Defense Superior Service Medal; Distinguished Flying Cross; NASA Distinguished Service Medal

Astronaut career
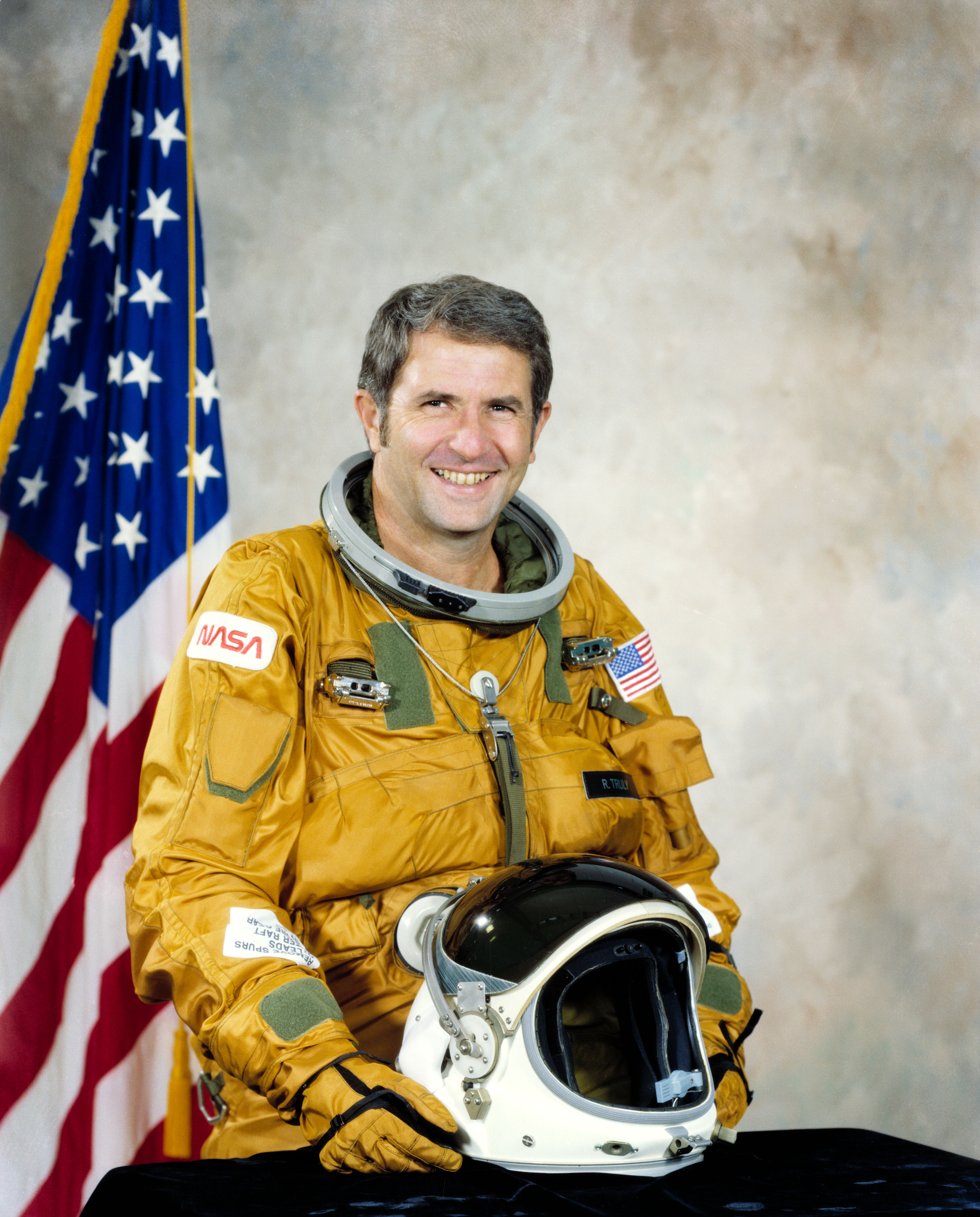
- Truly in October 1979
- Space career

NASA astronaut
- Time in space: 8d 7h 21m
- Selection: USAF MOL Group 1 (1965); NASA Group 7 (1969)
- Missions: ALT; STS-2; STS-8
- Retired: May 1992

Richard Harrison Truly (November 12, 1937 – February 27, 2024) was an American fighter pilot, engineer and Space Shuttle astronaut who served as a vice admiral in the United States Navy and as the eighth administrator of the National Aeronautics and Space Administration (NASA) from 1989 to 1992. He was the first former astronaut to head the space agency.

After his departure from NASA, he led the Georgia Tech Research Institute from 1992 to 1997, and the National Renewable Energy Laboratory from 1997 to 2005.

== Early life and education ==
Born November 12, 1937, in Fayette, Mississippi, Truly attended segregated schools in Fayette and Meridian, Mississippi. He received a Bachelor of Science degree in aeronautical engineering from Georgia Institute of Technology in 1959. He was a member of the Kappa Alpha Order. He was active in the Boy Scouts of America, achieving its highest rank of Eagle Scout.

Being a member of the Navy ROTC at Georgia Tech, Truly entered the U.S. Navy, where he was ordered to flight school and was designated a naval aviator on October 7, 1960. His initial tour of duty was in Fighter Squadron 33 (VF-33) where he flew F-8 Crusaders aboard USS Intrepid and USS Enterprise. He made more than 300 carrier landings.

From 1963 to 1965, Truly was first a student and later an instructor at the U.S. Air Force Aerospace Research Pilot School at Edwards Air Force Base, California.

== NASA career ==
In 1965, Truly was among the first military astronauts selected to the United States Air Force's Manned Orbiting Laboratory (MOL) program in Los Angeles, California. He joined NASA Astronaut Group 7 in August 1969 after the cancellation of the MOL program. At NASA, he was a member of the astronaut support crew and capsule communicator (CAPCOM) for all three of the crewed Skylab missions in 1973, and the Apollo–Soyuz mission in 1975. He flew twice on one of the two-man crews for the 1977 Approach and Landing Tests of the Space Shuttle Enterprise, and on the STS-2 mission in 1981, becoming the first man to be launched into space on his birthday. Truly then served as commander of STS-8 in 1983.

After STS-8, Truly left NASA to become the first commander of the Naval Space Command.

It's tough to describe how hard we all worked on MOL. But it was a huge part of our lives and, because of how hard we worked, we all learned a lot about ourselves and our abilities.

— Truly, describing his MOL experience.

=== Return to flight ===
Three weeks after the Space Shuttle Challenger disaster, Truly returned to NASA to become NASA's Associate Administrator for Space Flight on February 20, 1986. His primary task was to watch over the Space Shuttle's return to flight status. Along with that, he was also responsible for such long term issues as whether or not Challenger would be replaced, the role the Shuttle would play in the future and the mixture of expendable spacecraft and the shuttle for upcoming missions. While it only took a few days to determine the technical reason for the accident, sorting out the root cause was more difficult. In the end, it took Truly and NASA's "Return to Flight" program 31 months before the Space Shuttle Discovery successfully flew on September 29, 1988, with STS-26. In March 1986, Truly noted in a memo that there were several actions NASA needed to accomplish before launching another Shuttle flight. They included "Solid Rocket Motor joint redesign, Critical Items review, and Operations and Maintenance Instructions review".

=== NASA Administrator ===
Truly retired from the Navy as a vice admiral shortly before becoming NASA administrator. He was named to head NASA as its eighth administrator in May 1989, the first astronaut to do so. He held this position until May 1992. He was credited by Carl Sagan with interceding in an internal dispute regarding whether Voyager 1 should be commanded to take one last photograph of Earth before completing its primary mission. The resulting photograph has since become known as the Pale Blue Dot photograph.

On February 12, 1992, Truly was fired as Administrator. Two weeks before, Vice President Dan Quayle had met with Truly, requesting the Administrator step down and accept an ambassadorship. Truly considered the offer but ultimately declined.

When he was fired, Truly said, "I'm floored. I can't explain it". Senator Al Gore, who would succeed Quayle as vice president a year later, said he was concerned about the move, stating that Truly was "a good man who did a good job under difficult circumstances" and that "I view this as a very troubling sign that ... Quayle's space council may have forced Admiral Truly to leave this job because of the council's insistence on running NASA from the vice president's office."

Observers suggested the firing was due to Truly's focus on large-scale projects like extending the life of the Space Shuttle rather than smaller, faster missions favored by the administration. It was suggested "that he was captive of his bureaucracy and incapable of making the changes, the reforms, the administration wanted." Others pointed to the battle over the International Space Station, which unexpectedly ran into serious problems in Congress, requiring the administration to intervene to save it.

== Post-NASA activities ==
After leaving NASA, Truly became Vice President and Director of the Georgia Tech Research Institute, part of the Georgia Institute of Technology, in Atlanta, Georgia. He served in this role from 1992 to 1997.

Then he served as director of the Department of Energy's National Renewable Energy Laboratory and as executive vice president of the MRIGlobal (formerly Midwest Research Institute) from 1997–2005.

In May 2007, Retired Vice Admiral Richard Truly testified before the U.S. Senate Committee on Foreign Relations as a member of a military advisory board on the subject of the threats to U.S. national security posed by global climate change.

In 2010, Truly was appointed to the board of trustees of the Colorado School of Mines by Governor Bill Ritter. He served as the vice chairman of the board.

== Personal life and death ==
Truly was married to Colleen "Cody" Hanner, and had three children. He died at his home in Genesee, Colorado, on February 27, 2024, at the age of 86.

== Decorations ==
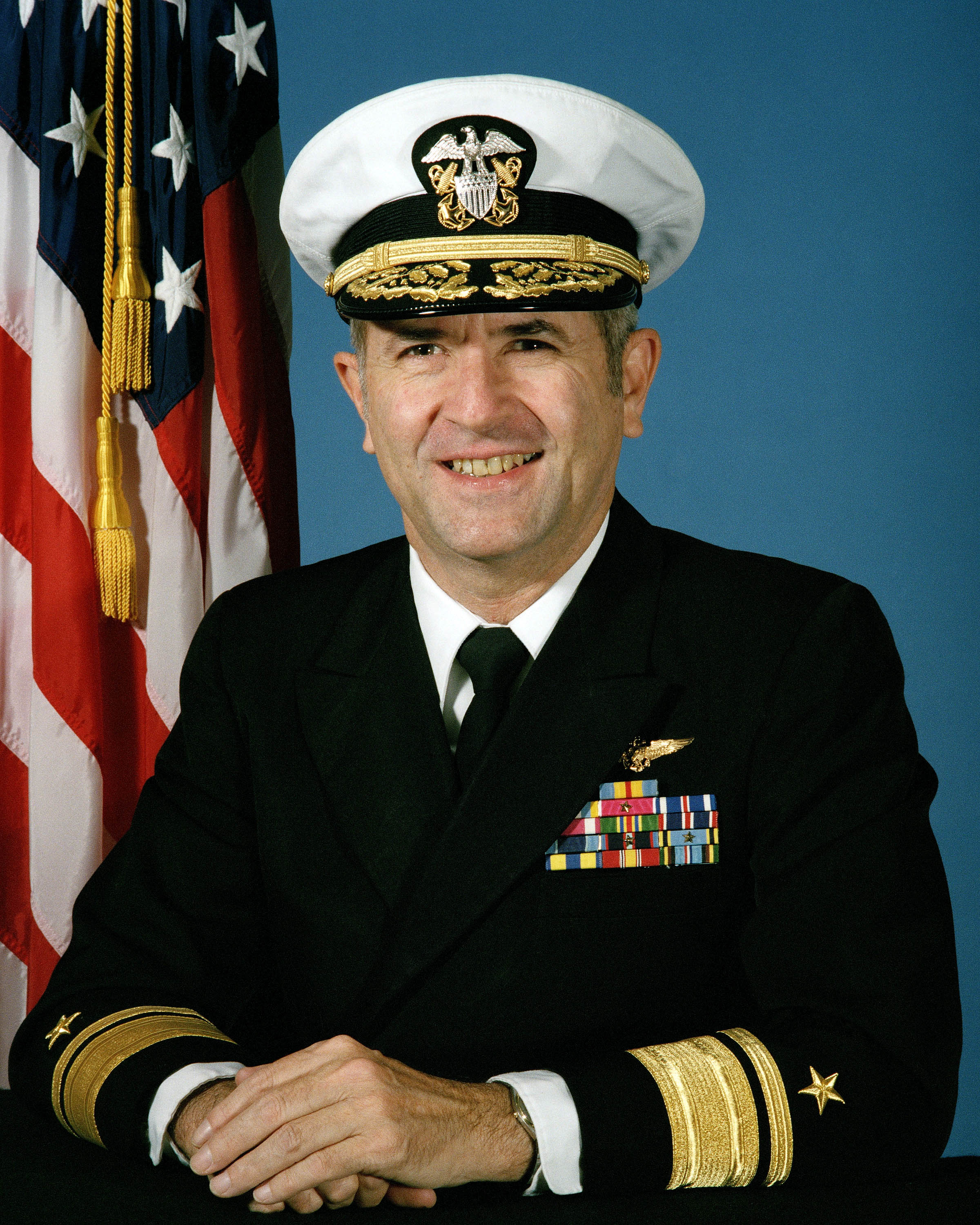
Official Navy portrait of Richard H. Truly

Truly was awarded the following military decorations and government awards:

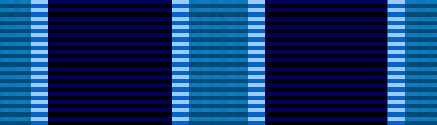

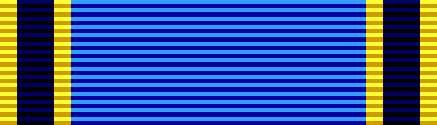

Defense Distinguished Service Medal
Defense Superior Service Medal	Legion of Merit with one star	Distinguished Flying Cross
Meritorious Service Medal	Presidential Citizens Medal	NASA Distinguished Service Medal with one star
NASA Outstanding Leadership Medal	NASA Exceptional Service Medal with one star	NASA Space Flight Medal with one star

In 1988, he was awarded the Society of Experimental Test Pilots James H. Doolittle Award. He also received that year the Collier Trophy for his role in assisting NASA's return to launching crewed missions after the Challenger disaster. He was awarded the Johnson Space Center Superior Achievement Award in 1972. He also received the American Astronautical Society's Flight Achievement Award in 1977. In 1995, he was inducted into the Georgia Aviation Hall of Fame. He was awarded the General Thomas D. White USAF Space Trophy for 1981.

== See also ==
- List of Eagle Scouts

Government offices
Preceded by James C. Fletcher	Administrator of the National Aeronautics and Space Administration; 1989–1992	Succeeded by Daniel Goldin
