= Stratospheric Aerosol and Gas Experiment =

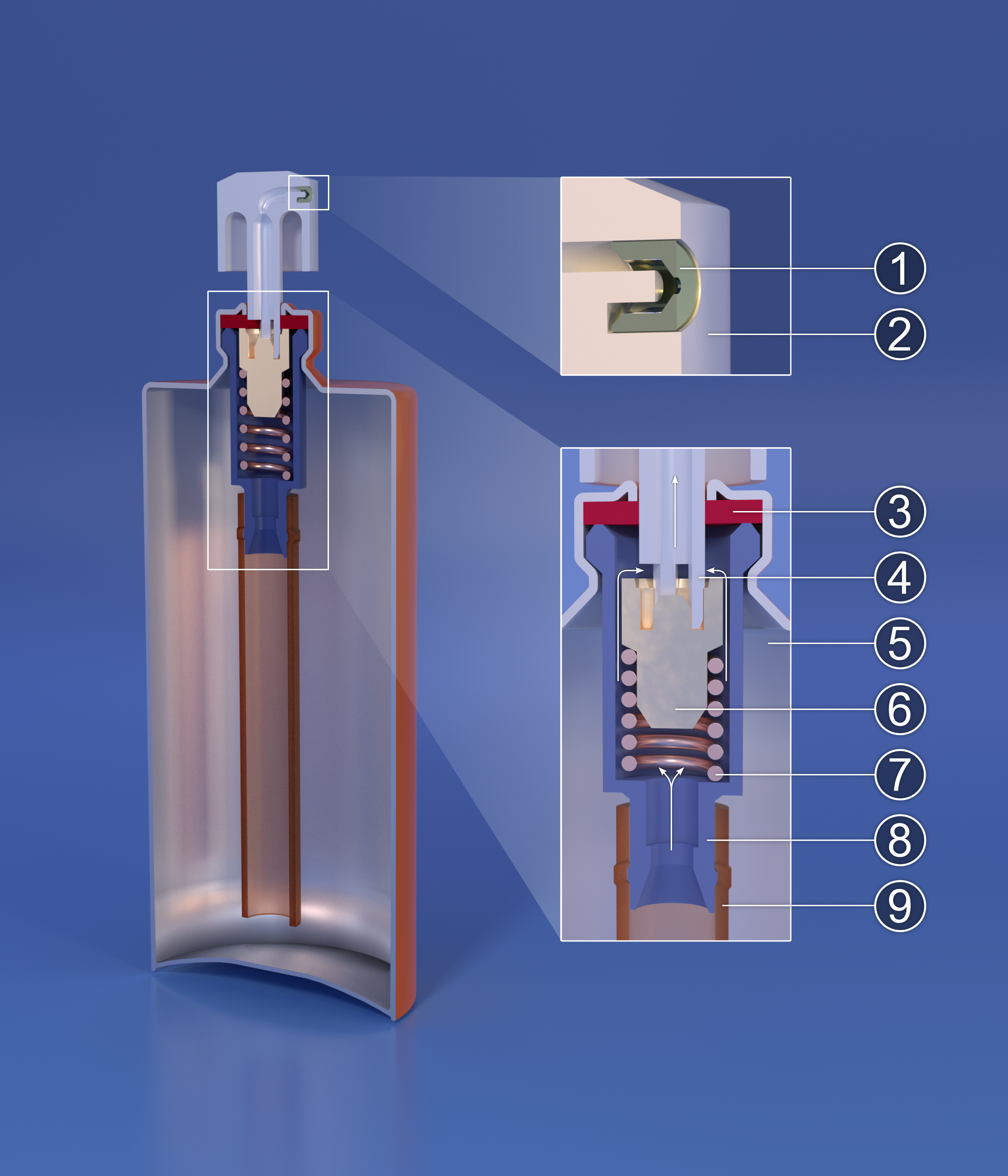
An Aerosol and Gas Valve

The Stratospheric Aerosol and Gas Experiment (SAGE) is a series of remote sensing satellite instruments used to study the chemical composition of Earth's atmosphere. Specifically, SAGE has been used to study the Earth's ozone layer and aerosols at the troposphere through the stratosphere. The SAGE instruments use solar occultation measurement technique to determine chemical concentrations in the atmosphere. Solar occultation measurement technique measures sunlight through the atmosphere and ratios that measurement with a sunlight measurement without atmospheric attenuation. This is achieved by observing sunrises and sunsets during a satellite orbit. Physically, the SAGE instruments measure ultraviolet/visible energy and this is converted via algorithms to determine chemical concentrations. SAGE data has been used to study the atmospheres aerosols, ozone, water vapor, and other trace gases.

== History ==
There has been 4 series of SAGE instruments:

- SAGE I - Flew on the Explorer 60 satellite.
- SAGE II - Flew on the Earth Radiation Budget Satellite (ERBS).
- SAGE III - Flew on the Meteor-3M No.1.
- SAGE III on ISS, was launched on the SpaceX CRS-10 mission using a Falcon 9 with Cargo Dragon. It was launched on 19 February 2017 and installed on the International Space Station (ISS).
