= Robert Crippen =

American astronaut (born 1937)

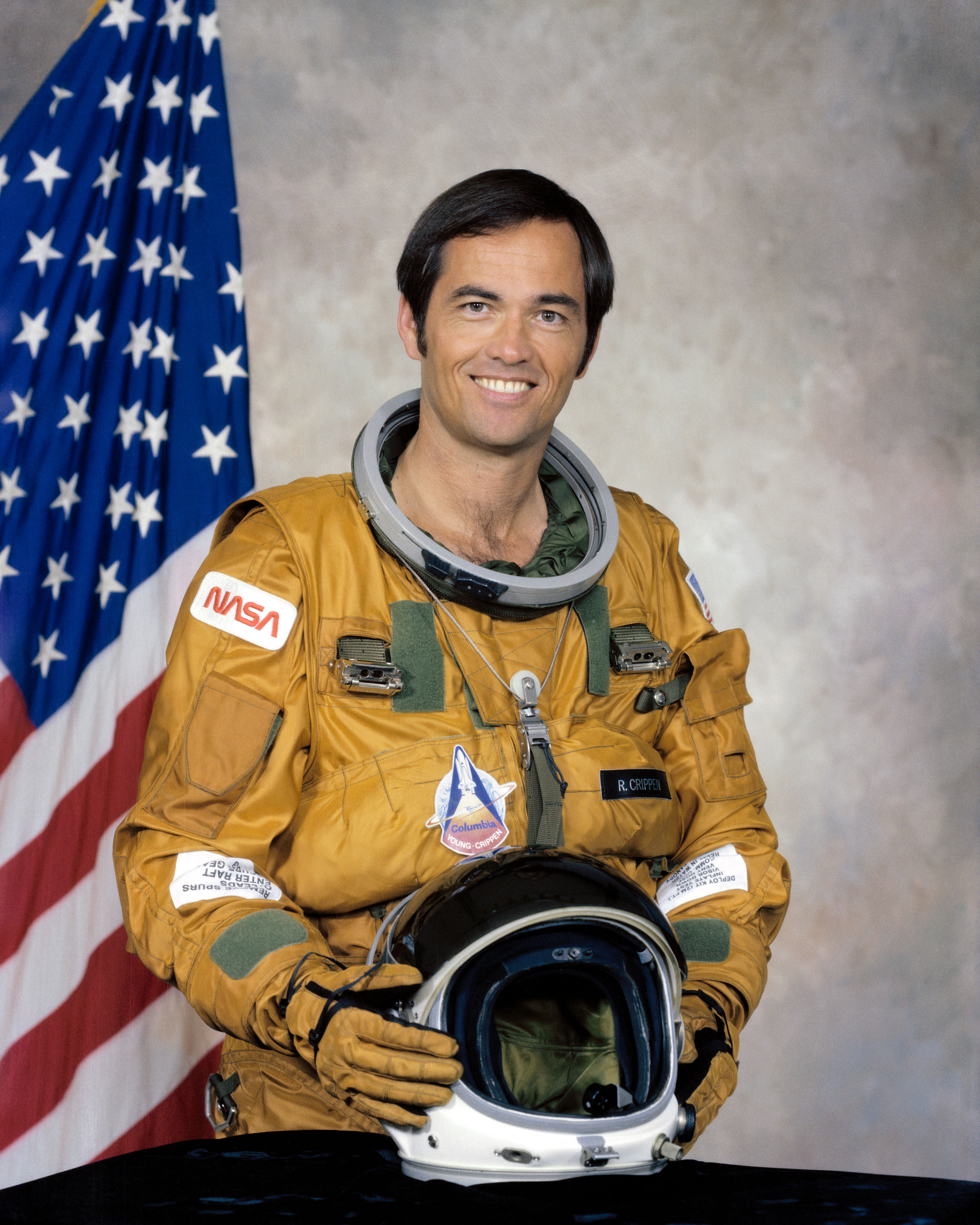
- Crippen in 1979
- Born: Robert Laurel Crippen; September 11, 1937 (age 89); Beaumont, Texas, U.S.
- Education: University of Texas, Austin (BS)
- Awards: Distinguished Flying Cross; Congressional Space Medal of Honor; NASA Distinguished Service Medal; James H. Doolittle Award
- Space career

NASA astronaut
- Rank: Captain, USN
- Time in space: 23d 13h 46m
- Selection: USAF MOL Group 2 (1966); NASA Group 7 (1969)
- Mission: STS-1; STS-7; STS-41-C; STS-41-G
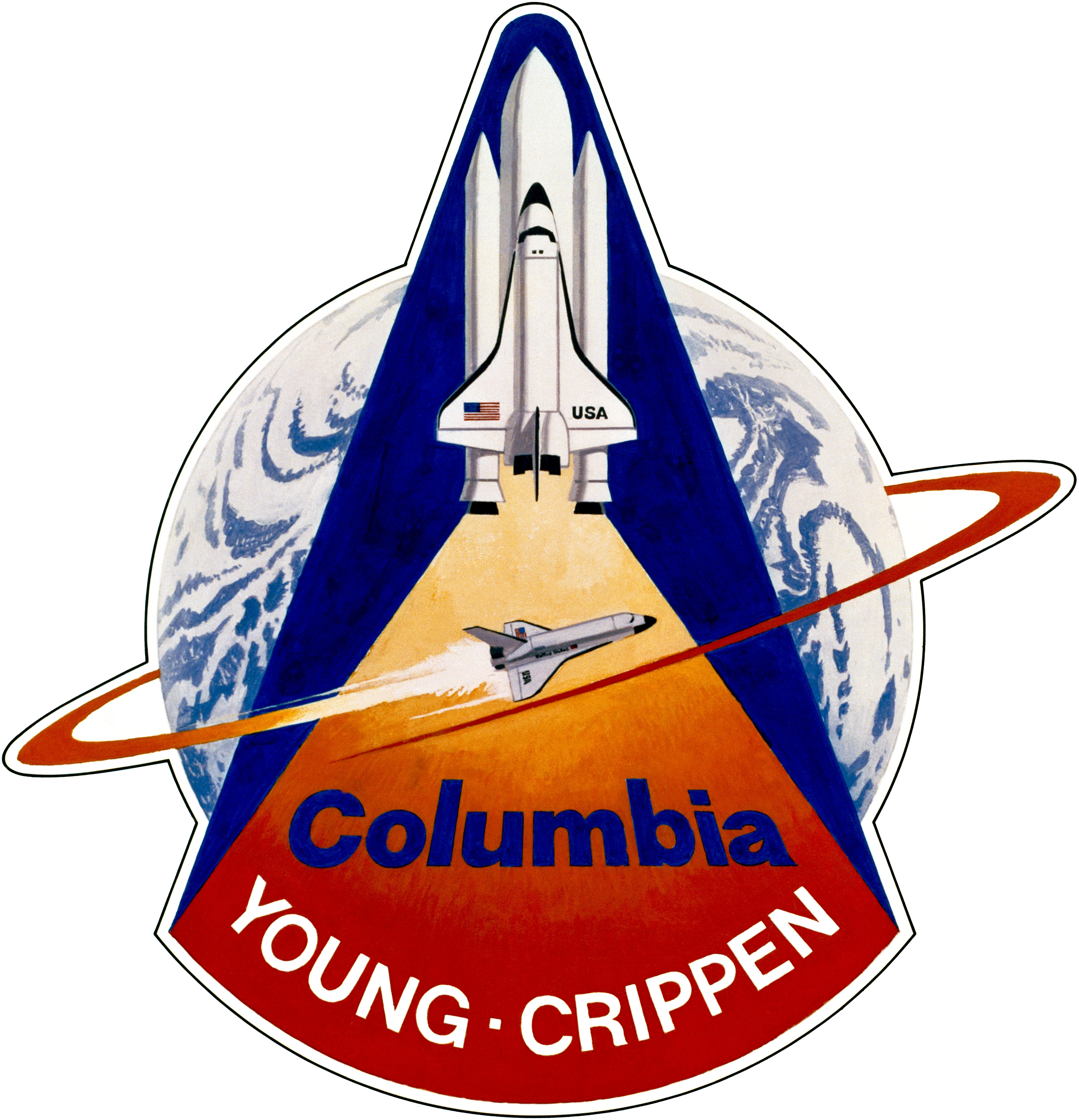
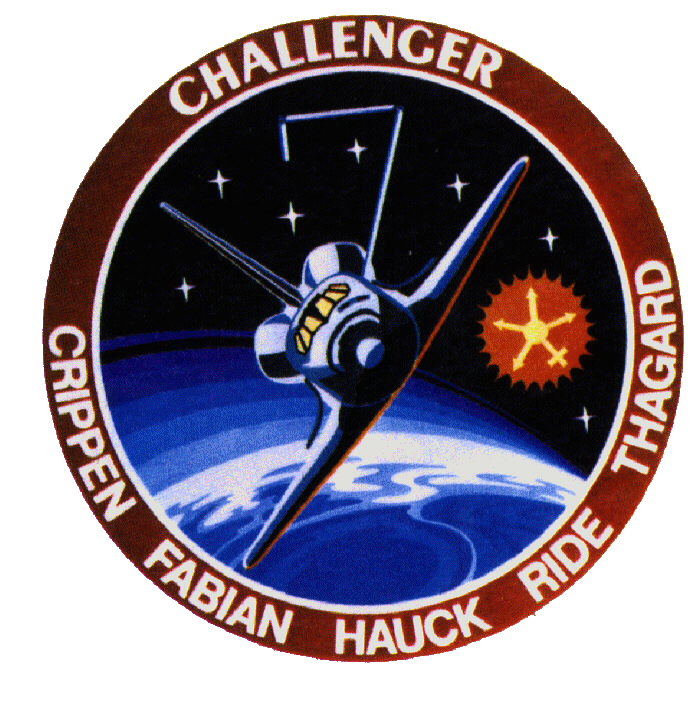
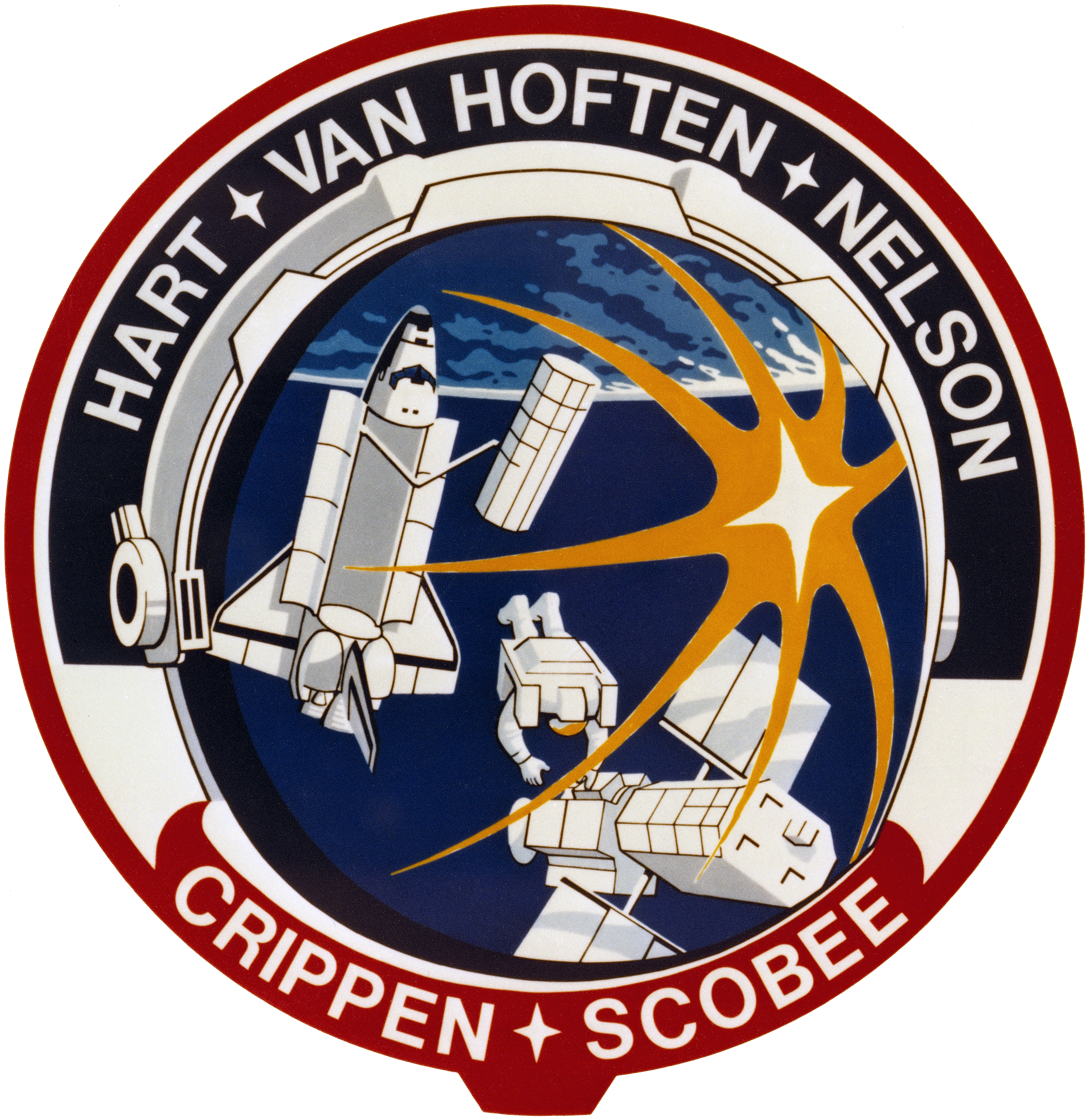
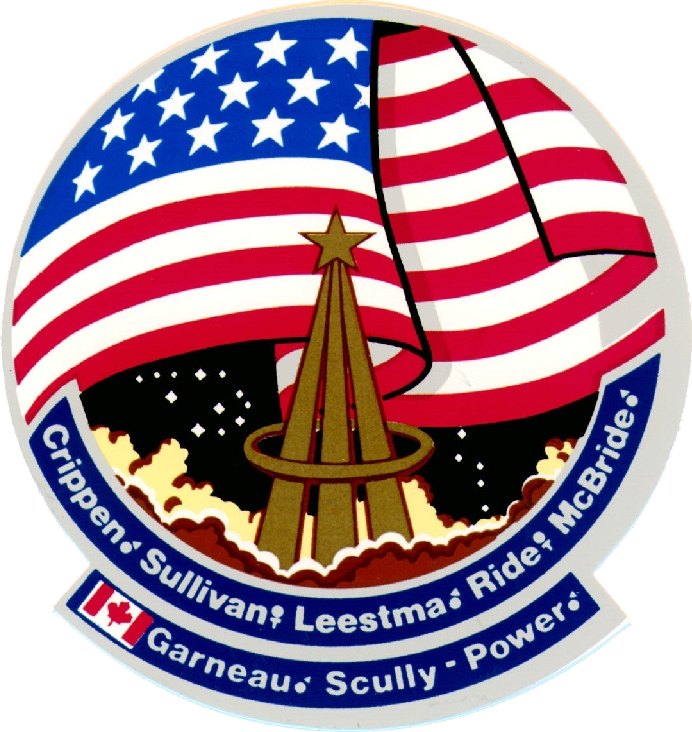
- Mission insignia
- Retired: December 31, 1991

Robert Laurel Crippen (born September 11, 1937) is an American retired naval officer and aviator, test pilot, aerospace engineer, and astronaut. He traveled into space four times: as pilot of STS-1 in April 1981, the first Space Shuttle mission; and as commander of STS-7 in June 1983, STS-41-C in April 1984, and STS-41-G in October 1984. He was also a part of the Manned Orbiting Laboratory (MOL), Skylab Medical Experiment Altitude Test (SMEAT), ASTP support crew member, and the Approach and Landing Tests (ALT) for the Space Shuttle.

In 1986, Crippen participated in the recovery operations for the remains of crew members after the Space Shuttle Challenger disaster. He was also on the commission responsible for determining the cause of the accident.

After retiring as an astronaut, Crippen worked his way through management at NASA, namely as Director, Space Shuttle, at NASA Headquarters, then Director of the Kennedy Space Center. He also went to Lockheed Martin and Thiokol Propulsion before retiring to private life in Florida.

Crippen has received several awards and honors, including the Congressional Space Medal of Honor in 2006, and having an elementary school named after him in Porter, Texas. He is also a fellow of several organizations, including the American Institute of Aeronautics and Astronautics (AIAA) and the Society of Experimental Test Pilots (SETP).

== Early life and education ==
Robert Crippen was born in Beaumont, Texas, on September 11, 1937. After graduating from New Caney High School in New Caney, Texas in 1955, Crippen went to the University of Texas at Austin to major in Aerospace Engineering. In 1960, he graduated with his Bachelor of Science degree. He was selected as a member of the Texas Alpha chapter of Tau Beta Pi and Sigma Gamma Tau.

Crippen became interested in flying and computers at a very early age. He attended the first computer programming class held at the University of Texas. Throughout his career in the military and at NASA, he worked on computer programming, including programs such as the Manned Orbiting Laboratory, Skylab and the Space Shuttle.

== Military career ==
Crippen was commissioned through the United States Navy's Aviation Officer Candidate School (AOCS) Program at Naval Air Station Pensacola, Florida. He also spent time at the Naval Air Station Whiting Field in Florida and the Naval Air Station Chase Field in Beeville, Texas. That is where he earned his wings. As a Naval Aviator from the summer of 1962 to the end of 1964, he made two deployments aboard the USS Independence, flying the A-4 Skyhawk in Attack Squadron 72 (VA-72). He later went to Edwards Air Force Base in California to attend the U.S. Air Force Aerospace Research Pilot School. After graduation, Crippen worked as an instructor at Edwards Air Force Base until October 1966 when he was picked for the U.S. Air Force's Manned Orbiting Laboratory (MOL) program. He has spent more than 6,500 hours in the air as either a pilot or an astronaut.

=== Manned Orbiting Laboratory ===
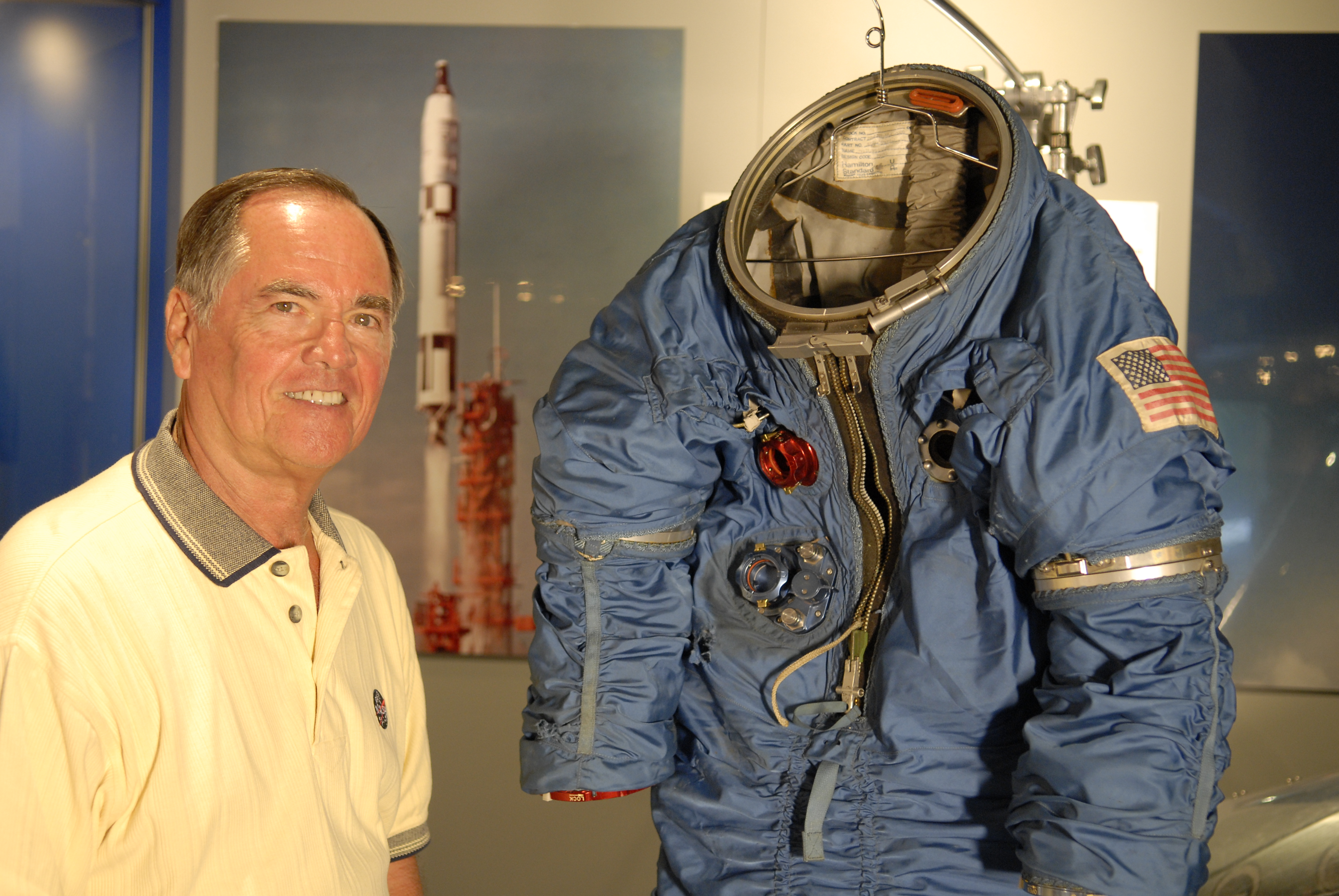
Crippen with a MOL spacesuit

The Manned Orbiting Laboratory (MOL) program was a follow-on to the X-20 Dyna-Soar program. A joint program between the United States Air Force and the National Reconnaissance Office (NRO), the MOL program would send humans into space.

Publicly, the MOL program was designed to determine the usefulness of man in space. Crews would be in orbit for about a month and they would be able to freely move about the laboratory. The secret and primary mission was to perform reconnaissance missions on Soviet Union and China. The pilots were not told of this true mission, though they were later informed.

When Crippen was selected for astronaut training in October 1966, he had to choose between the military and NASA, deciding to stay in the military to work on the MOL program. He felt that he would get lost at NASA due to the number of astronauts already in programs at the agency. There was an uncrewed flight on November 3, 1966. There were no crewed flights.

The MOL program was canceled in June 1969, after which Crippen transferred to NASA to continue his career. The cancellation was due to differing priorities within the military and space programs, with the government deciding to de-emphasize military involvement in the space program. However, developments like the space suit, waste management, and the high resolution camera were later used in various space programs going forward.

== NASA career ==
We were flying on a winged vehicle that would do reentry different than we had ever done before. So all of those were firsts. Test pilots truly love firsts.

— Crippen's Shuttle experiences

After the MOL program was canceled, Crippen became part of NASA Astronaut Group 7 in September 1969. He served as support for the Skylab 2, Skylab 3, and Skylab 4, as well as for the Apollo-Soyuz Test Project.

=== Skylab Medical Experiment Altitude Test (SMEAT) ===
The Skylab Medical Experiment Altitude Test (SMEAT) was a 56-day mission (July 26 through September 19, 1972), where astronauts Crippen, Karol J. Bobko and William E. Thornton were housed in a vacuum chamber to conduct medical experiments. The goal was to ensure that crews in space could handle minor medical emergencies, including dentistry. SMEAT also was able to discover and fix the design flaws in the urine handling system for Skylab. Crippen and the team worked to enlarge the original collection system design, which was too small, the collection system of which had burst at one point.

=== Apollo-Soyuz Test Project ===
The Apollo-Soyuz Test Project (ASTP) was a joint effort between the United States and the Soviet Union, designed to test rendezvous and docking capabilities if there were ever an emergency in space. Crippen was the capsule communicator (CAPCOM) for the Apollo-Soyuz Test Project (as well as Skylab), during which time he developed a close association with Mission Operations and Flight Control. On July 15, 1975, the United States launched a Saturn IB launch vehicle in an Apollo configuration into space. Two days later, it docked with a Soyuz spacecraft.

=== Approach and Landing Tests (ALT) ===
The Approach and Landing tests for the Space Shuttle were critical to the overall program, in which a crew tested the maneuverability and landing capabilities of the spacecraft. Launched from a 747 aircraft, the prototype Space Shuttle Enterprise was first tested on August 12, 1977. Astronauts Fred W. Haise Jr. and C. Gordon Fullerton piloted the Enterprise from about 7,300 m (24,000 ft) to the ground and landed at Edwards Air Force Base. A second crew of astronauts Joe H. Engle and Richard H. Truly alternated with Haise and Fullerton to test the Enterprise's capabilities. Crippen was first assigned to family support with the testing, then progressed to being a chase pilot in a T-38. The ALT program lasted about a year, testing all aspects of approach and touchdown from aerodynamics to maneuverability, gliding and landing characteristics.

=== STS-1 ===
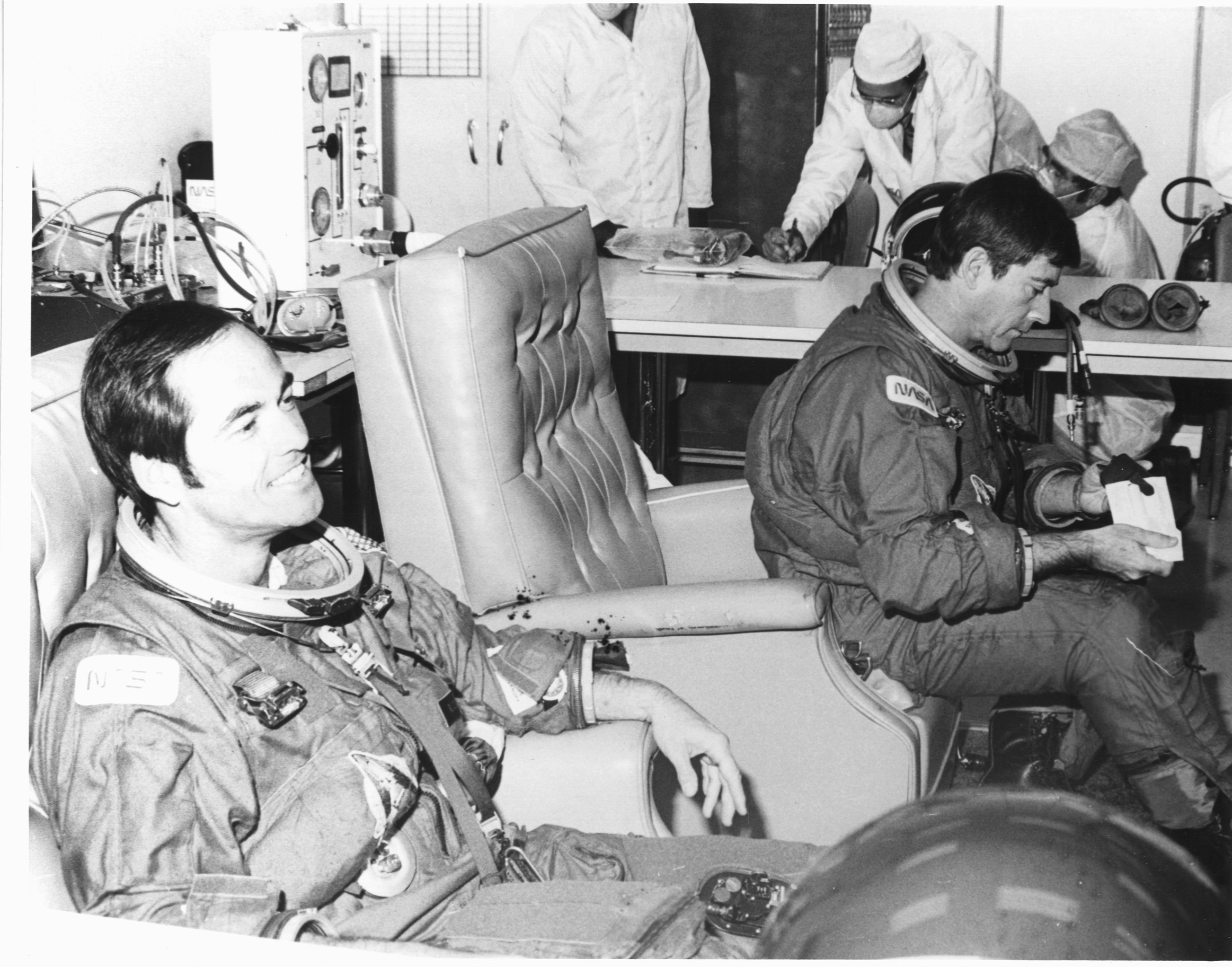
John Young and Crippen suiting up for the STS-1 mission.

Crippen was the pilot of the Space Shuttle Columbia on STS-1, the first test flight of the Space Shuttle in orbit. His job involved working with the Shuttle computers, electrical systems, and auxiliary power units. He was also responsible for operating the payload bay doors. STS-1 had several firsts: a crewed vehicle to be flown into Earth orbit without any prior non-crewed orbital testing; a crewed, winged vehicle to launch with solid rocket boosters; a reentry vehicle to land on a conventional runway. It launched April 12, 1981, and landed April 14, 1981.

=== STS-7 ===
Crippen served as the commander of STS-7, the second launch of the Space Shuttle Challenger, and headed a crew of five people. During flight, the team deployed the Canadian Anik-C2 satellite, as well as the Palapa-B1 satellite from Indonesia. They also used the Canadian Remote Manipulator System (Canadarm) to deploy and retrieve the Shuttle Pallet Satellite (SPAS-01). They conducted formation flying with an untethered satellite (SPAS-02), operated a joint U.S.-German materials experiment (OSTA-2) and activated seven Getaway Special (GAS) experiments. Finally, they worked with the Continuous Flow Electrophoresis System (CFES) and the Monodisperse Latex Reactor (MLR). It launched June 18, 1983, and landed on June 24, 1983.

=== STS-41-C ===
Crippen was the commander of Space Shuttle Challenger on STS-41-C, a seven-day mission during which the crew deployed the Long Duration Exposure Facility (LDEF). The crew also retrieved, repaired and redeployed Solar Maximum Mission (SMM) satellite using the Canadarm. The flight also tested the Manned Maneuvering Units (MMU) through two extravehicular activities (EVAs). The team also operated the Cinema 360 and IMAX Camera Systems. Finally, the crew ran a student experiment on honey bees. It launched April 6, 1984, and landed April 13, 1984.

=== STS-41-G ===
On his final spaceflight, Crippen served as the commander of STS-41-G. During the eight-day flight, the Space Shuttle Challenger crew deployed the Earth Radiation Budget Satellite (ERBS). They also performed scientific observations of the Earth with a Large Format Camera, and demonstrated potential satellite refueling with the Orbital Refueling System (ORS). Finally, the Office of Space and Terrestrial Applications-3 (OSTA-3) also had experiments for the crew to perform. It launched October 5, 1984, and landed October 13, 1984, at Kennedy Space Center, Florida.

=== Post-spaceflight career ===
After STS-41-G, Crippen became deputy director of flight crew operations (1984–1986) and was also named commander of the STS-62-A mission which would have launched from the new SLC-6 facility at Vandenberg Air Force Base, California. That mission was canceled after the Space Shuttle Challenger disaster in 1986, and SLC-6 was mothballed in 1989.

Crippen was personally involved in the recovery efforts of the Challenger disaster, brooking no interference in recovering all seven bodies of the Challenger crew for their families. Crippen was also a part of the STS-51-L Interim Mishap Review Board to examine the cause of the Challenger accident. The Board became a sub-team for the Rogers Commission Report, the team put together by President Ronald Reagan to investigate the accident.

Crippen was stationed at Kennedy Space Center (KSC) from July 1987 to December 1989 where he was Deputy Director of Shuttle Operations under Arnie Aldrich, Director of Space Shuttle. He was accountable for Shuttle missions and the return of the craft to KSC after landings at Edwards.

From January 1990 to January 1992, Crippen served as Director of the Space Shuttle program at NASA Headquarters. As such, he was responsible for the all aspects of the Shuttle program, including scheduling, budget and overall program management. Afterwards, he moved to KSC to become center director. This lasted from January 1992 through January 1995.

== Post-NASA career ==
After leaving NASA, from April 1995 through November 1996, Crippen was the Vice President of Lockheed Martin Information Systems. His main focus was simulation work supporting the military.

Crippen became President of Thiokol Propulsion from December 1996 through April 2001. They were responsible for producing the Space Shuttle Reusable Solid Rocket Motors. Crippen enjoyed continuing his connection with the Space Shuttle program. In particular, he appreciated his role in working to improve the design of the solid rocket boosters to prevent another Challenger disaster.

== Organizations ==
Crippen is a fellow in the American Institute of Aeronautics and Astronautics (AIAA), the Society of Experimental Test Pilots (SETP), and the American Astronautical Society (AAS). He served as President of the American Institute of Aeronautics and Astronautics in 1999. He was selected to be a member of Naval Aviators Golden Eagles in 2009. He was elected to the National Academy of Engineering in 2012 for leadership in human space flight and development of solid fueled rockets.

== Awards and honors ==
Sign of Crippen Elementary School in Porter, Texas, named after Robert Crippen

Crippen has earned several awards throughout his career, including the SETP Iven C. Kincheloe Award (1981) and the NASA Exceptional Service Medal (1972). In 1981, after the inaugural Space Shuttle flight, he received the Department of Defense Distinguished Service Award, the American Astronautical Society's Flight Achievement Award, the National Geographic Society's Gardiner Greene Hubbard Medal, and the American Legion's Distinguished Service Medal. He was awarded the Federal Aviation Administration (FAA)'s Award for Distinguished Service (1982), the Dr. Robert H. Goddard Memorial Trophy and the Harmon Trophy. He received the Navy Distinguished Flying Cross (1984) and the Defense Meritorious Service Medal (1984). Finally, Crippen received the Golden Plate Award of the American Academy of Achievement (1986).

He also received NASA Outstanding Leadership Medal, four NASA Space Flight Medals, and three NASA Distinguished Service Medals. In 1996, Crippen became the tenth individual to receive the Rotary National Award for Space Achievement's National Space Trophy. He was inducted into the International Space Hall of Fame in 1991 and the U.S. Astronaut Hall of Fame in 2001. On April 6, 2006, he received the Congressional Space Medal of Honor, the highest award for spaceflight achievement.

On November 18, 2015, at the National Business Aviation Association convention in Las Vegas, Crippen was announced as a 2016 Inductee into the National Aviation Hall of Fame.

On December 15, 2023, Crippen received the Wright Brothers Memorial Trophy from the National Aeronautic Association in Washington, D.C. for his devotion to public service and the advancement of American aerospace; his achievements as an aviator, astronaut, and leader; and his selfless dedication to the future of humankind.

== Personal life ==
Crippen was first married to Virginia Hill on September 8, 1959. They had three daughters together: Ellen Marie (born June 1962), Susan Lynn (born December 1964), and Linda Ruth (born May 1967). On November 7, 1987, he married Pandora Puckett, NASA's first female lead Orbiter Project Engineer, on the Space Shuttle Atlantis and Challenger at the Kennedy Space Center.

== See also ==
- List of spaceflight records
