= SAGE III on ISS =

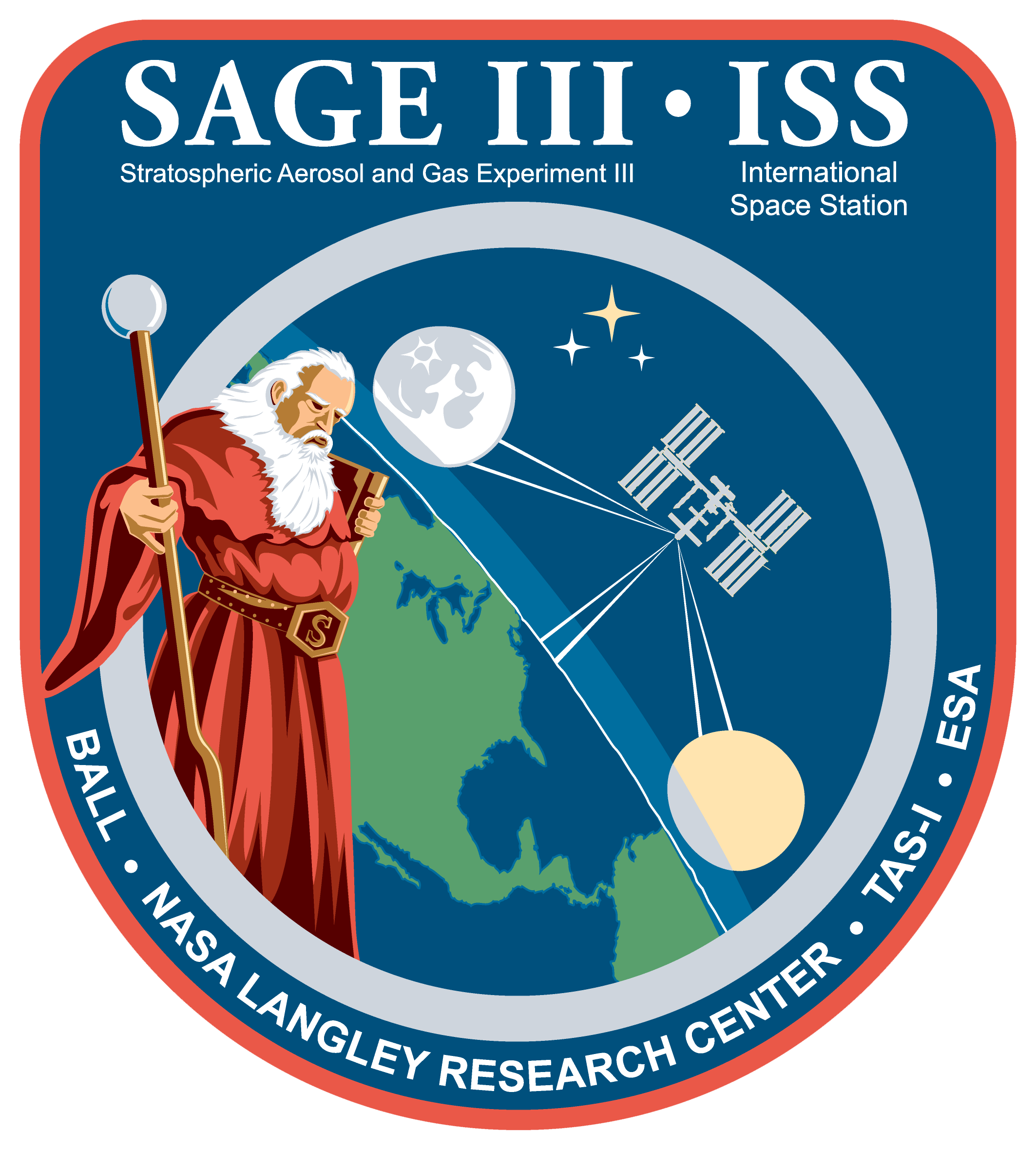
SAGE III on ISS mission logo

SAGE III on ISS is the fourth generation of a series of NASA Earth-observing instruments, known as the Stratospheric Aerosol and Gas Experiment. The first SAGE III instrument was launched on a Russian Meteor-3M satellite. The recently revised SAGE III was mounted to the International Space Station where it uses the unique vantage point of ISS to make long-term measurements of ozone, aerosols, water vapor, and other gases in Earth's atmosphere.

== History of the SAGE legacy ==
The first SAGE instrument was launched on 18 February 1979, to collect data on the various gases in the atmosphere, including ozone. The data collected on SAGE I and the following instrument SAGE II, which began taking measurements in October 1984, were critical to the discovery of the Earth's ozone hole and the creation of 1987 Montreal Protocol, which banned ozone-depleting substances, such as chlorofluorocarbon (CFC).

SAGE III on ISS is a nearly exact replica of SAGE III, on Meteor-3M, sent into orbit in 2001 on a Russian satellite. SAGE III on Meteor-3M went out of service in March 2006 when the satellite's power supply stopped working. The new instrument was built in anticipation of being attached to the space station in 2005. A change in ISS design, however, put those plans on hold. The instrument was stored in a Class 100 clean room in a sealed shipping container under a continuous gaseous nitrogen purge. The purge kept clean dry "air" inside the instrument.

Recently, the opportunity arose for SAGE III to be placed on ISS, and build on the long record of stratospheric gas data that its ancestors created. The week of 14 February 2011, scientists at NASA Langley Research Center pulled the instrument from storage to begin initial testing and calibrations in preparation prepping it for launch.

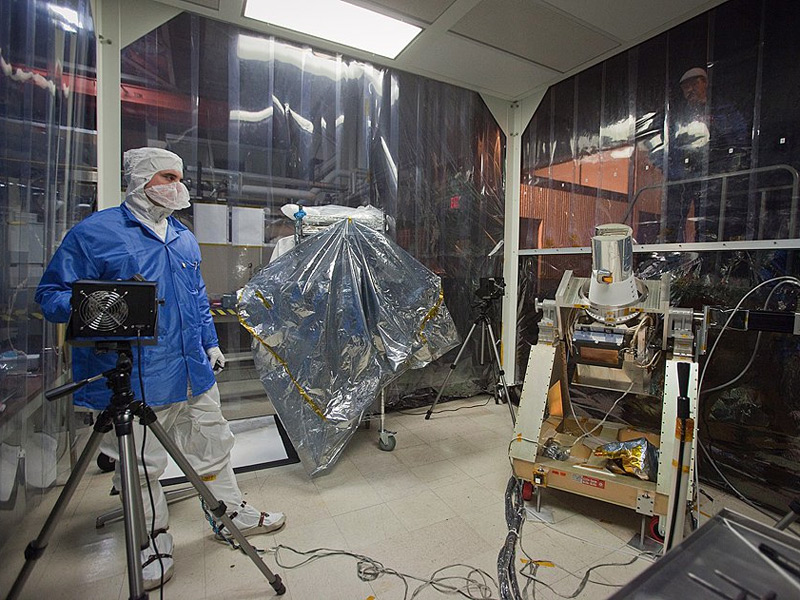
SAGE III on ISS preparing for its scan of the Moon on 17 February 2011. The SAGE team arrived at midnight to continue testing the instrument, which will be attached to the space station to measure ozone, water vapor and aerosols in the Earth's atmosphere.

== Science behind SAGE III on ISS ==
The 76 kg (168 lb) SAGE III instrument is a grating spectrometer that measures ultraviolet and visible energy. It relies upon the flight-proven designs used in the Stratospheric Aerosol Measurement (SAM I) and first and second SAGE instruments. The SAGE III design incorporates charge-coupled device (CCD) array detectors and a 16 bit A/D converter. Combined, these devices allow for wavelength calibration, a self-consistent determination of the viewing geometry, lunar occultation measurements, and expanded wavelength coverage.

The SAGE III sensor assembly consists of pointing and imaging subsystems and a UV/visible spectrometer. The pointing and imaging systems are employed to acquire light from either the Sun or Moon by vertically scanning across the object. The spectrometer uses an 800 element CCD linear array to provide continuous spectral coverage between 290 and 1030 nm. Additional aerosol information is provided by a discrete photodiode at 1550 nm. This configuration enables SAGE III to make multiple measurements of absorption features of target gaseous species and multi-wavelength measurements of broadband extinction by aerosols.

== Atmospheric components studied by SAGE III on ISS ==
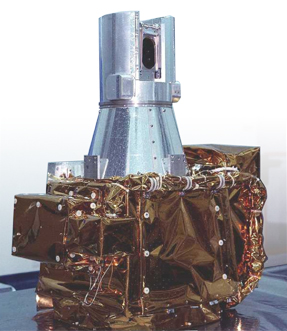
SAGE III instrument

The SAGE III mission is an important part of NASA's Earth Observation System and is designed to fulfill the primary scientific objective of obtaining high quality, global measurements of key components of atmospheric composition and their long-term variability. The primary focus of SAGE III on ISS will be to study aerosols, clouds, water vapor, pressure and temperature, nitrogen dioxide, nitrogen trioxide, and chlorine dioxide.

=== Aerosols ===
Aerosols play an essential role in the radiative and chemical processes that govern the Earth's climate. Since stratospheric aerosol loading has varied by a factor of 30 since 1979, long-term monitoring of tropospheric and stratospheric aerosols is crucial. SAGE III aerosol measurements will provide important contributions in the area of aerosol research.

=== Clouds ===
Clouds play a major role in determining the planet's solar and longwave energy balance and, thus, are important in governing the Earth's climate. SAGE III will provide measurements of mid and high level clouds including thin or "sub-visual" clouds that are not detectable by nadir-viewing passive remote sensors. These observations are important because while low clouds primarily reflect incoming solar radiation back into space (acting to cool the planet), mid and high level clouds enhance the "greenhouse effect" by trapping infrared radiation (acting to warm the planet). Also, the presence of thin cloud near the tropopause may play a significant role in heterogeneous chemical processes that lead to ozone destruction in mid-latitudes.

=== Water vapor ===
Water vapor is the most abundant greenhouse gas in Earth's atmosphere and plays an important role in regulating the climate system . Improved understanding of the global water vapor distribution can help researchers better characterize water's role in climate processes and their response to water vapor feedback . SAGE III measurements aim to provide observations that can contribute to studies of the distribution, variability and long-term changes of stratospheric water vapor and its role in the global climate.

=== Ozone ===
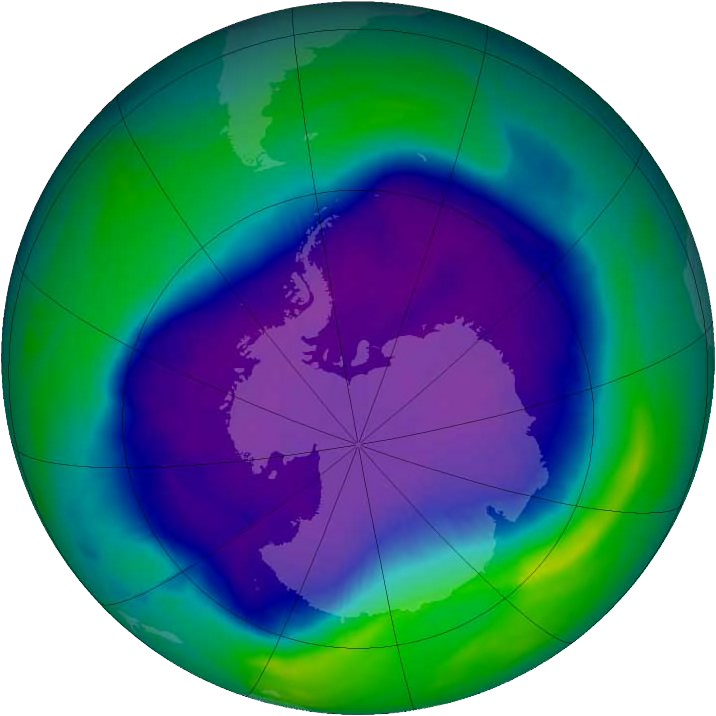
From 21 to 30 September 2006, the average area of the ozone hole was the largest ever observed, at 10.6 million square miles (27.5 million square kilometres). This image, from 24 September 2006, the Antarctic ozone hole was equal to the record single-day largest area of 11.4 million square miles (29.5 million square kilometres), reached on 9 September 2000. The blue and purple colors are where there is the least ozone, and the greens, yellows, and reds are where there is more ozone.

Ozone research has remained at the forefront of atmospheric science for many years because stratospheric ozone shields the Earth's surface (and its inhabitants) from harmful ultraviolet radiation. Since recent declines in stratospheric ozone have been linked to human activity, accurate long-term measurements of ozone remain crucial.

It is important to monitor ozone levels in the lower stratosphere and upper troposphere since observed trends are the largest and most poorly understood at those altitudes. SAGE III's high vertical resolution and long-term stability make it uniquely well suited to make these measurements. SAGE III is also able to look at the relationship between aerosol, cloud, and chemical processes affecting ozone argue for simultaneous measurements of these atmospheric constituents (such as those made by SAGE III).

=== Pressure and temperature ===
SAGE III temperature measurements will provide a unique data set for monitoring and understanding atmospheric temperature changes. In particular, the long-term stability and self-calibration capabilities of SAGE III may permit the detection of trends in stratospheric and mesospheric temperature that will be important diagnostics of climate change. SAGE III temperature measurements in the upper stratosphere and mesosphere will be a new source of long-term temperature measurements in this region of the atmosphere to complement existing long-term measurements made by satellites (MLS, ACE, SABER) and ground based lidar systems. SAGE III temperature measurements will also allow the monitoring of periodic temperature changes, such as those associated with the solar cycle and quasi-biennial oscillation, and the effects of radiative forcing by aerosols.

=== Nitrogen dioxide, nitrogen trioxide, and chlorine dioxide ===
Nitrogen dioxide (NO_{2}), nitrogen trioxide (NO_{3}), and chlorine dioxide (OClO) play crucial roles in stratospheric chemistry and the catalytic cycles that destroy stratospheric ozone. SAGE III nitrogen dioxide measurements are important because the processes that occur in the Antarctic winter and spring and give rise to the ozone hole effectively convert NO_{2} to nitric acid (HNO_{3}). Thus NO_{2} is an important diagnostic of ozone hole chemistry. Since it is measured during both solar and lunar occultation events, SAGE III observations of NO_{2} will improve our understanding of the strong diurnal (daily) cycles in stratospheric processes. In addition, SAGE III will make virtually unique measurements of nitrogen trioxide (NO_{3}). Although it is short-lived in the presence of sunlight, NO_{3} plays an active role in the chemistry of other reactive nitrogen species such as NO_{2} and di-nitrogen pentoxide (N_{2}O_{5}) and, thus, indirectly in ozone chemistry. Since few other measurements of NO_{3} are available, SAGE III measurements, which are made during lunar occultation (nighttime) events, will provide crucial validation for our current understanding of reactive nitrogen chemistry.

== Launch ==
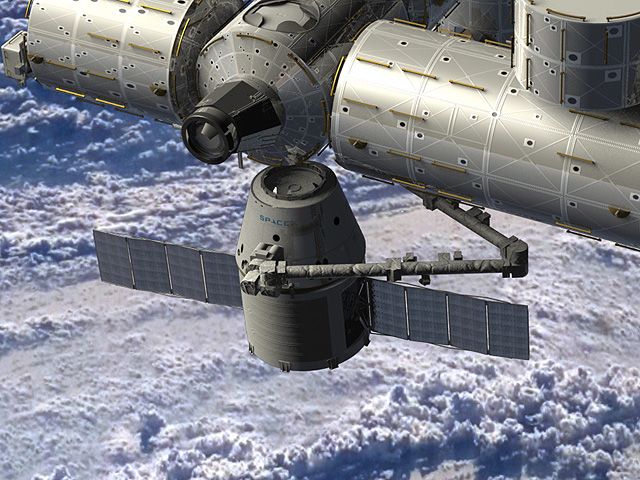
Artist rendering of SpaceX Cargo Dragon spacecraft delivering cargo to the International Space Station

SAGE III was launched on the SpaceX CRS-10 mission using a Falcon 9 with Dragon. SAGE III traveled in the unpressurized trunk of Dragon, which launched on 19 February 2017. Upon arrival, NASA used Dextre to berth the instrument onto an ExPRESS Logistics Carrier platform on the ISS.

== International partners ==
NASA Langley Research Center, based out of Hampton, Virginia, is leading the SAGE III mission. Ball Aerospace & Technologies Corp. built the SAGE III-ISS instrument in Boulder, Colorado, and the European Space Agency (ESA) and Thales Alenia Space-Italy (TAS-I), headquartered in France, are providing a hexapod to keep the instrument pointing in the right direction as the ISS maneuvers in space.
