= Earth Radiation Budget Satellite =

NASA earth observation satellite

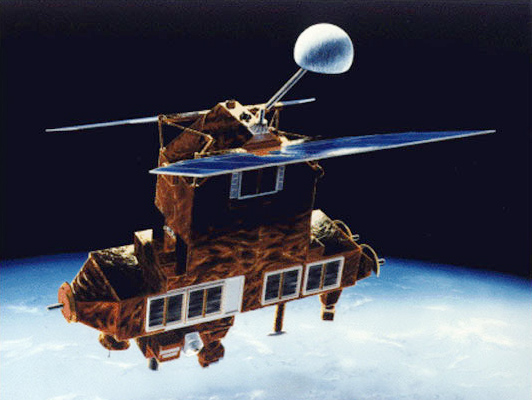
- The ERBS spacecraft
- Mission type: Earth observation
- Operator: NASA
- COSPAR ID: 1984-108B
- SATCAT no.: 15354
- Website: https://science.nasa.gov/missions/erbs
- Mission duration: Final: 21 years, 9 days

Spacecraft properties
- Manufacturer: Ball Aerospace
- Launch mass: 2,449 kg (5,399 lb)
- Dry mass: 2,307 kg (5,086 lb)
- Dimensions: 4.6 × 3.5 × 1.5 m (15.1 × 11.5 × 4.9 ft)
- Power: 470 watts

Start of mission
- Launch date: 5 October 1984, 22:18 UTC
- Rocket: Space Shuttle Challenger (STS-41-G)
- Launch site: Kennedy LC-39A

End of mission
- Disposal: Uncontrolled Re-Entry
- Deactivated: 14 October 2005
- Decay date: January 8, 2023; 3 years ago

Orbital parameters
- Reference system: Geocentric
- Regime: Low Earth
- Eccentricity: 0.00194
- Perigee altitude: 572 km (355 mi)
- Apogee altitude: 599 km (372 mi)
- Inclination: 56.9 deg
- Period: 96.4 min
- Epoch: 5 October 1984
Instruments
- ERBE: Earth Radiation Budget Experiment
- SAGE II: Stratospheric Aerosol and Gas Experiment II

The Earth Radiation Budget Satellite (ERBS) was a NASA scientific research satellite. The satellite was one of three satellites in NASA's research program, named Earth Radiation Budget Experiment (ERBE), to investigate the Earth's radiation budget. The satellite also carried an instrument that studied stratospheric aerosol and gases.

ERBS was launched on October 5, 1984, by the Space Shuttle Challenger during the STS-41-G mission and deactivated on October 14, 2005. It re-entered the Earth's atmosphere on January 8, 2023, over the Bering Sea near the Aleutian Islands. NASA's CERES instruments have continued the ERB data record after 1997.

== Mission ==
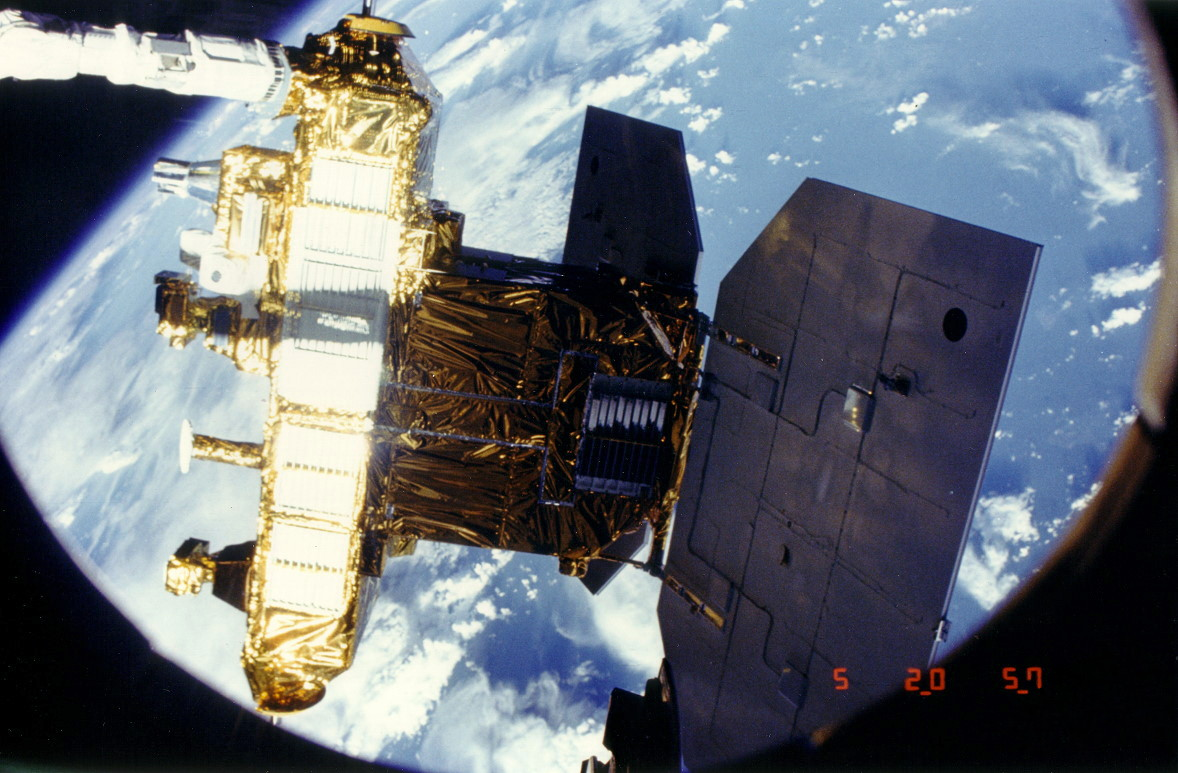
ERBS during deployment on STS-41-G

The ERBS spacecraft was deployed from Space Shuttle Challenger on October 5, 1984 (first day of flight) using the Canadian-built RMS (Remote Manipulator System), a mechanical arm of about 16 m in length. On deployment, one of the solar panels of ERBS failed initially to extend properly. Hence, mission specialist Sally Ride had to shake the satellite with the remotely-controlled robotic arm and then finally place the stuck panel into sunlight for the panel to extend.

The ERBS satellite was the first spacecraft to be launched and deployed by a Space Shuttle mission.

It orbited in a non-Sun synchronous orbit at 610 km (that dropped to 585 km by 1999). It was at an inclination of 57deg which did not provide full Earth coverage.

It had a design life of two years, with a goal of three, but lasted 21 years suffering several minor hardware failures along the way. The command memory was subject to random bit flips since launch. The ERBE scanner failed in 1990. There was a partial memory failure in October 1993. One of two Digital Telemetry Units failed in April 1998. In September 1999, a failure in the elevation gimbal of the non-scanner instrument suspended solar measurements for the solar monitor. Measurements resumed on December 22, 1999, when a new command sequence was defined. Only one of the five gyros was still functioning at the end of the mission, and thruster performance was unstable. During decommissioning, it was discovered that the fuel tank bladder had failed.

Battery failures led to the ultimate decision to decommission the spacecraft. Despite estimates that the satellite could continue to work until 2010, there was concern that if the satellite lost power before the batteries were disconnected from the solar arrays, the batteries could explode, creating a cloud of space debris that would endanger other satellites. In September 1989, the performance of the two batteries began to diverge. There were battery cell shorts on Battery 1 in August 1992 and again that September, and as a result Battery 1 was taken offline in October. Battery 2 was then supporting all loads and suffered a cell short in June 1993 and then July 1993. There was an attempt to bring battery 1 back online in August 1993, but it failed due to poor load sharing. Another cell failure began in June 1998 which culminated in a complete cell failure on January 15, 1999. That cell failure caused battery voltage to drop so low that Attitude Control system became unreliable and the satellite went into a very slow tumble. These cell failures and shorts all resulted in a loss of science data for a few days or months. The satellite was recovered and battery 1 was brought back online. Following that, battery 2 was disabled. By the end of the mission, battery 2 had experienced 5 cell failures and been disconnected from the main bus; and battery 1 had experienced 3 cell failures.

In 2002, the satellite's perigee was lowered more than 50 km to ensure that the vehicle would naturally decay within 25 years after its end of mission. This proved to be wise, because when the spacecraft was finally decommissioned in 2005 the propulsion and attitude control systems had become so degraded that the risks associated with eliminating the remaining fuel by performing post-science mission delta-V maneuvers were deemed too significant, and therefore those maneuvers were not performed.

=== Decommissioning and re-entry ===
The order to decommission the satellite was issued on July 12, 2005, and efforts began at that time. The instruments were turned off in August and the active steps began in September. During decommissioning, the last of the fuel was depleted, the batteries were discharged, the tape recorder was played back one last time, on-board memory was scrubbed and the solar arrays were disconnected from the battery. On the final ERBS contact, during its 114,941st orbit, the attitude and momentum control system was disabled and the power system was put in discharge. The final commands opened the thrusters to allow the remaining fuel to seep out, and the transponders were powered off for the last time.

The satellite is believed to have re-entered the Earth's atmosphere on January 8, 2023, at 6:04 PM HAST over the Bering Sea near the Aleutian Islands. Most of the satellite is believed to have been burned up in the atmosphere, but some large pieces may have survived and fallen to the sea. Prior to re-entry, NASA had estimated the odds that the falling debris would cause any injury at about 1-in-9,400.

== Discoveries ==
SAGE II measured the decline in ozone over Antarctica from the time the ozone hole was first described in 1985. That data was key in the international community's decision-making process during the 1987 Montreal Protocol Agreement, which has resulted in a near elimination of CFCs in industrialized countries. It also created an aerosol data record on polar stratospheric clouds (PSC) which was crucial to understanding the ozone hole process. SAGE II data was used to understand the impact of volcanic aerosols on climate.

== Instruments ==
ERBS carried three instruments the Earth Radiation Budget Experiment (ERBE) Scanner, the ERBE non-scanner and Stratospheric Aerosol and Gas Experiment (SAGE II). ERBE was a continuation of the Radiation Budget studies carried out by Nimbus-6 and 7. SAGE-II was a follow-on to the SAGE satellite which lasted from 1979 to 1981.

ERBS was one of three satellites in the ERBE and it carried two instruments as part of that effort. The ERBE scanner was a set of three detectors that studied longwave radiation, shortwave radiation and total energy radiating from the Earth along a line of the satellite's path. The ERBE non-scanner was a set of five detectors that measured the total energy from the Sun, and the shortwave and total energy from the entire Earth disk and the area beneath the satellite. The other two ERBE missions were included on the NOAA-9 satellite when it was launched in January 1985, and the NOAA-10 satellite when it was launched in October 1986. The ERBE scanner on ERBS stopped functioning on February 2, 1990, and after numerous attempts to recover it, it was powered off for good in March 1991. The non-scanner lost the ability to perform bi-weekly internal and Solar-calibrations, but no degradation in data quality was detected as a result. The non-scanner was powered off on August 22, 2005, in preparation for decommissioning. The Clouds and the Earth's Radiant Energy System (CERES) missions use an enhanced legacy instrument that continues the data record of ERBE. The first of seven CERES instruments was launched in 1997 with NASA's Tropical Rainfall Measuring Mission and the last launched with the Joint Polar Satellite System 1 (JPSS-1) in 2017.

The other instrument on ERBS was the Stratospheric Aerosol and Gas Experiment (SAGE II). SAGE II was the 2nd of 4 SAGE missions, with the most recent one SAGE III-ISS having been installed on the International Space Station in 2017. The SAGE II instrument experienced a failure in July 2000. SAGE II was unable to lock on to either sunrise or sunset events. This was believed to be due to excessively noisy azimuth potentiometer readings in selected azimuth regions. An operational work-around was developed which allowed SAGE II to collect approximately 50 percent of the nominal science data. SAGE-II was powered off in August 2005 in preparation for decommissioning.
