= STS-41-G =

1984 American crewed spaceflight to deploy the Earth Radiation Budget Satellite

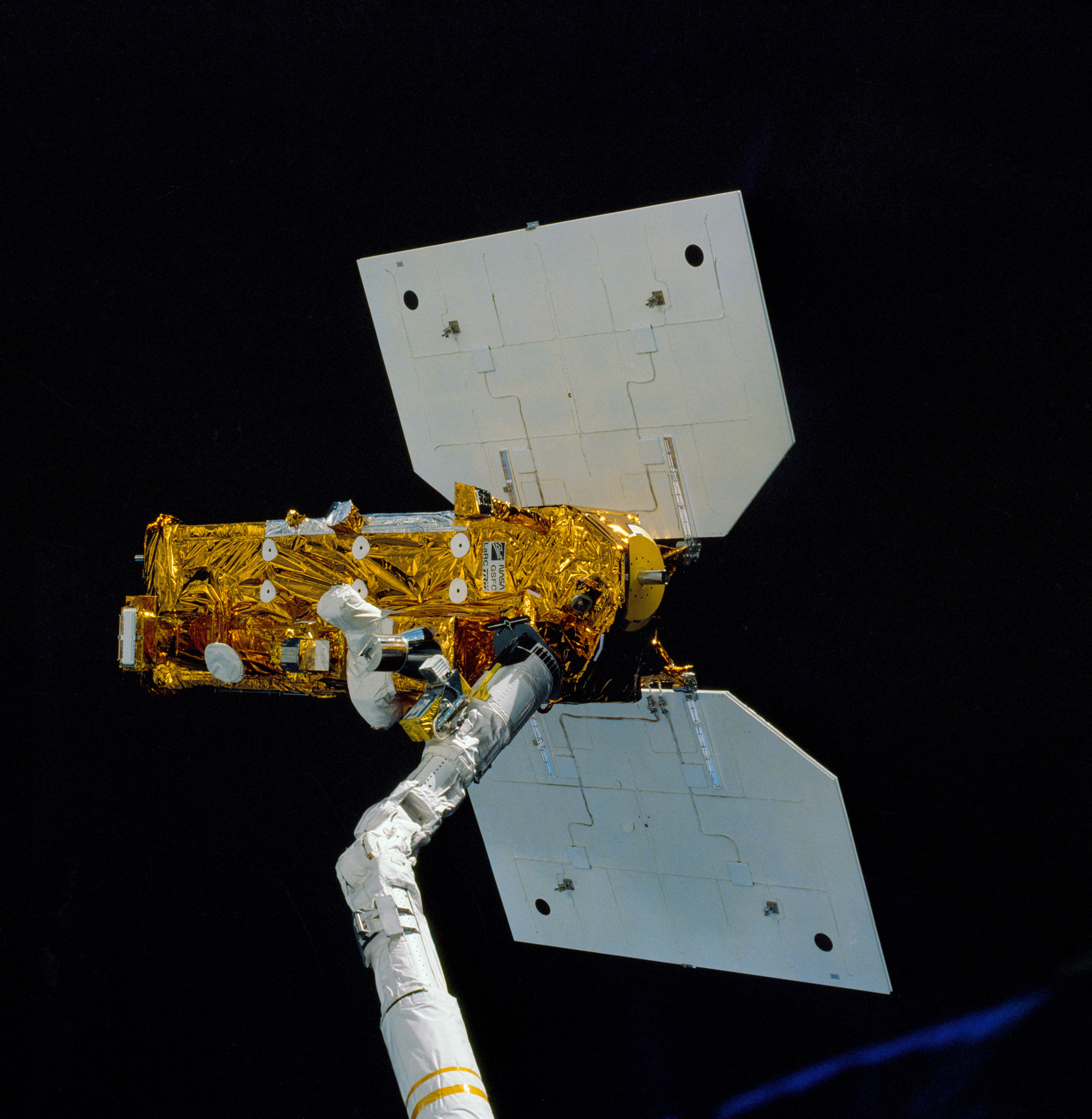
- ERBS during deployment
- Names: Space Transportation System-13
- Mission type: Satellite deployment Radar imaging
- Operator: NASA
- COSPAR ID: 1984-108A
- SATCAT no.: 15353
- Mission duration: 8 days, 5 hours, 23 minutes, 33 seconds
- Distance travelled: 5,293,847 km (3,289,444 mi)
- Orbits completed: 133

Spacecraft properties
- Spacecraft: Space Shuttle Challenger
- Launch mass: 110,120 kg (242,770 lb)
- Landing mass: 91,746 kg (202,265 lb)
- Payload mass: 8,573 kg (18,900 lb)

Crew
- Crew size: 7
- Members: Robert L. Crippen; Jon A. McBride; Kathryn D. Sullivan; Sally K. Ride; David C. Leestma; Paul D. Scully-Power; Marc Garneau
- EVAs: 1
- EVA duration: 3 hours, 29 minutes

Start of mission
- Launch date: October 5, 1984, 11:03:00 UTC (7:03 am EDT)
- Launch site: Kennedy, LC-39A
- Contractor: Rockwell International

End of mission
- Landing date: October 13 1984, 16:26:33 UTC (12:26:38 pm EDT)
- Landing site: Kennedy, SLF Runway 33

Orbital parameters
- Reference system: Geocentric orbit
- Regime: Low Earth orbit
- Perigee altitude: 351 km (218 mi)
- Apogee altitude: 391 km (243 mi)
- Inclination: 57°
- Period: 92 minutes

Instruments
- Getaway Special (GAS) canisters; Large Format Camera (LFC); Shuttle Imaging Radar (SIR-B)
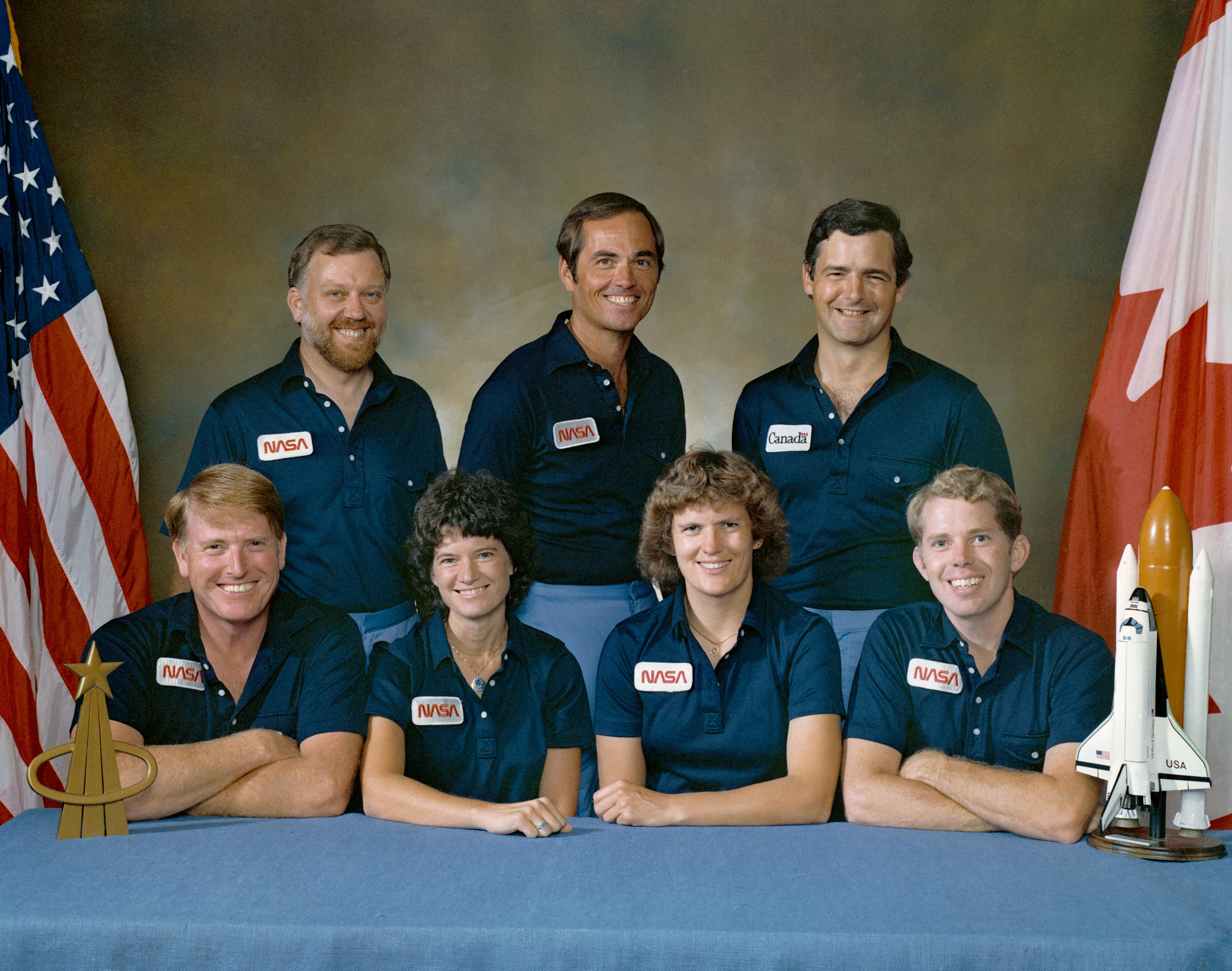
- STS-41-G mission patch Top: Scully-Power, Crippen and Garneau; Bottom: McBride, Ride, Sullivan and Leestma. The gold astronaut pin replica near McBride signifies Unity. Space Shuttle program

STS-41-G (formerly STS-17) was the 13th flight of NASA's Space Shuttle program and the sixth flight of Space Shuttle Challenger. Challenger launched on October 5, 1984, and conducted the second shuttle landing at Kennedy Space Center on October 13, 1984. It was the first shuttle mission to carry a crew of seven, including the first crew with two women (Sally K. Ride and Kathryn D. Sullivan), the first American Extravehicular activity (EVA) involving a woman (Sullivan), the first Australian-born person to journey into space as well as the first astronaut with a beard (Paul D. Scully-Power) and the first Canadian astronaut (Marc Garneau).

STS-41-G was the third shuttle mission to carry an IMAX camera on board to document the flight. Launch and in-orbit footage from the mission (including Sullivan and Leestma's EVA) appeared in the 1985 IMAX movie The Dream is Alive.

== Crew ==
Position	Astronaut
Commander	(United States) Robert L. Crippen; Fourth and last spaceflight
Pilot	(United States) Jon McBride; Only spaceflight
Mission Specialist 1	(United States) Kathryn D. Sullivan; First spaceflight
Mission Specialist 2 Flight Engineer	(United States) Sally Ride; Second and last spaceflight
Mission Specialist 3	(United States) David Leestma; First spaceflight
Payload Specialist 1	(United States) / (Australia) Paul Scully-Power; Only spaceflight Sponsor: US Navy
Payload Specialist 2	(Canada) Marc Garneau; First spaceflight Sponsor: National Research Council

Backup crew
Position	Astronaut
Payload Specialist 1	(United States) Robert E. Stevenson
Payload Specialist 2	(Canada) Robert Thirsk, NRC

=== Spacewalk ===
- Personnel: Leestma and Sullivan
- Date: October 11, 1984 (≈15:30–19:00 UTC)
- Duration: 3 hours, 29 minutes

=== Crew seat assignments ===
Seat	Launch	Landing	Seats 1–4 are on the flight deck. Seats 5–7 are on the mid-deck.
1	Crippen		Seats 1–4 are on the flight deck. Seats 5–7 are on the mid-deck.
2	McBride		Seats 1–4 are on the flight deck. Seats 5–7 are on the mid-deck.
3	Sullivan	Leestma	Seats 1–4 are on the flight deck. Seats 5–7 are on the mid-deck.
4	Ride		Seats 1–4 are on the flight deck. Seats 5–7 are on the mid-deck.
5	Leestma	Sullivan	Seats 1–4 are on the flight deck. Seats 5–7 are on the mid-deck.
6	Scully-Power		Seats 1–4 are on the flight deck. Seats 5–7 are on the mid-deck.
7	Garneau		Seats 1–4 are on the flight deck. Seats 5–7 are on the mid-deck.

== Mission summary ==
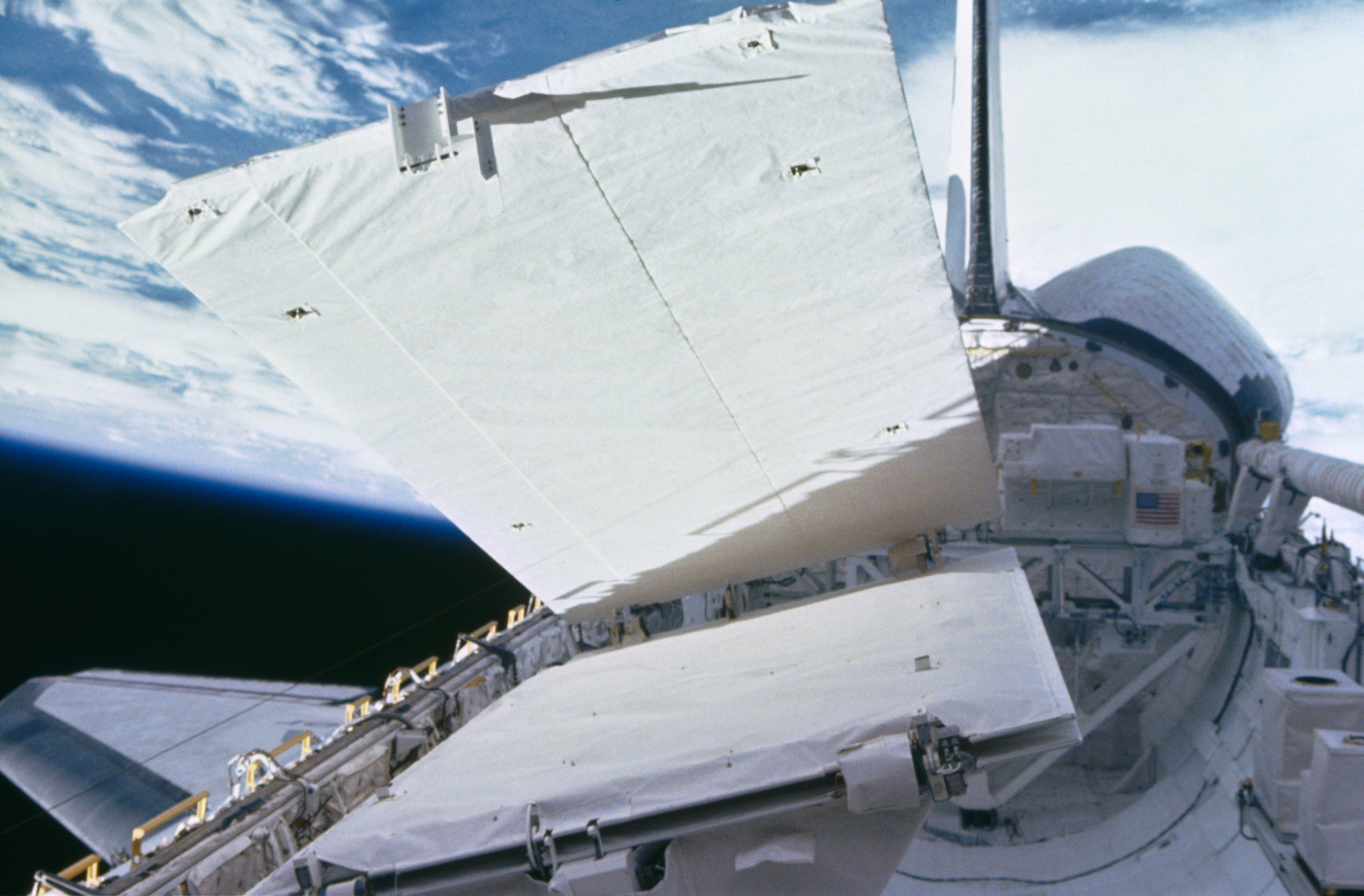
SIR-B antenna deployment

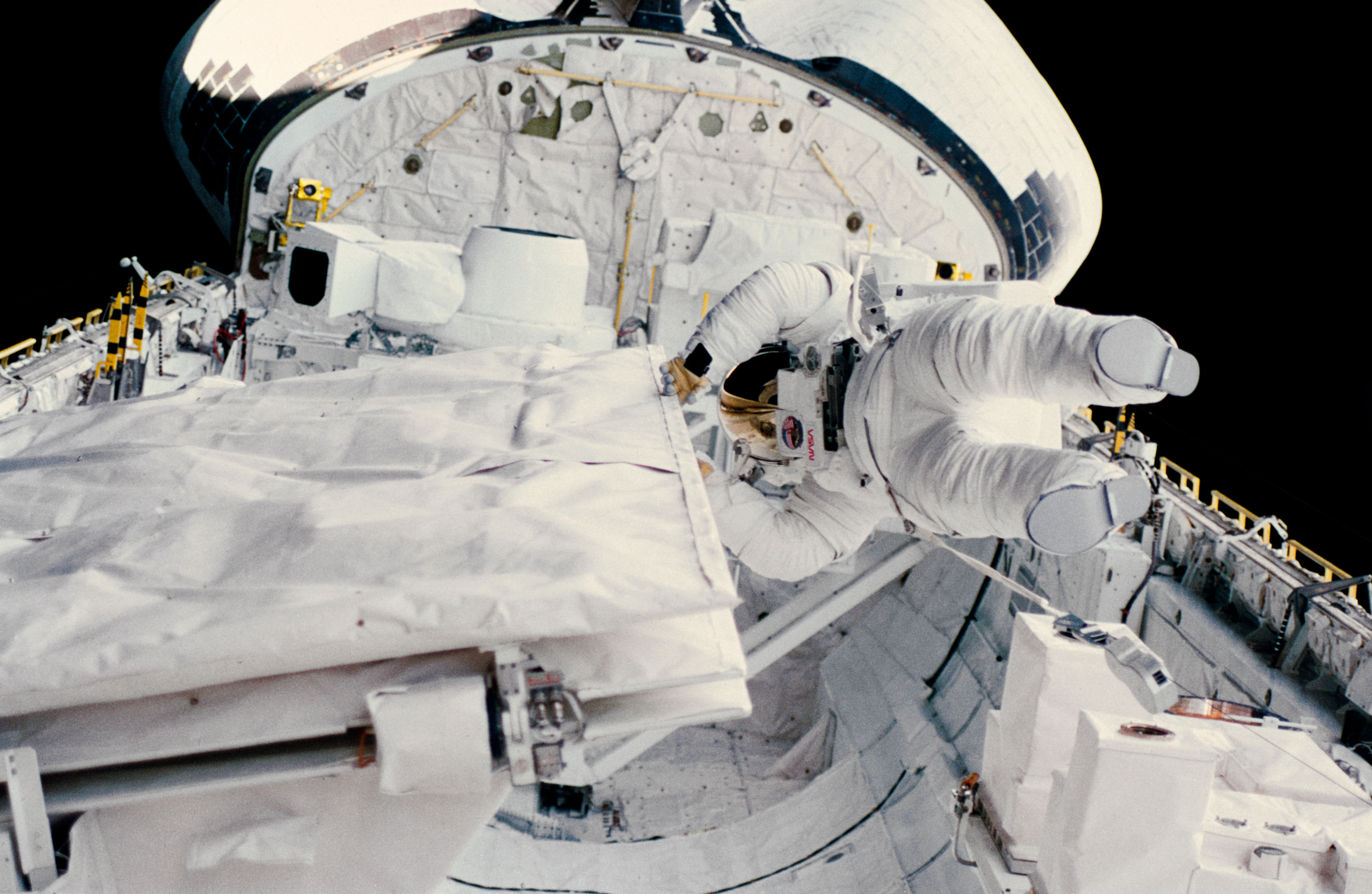
Sullivan during the EVA

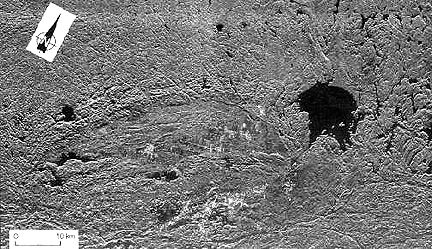
Sample image taken using the SIR-B over Canada.

On October 5, 1984, Challenger launched from the Kennedy Space Center at 7:03:00 a.m. EDT, marking the start of the STS-41-G mission. On board were seven crew members – the largest flight crew ever to fly on a single spacecraft at that time. They included commander Robert L. Crippen, making his fourth Shuttle flight and second in six months (Crippen became the first American astronaut to complete two space missions in the same calendar year); pilot Jon A. McBride; three mission specialists – David C. Leestma, Sally K. Ride and Kathryn D. Sullivan – and two payload specialists, Paul D. Scully-Power and Marc Garneau, the first Canadian citizen to serve as a Shuttle crew member, as well as the first Canadian in space. The mission also marked the first time two female astronauts had flown together.

Sullivan became the first American woman to walk in space when she and Leestma performed a 3-hour Extravehicular activity (EVA) on October 11, 1984, demonstrating the Orbital Refueling System (ORS) and proving the feasibility of refueling satellites in orbit.

Nine hours after liftoff, the 2,307 kg (5,086 lb) Earth Radiation Budget Satellite (ERBS) was deployed from the payload bay by the Canadarm robot arm, and its on-board thrusters boosted it into orbit 560 km (350 mi) above the Earth. ERBS was the first of three planned satellites designed to measure the amount of energy received from the Sun and reradiated into space. It also studied the seasonal movement of energy from the tropics to the polar regions.

Another major mission activity was the operation of the Shuttle Imaging Radar-B (SIR-B). The SIR-B was part of the OSTA-3 experiment package in the payload bay, which also included the Large Format Camera (LFC) to photograph the Earth, another camera called MAPS which measured air pollution, and a feature identification and location experiment called FILE, which consisted of two TV cameras and two 70 mm (2.8 in) still cameras.

The SIR-B was an improved version of a similar device flown on the OSTA-1 package during STS-2. It had an eight-panel antenna array measuring 11 × 2 m (36.1 × 6.6 ft). It operated throughout the flight, but problems were encountered with Challenger's Ku-band antenna, and therefore much of the data had to be recorded on board the orbiter rather than transmitted to Earth in real-time as was originally planned.

Payload Specialist Scully-Power, an employee of the U.S. Naval Research Laboratory (NRL), performed a series of oceanography observations during the mission. Garneau conducted a series of experiments sponsored by the Canadian government, called CANEX, which were related to medical, atmospheric, climatic, materials and robotic science. A number of Getaway Special (GAS) canisters, covering a wide variety of materials testing and physics experiments, were also flown.

A claim was later made that the Soviet Terra-3 laser testing center was used to track Challenger with a low-power laser on October 10, 1984. This supposedly caused the malfunction of on-board equipment and the temporary blinding of the crew, leading to a U.S. diplomatic protest. However, this story has been comprehensively denied by the crew members. In 2022, former Soviet Minister of Industry informed the Russian press that the Soviets had used a laser locator to lock onto the shuttle and hold the lock until it was 800 km from the test site.

During the 8 days, 5 hours, 23 minutes, and 33 seconds mission, Challenger traveled 5,293,847 km (3,289,444 mi) and completed 133 orbits. It landed at the Shuttle Landing Facility (SLF) at Kennedy Space Center – becoming the second shuttle mission to land there – on October 13, 1984, at 12:26 p.m. EDT.

The STS-41-G mission was later described in detail in the book Oceans to Orbit: The Story of Australia's First Man in Space, Paul Scully-Power by space historian Colin Burgess.

Almost forty years after the flight, one of the OMS engines installed on Challenger for STS-41-G was reused and repurposed as the main engine for the Orion capsule on the Artemis I test flight around the Moon. The engine fired multiple times to adjust altitude and velocity, including bringing the capsule into and out of a Distant Retrograde Orbit around the Moon.

== Mission insignia ==
The thirteen complete stars in the blue field of the U.S. flag of the mission insignia symbolize the flight's numerical designation in the Space Transportation System's mission sequence and being essentially the 13th undertaken flight, by 'obscuring' the remaining stars. (The 17 stars in the black field were indicative of the flight's original designation as STS-17.) Central, as if it is launching, is an astronaut insignia in gold, which was presented to each astronaut since Project Mercury, after completing their first spaceflight, as a reference to the mostly rookie crew. Gender symbols are placed next to each astronaut's name (the male symbol was 'buffed up' as to make it feasible to visualize on the patch), and a Canadian flag icon is placed next to Garneau's name.

== Wake-up calls ==
NASA began a tradition of playing music to astronauts during the Project Gemini, and first used music to wake up a flight crew during Apollo 15. Each track is specially chosen, often by the astronauts' families, and usually has a special meaning to an individual member of the crew, or is applicable to their daily activities.

Flight Day	Song	Artist/Composer
Day 2	"Flashdance... What a Feeling"	Irene Cara
Day 3	"Theme From Rocky"	Bill Conti

== See also ==
- List of human spaceflights
- List of Space Shuttle missions

== Bibliography ==
- Cooper, Henry S. F., Jr., Before Lift-off: The Making of a Space Shuttle Crew, Johns Hopkins University Press 1987 (Cooper's report on the selection, forming and training of the STS-41-G crew)
