= Explorer 60 =

NASA satellite of the Explorer program

SAGE
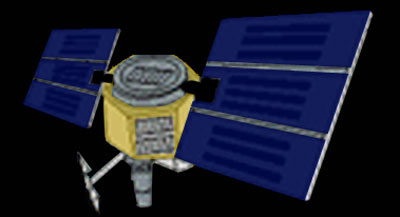
- Explorer 60 (SAGE) satellite
- Names: Explorer 60; AEM-B; Applications Explorer Mission-B
- Mission type: Earth science
- Operator: NASA
- COSPAR ID: 1979-013A
- SATCAT no.: 11270
- Mission duration: 1 year (planned); 3 years (achieved)

Spacecraft properties
- Spacecraft: Explorer LX
- Spacecraft type: Stratospheric Aerosol and Gas Experiment
- Bus: SAGE
- Manufacturer: Langley Research Center
- Launch mass: 148.7 kg (328 lb)
- Power: Solar panels and batteries

Start of mission
- Launch date: 18 February 1979, 16:18 UTC
- Rocket: Scout D-1 (S-202C)
- Launch site: Wallops, LA-3A
- Contractor: Vought
- Entered service: 18 February 1979

End of mission
- Last contact: 7 January 1982
- Decay date: 11 April 1989

Orbital parameters
- Reference system: Geocentric orbit
- Regime: Low Earth orbit
- Perigee altitude: 547.5 km (340.2 mi)
- Apogee altitude: 660.2 km (410.2 mi)
- Inclination: 54.90°
- Period: 96.80 minutes

Instruments
- Stratospheric Aerosol and Gas Experiment (SAGE)

Explorer 60, also called SAGE (Stratospheric Aerosol and Gas Experiment) and was the second of the Applications Explorer Missions (AEM), AEM-B (Applications Explorer Mission-B), was a NASA scientific satellite launched on 18 February 1979, from Wallops Flight Facility (WFF) by a Scout D-1 launch vehicle.

== Spacecraft ==
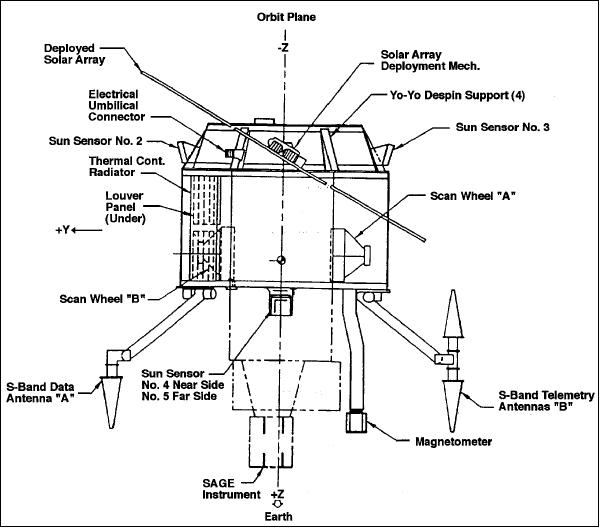
Explorer 60 / SAGE spacecraft

Explorer 60 had a launch mass of 148.7 kg (328 lb). The spacecraft was designed for a 1-year life in orbit. Explorer 60 was a small, versatile, and low-cost spacecraft made of two distinct parts: (1) the SAGE instrument module containing the detectors and the associated hardware, and (2) the base module containing the necessary data handling, power, communications, command, and attitude control subsystem to support the instrument mode. The base module includes the telemetry data system and a communications subsystem that makes use of a conical log spiral S-band antenna and two Very high frequency (VHF) antennas.

== Mission ==
The objective of the SAGE mission was to obtain stratospheric aerosol and ozone data on a global scale for a better understanding of the Earth's environmental quality and radiation budget.

== Experiment ==
=== Stratospheric Aerosol and Gas Experiment (SAGE) ===
The objectives of the Stratospheric Aerosol and Gas Experiment (SAGE) were to determine the spatial distribution of stratospheric aerosols and ozone on a global scale. Specific objectives were (1) to develop a satellite-based remote-sensing technique for stratospheric aerosols and ozone measurements, (2) to map aerosol and ozone concentrations on a time scale shorter than major stratospheric changes, (3) to locate stratospheric aerosol and ozone sources and sinks, (4) to monitor circulation and transfer phenomena, (5) to observe hemisphere differences, and (6) to investigate the optical properties of aerosols and assess their effects on global climate. The SAGE instrument was a radiometer consisting of a gregorian telescope and a detector subassembly which measured the attenuation of solar radiation at four wavelengths (0.385, 0.45, 0.6, and 1.0 micrometre) during solar occultation. As the spacecraft emerged from the Earth's shadow, the sensor scanned the atmosphere of Earth from the horizon up and measured the attenuation of solar radiation by different atmospheric layers. This procedure was repeated during spacecraft sunset. Two vertical scannings were obtained during each orbit, with each scan requiring approximately 1 minute of time to cover the atmosphere above the troposphere. The instrument had a field of view of approximately 0.15 milliradian which resulted in a vertical resolution of about 1 km (0.62 mi). Spatial coverage extended from about 79°N to 79°S latitude and thus complemented the coverage (64°N to 80°N and 64°S to 80°S) of the SAM II on Nimbus 7. The instrument performed satisfactorily. Because of power problems, the data collection was limited to sunset events after June 1979, and was eventually terminated on 18 November 1981.

== Results ==
Explorer 60 experienced power problems after 15 May 1979. However, the spacecraft operations continued until 19 November 1981. Explorer 60 detected and tracked also 5 volcanic eruption plumes that penetrated the stratosphere. It determined the amount of new material for each volcano added to the stratosphere. The signal from the spacecraft was last received on 7 January 1982, when the battery failed. On 11 April 1989, the spacecraft decayed in the atmosphere.

== See also ==
- Explorer program
