= SpaceX CRS-10 =

2017 American resupply spaceflight to the ISS

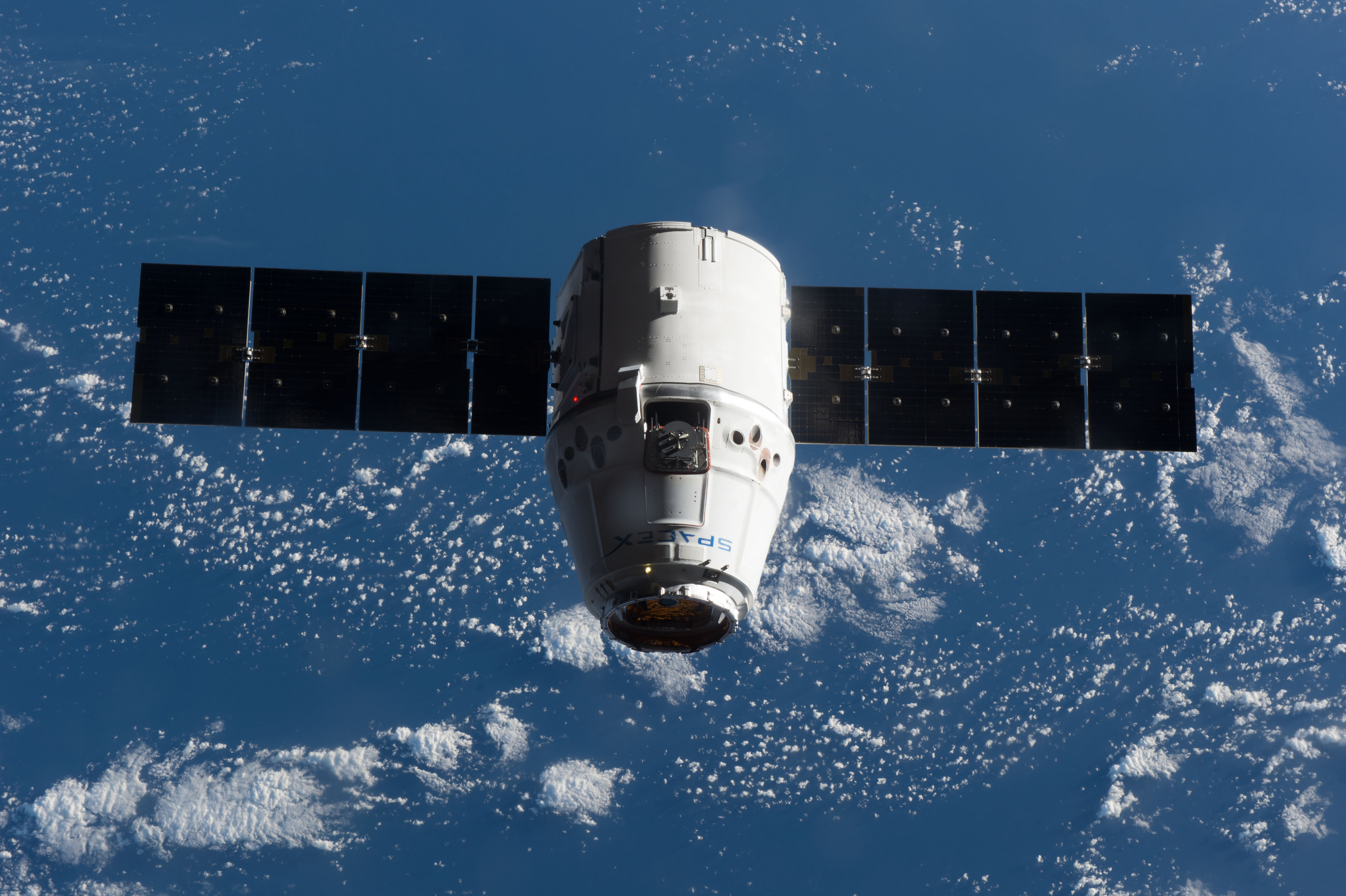
- Dragon approaching the ISS on 23 February 2017
- Names: SpX-10
- Mission type: ISS resupply
- Operator: SpaceX
- COSPAR ID: 2017-009A
- SATCAT no.: 42053
- Mission duration: 28 days, 7 minutes

Spacecraft properties
- Spacecraft: Dragon 1 C112
- Spacecraft type: Dragon 1
- Manufacturer: SpaceX
- Dry mass: 4,200 kg (9,300 lb)
- Dimensions: Height: 7.2 m (24 ft); Diameter: 3.7 m (12 ft)

Start of mission
- Launch date: 19 February 2017, 14:39:00 UTC
- Rocket: Falcon 9 Full Thrust (B1031)
- Launch site: Kennedy Space Center, LC-39A
- Contractor: SpaceX

End of mission
- Disposal: Recovered
- Landing date: 19 March 2017, 14:46 UTC
- Landing site: Pacific Ocean, 320 km (200 mi) SW of Long Beach, California

Orbital parameters
- Reference system: Geocentric
- Regime: Low Earth
- Semi-major axis: 6,783.13 km (4,214.84 mi)
- Eccentricity: 0.000715
- Perigee altitude: 400.14 km (248.64 mi)
- Apogee altitude: 409.85 km (254.67 mi)
- Inclination: 51.6402°
- Period: 92.7 minutes
- Epoch: 2 March 2017, 13:20:36 UTC

Berthing at ISS
- Berthing port: Harmony nadir
- RMS capture: 23 February 2017, 10:44 UTC
- Berthing date: 23 February 2017, 13:12 UTC
- Unberthing date: 18 March 2017, 21:20 UTC
- RMS release: 19 March 2017, 09:11 UTC
- Time berthed: 23 days, 8 hours, 8 minutes

Cargo
- Mass: 2,490 kg (5,490 lb)
- Pressurised: 1,530 kg (3,373 lb)
- Unpressurised: 960 kg (2,116 lb)
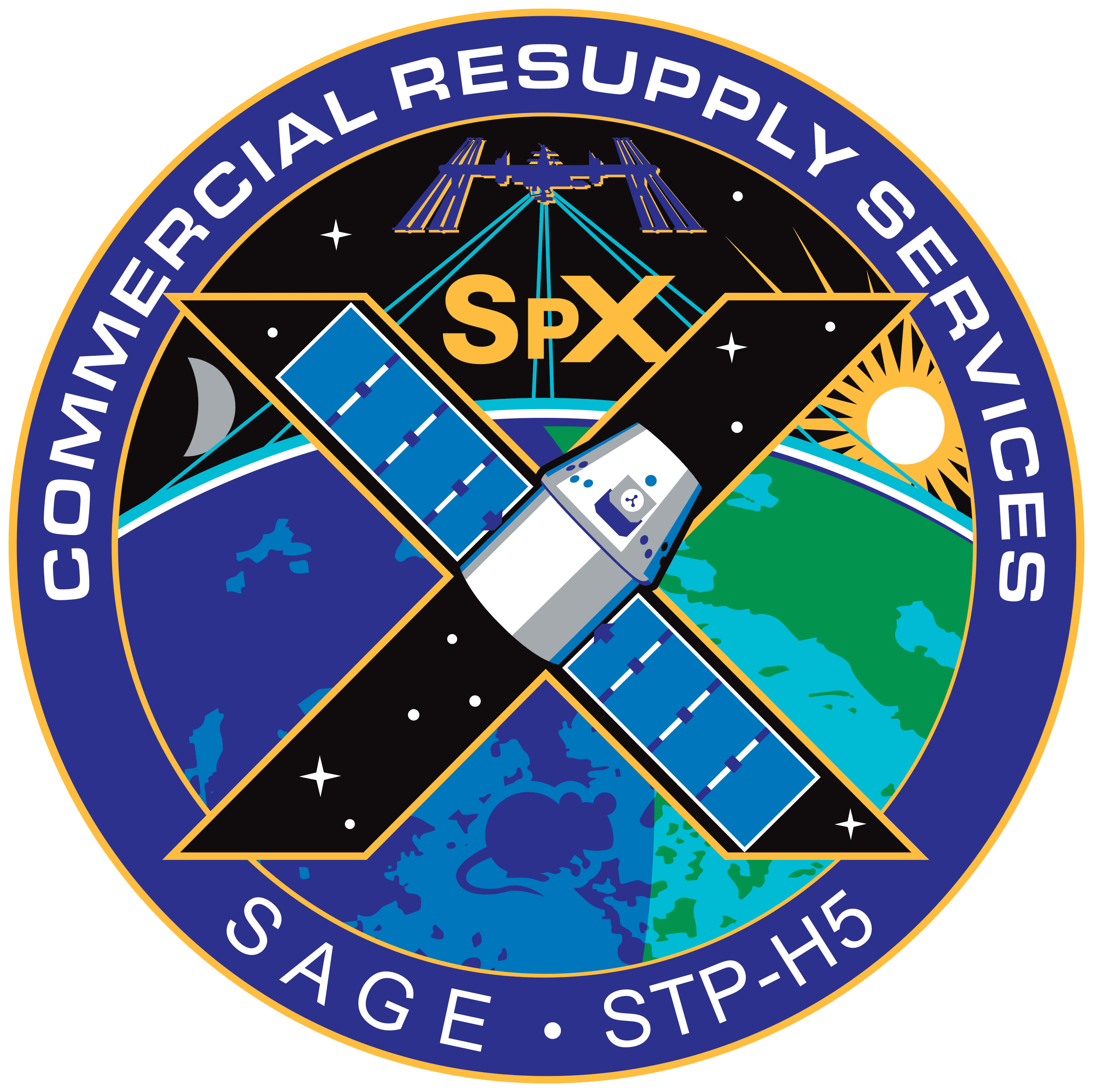
- NASA SpX-10 mission patch Commercial Resupply Services Cargo Dragon

SpaceX CRS-10, also known as SpX-10, was a Dragon Commercial Resupply Service mission to the International Space Station (ISS) which launched on 19 February 2017. The mission was contracted by NASA as part of its Commercial Resupply Services program and was launched by SpaceX aboard the 30th flight of the Falcon 9 rocket. The mission ended on 19 March 2017 when the Dragon spacecraft left the ISS and safely returned to Earth.

== Operations history ==
CRS-10 is part of the original order of twelve missions awarded to SpaceX under the Commercial Resupply Services contract. In June 2016, a NASA Inspector General report had this mission manifested for November 2016. The launch was then put on hold pending investigation of the pad explosion in September 2016, with a tentative date no earlier than January 2017, subsequently set for 18 February.

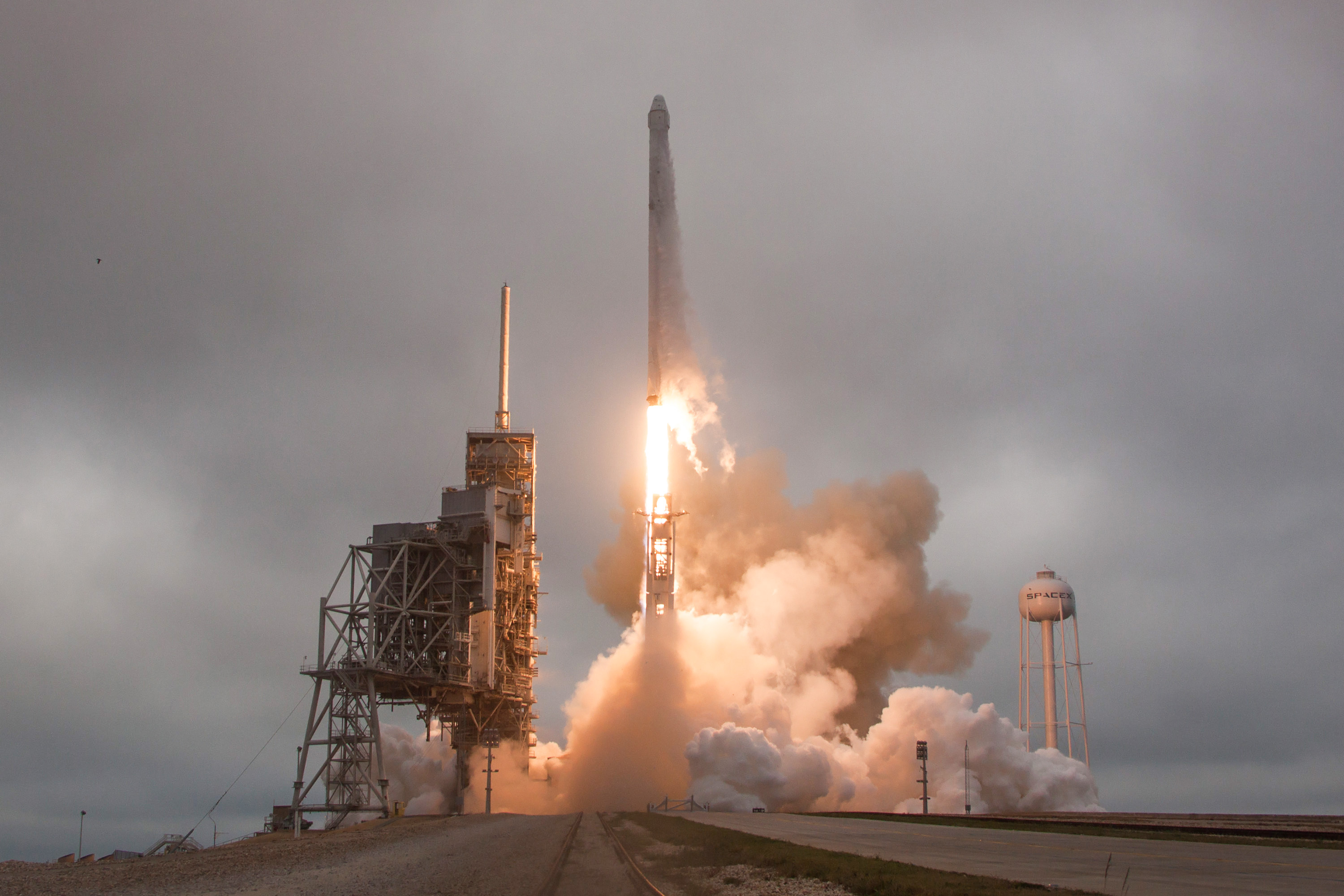
Launch of CRS-10 from LC-39A

On 12 February 2017, SpaceX successfully completed a static fire test of the Falcon 9 engines on Pad 39A. An initial launch attempt on 18 February 2017 was scrubbed 13 seconds before its 15:01:32 UTC launch due to a thrust vector control system issue in the rocket's second stage, resulting in a 24-hour hold for launch no earlier than 19 February at 14:39 UTC. The faulty actuator was repaired at the launch pad overnight, and the rocket was returned to vertical approximately six hours before the scheduled launch time.

CRS-10 was launched from Kennedy Space Center Launch Complex 39 Pad A on 19 February 2017 at 14:39 UTC, the first launch from the complex since STS-135 on 8 July 2011, the last flight of the Space Shuttle program, and the first uncrewed mission from the site since the launch of the Skylab space station on 14 May 1973; this complex is also where the Apollo missions were launched.

Following the successful launch, the first stage proceeded through a three-burn flyback and landed safely in Landing Zone 1, the first daytime landing of a Falcon rocket on land.

The Dragon spacecraft rendezvoused with the International Space Station on 22 February, but its approach was automatically aborted by an on-board computer at 08:25 UTC when a data error was reported in its navigation system. This is the first rendezvous abort by a Dragon spacecraft. The problem was traced to an incorrect data value in the spacecraft's Global Positioning System, critical to operations as this data informs the vehicle of its relative position to the space station. The abort resulted in a 24-hour hold on its approach. The error was corrected in this time, during which the spacecraft entered a "racetrack" trajectory around the station to reset its approach. An error-free second attempt resulted in Dragon being captured by the station's Canadarm2 on 23 February at 10:44 UTC, with berthing to the Harmony module taking place a few hours later at 13:12 UTC. This abort was later revealed in a NASA Inspector General audit to have resulted from incompatibilities between NASA's and SpaceX's software development processes.

The CRS-10 mission ended on 19 March 2017. The Dragon spacecraft was detached from the International Space Station by Canadarm2 on 18 March 2017 at 21:20 UTC, moved to a stow position below the station where it stayed overnight, and was released at 09:11 UTC. Dragon performed three departure burns to move it away from the station before conducting a final de-orbit burn at around 14:00 UTC. The spacecraft splashed down in the Pacific Ocean at 14:46 UTC, about 320 km (200 mi) southwest from Long Beach, California.

Dragon returned 1,652 kg (3,642 lb) of material from the ISS, including research samples, science and crew equipment, and spacewalking hardware. Also removed from the station was 811 kg (1,788 lb) of external payload—including a MISSE module, the OPALS experiment, and Robotic Refueling Mission demonstration equipment—which was placed in Dragon's unpressurized trunk and disposed of when the trunk section burned up on re-entry.

== Primary payload ==
NASA contracted the CRS-10 mission from SpaceX and therefore determined the primary payload, date/time of launch, and orbital parameters for the Dragon space capsule. CRS-10 carried a total of 2,490 kg (5,490 lb) of cargo to the International Space Station, including 1,530 kg (3,373 lb) of pressurized cargo including packaging and 960 kg (2,116 lb) of unpressurized cargo. External payloads on the CRS-10 spacecraft are the SAGE III Earth observation experiment and its Nadir Viewing Platform (NVP), and the U.S. Department of Defense's Space Test Program Houston 5 (STP-H5) package including the Raven navigation investigation and the Lightning Imaging Sensor. Some science payloads include ACME, LMM Biophysics, ZBOT, and CIR/Cool Flames.

The following is a breakdown of cargo bound for the ISS:

- Science investigations: 732 kg (1,614 lb)
- Crew supplies: 296 kg (653 lb)
- Vehicle hardware: 382 kg (842 lb)
- Spacewalk equipment: 10 kg (22 lb)
- Computer resources: 11 kg (24 lb)
- Russian hardware: 22 kg (49 lb)
- External payloads:
  - SAGE-III: 527 kg (1,162 lb)
  - STP-H5: 433 kg (955 lb)

== Trial of new flight safety system ==
SpaceX's CRS-10 launch was the "first operational use" of the Autonomous Flight Safety System (AFSS) on "either of Air Force Space Command's Eastern or Western Ranges." AFSS is replacing "the ground-based mission flight control personnel and equipment with on-board Positioning, Navigation and Timing sources and decision logic. The benefits of AFSS include increased public safety, reduced reliance on range infrastructure, reduced range spacelift cost, increased schedule predictability and availability, operational flexibility, and launch slot flexibility." The system consists of software developed by NASA, the Air Force, and DARPA, to which SpaceX adds an additional software layer customized for its rocket. AFSS has flown on 13 previous Falcon 9 missions in a so-called "shadow mode" for testing.

== Gallery ==
SpaceX CRS-10
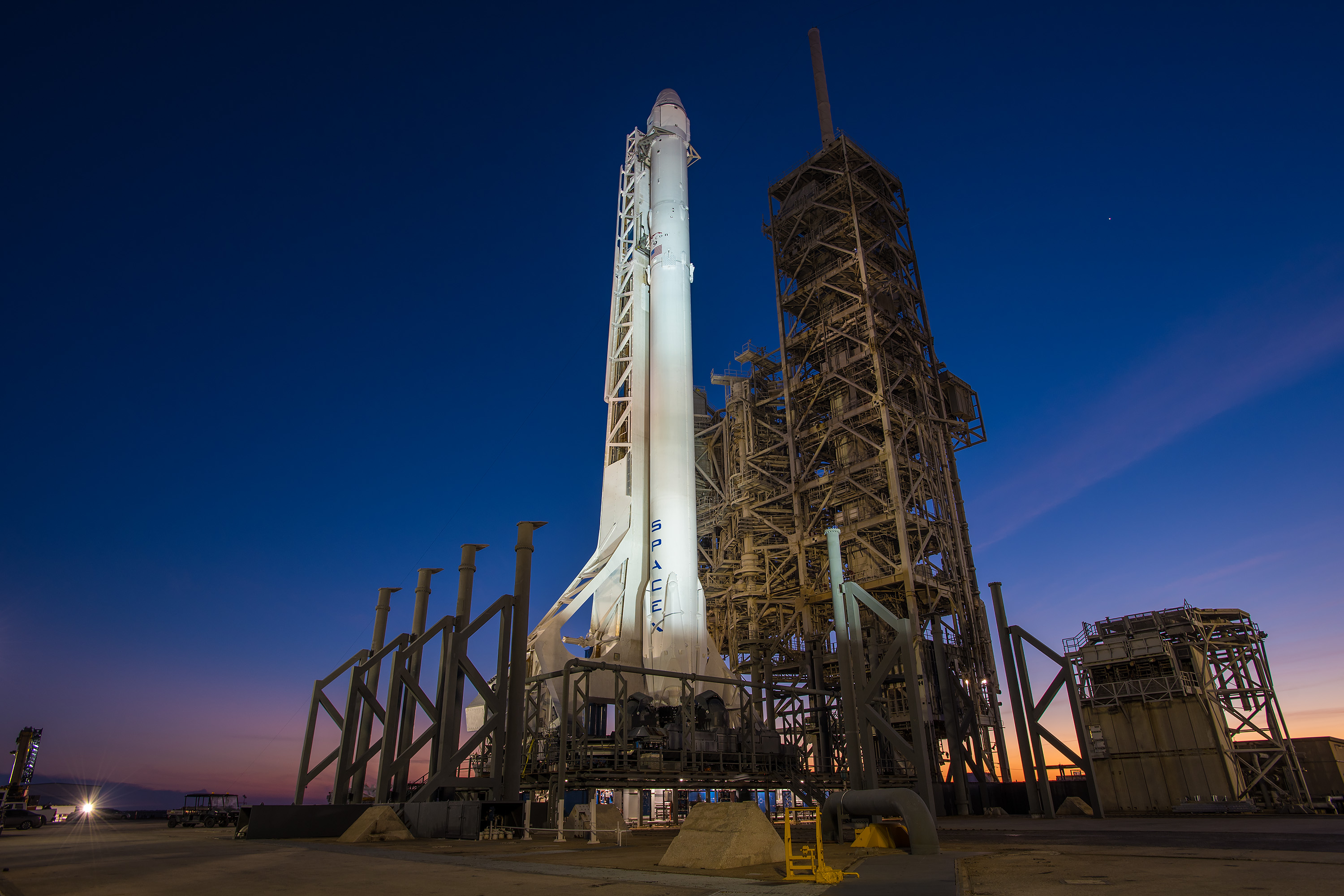
CRS-10 at LC-39A before launch

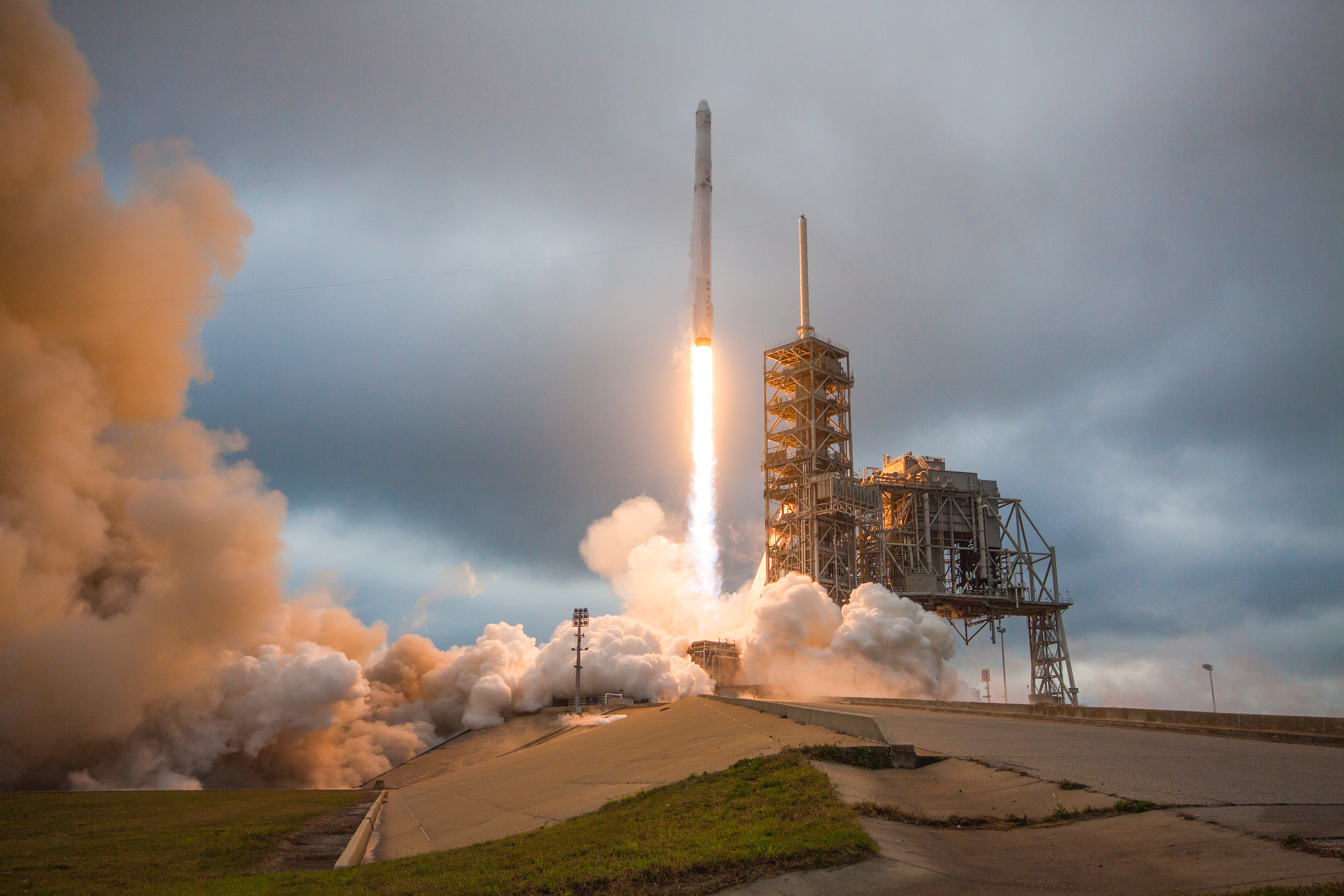
Launch of CRS-10

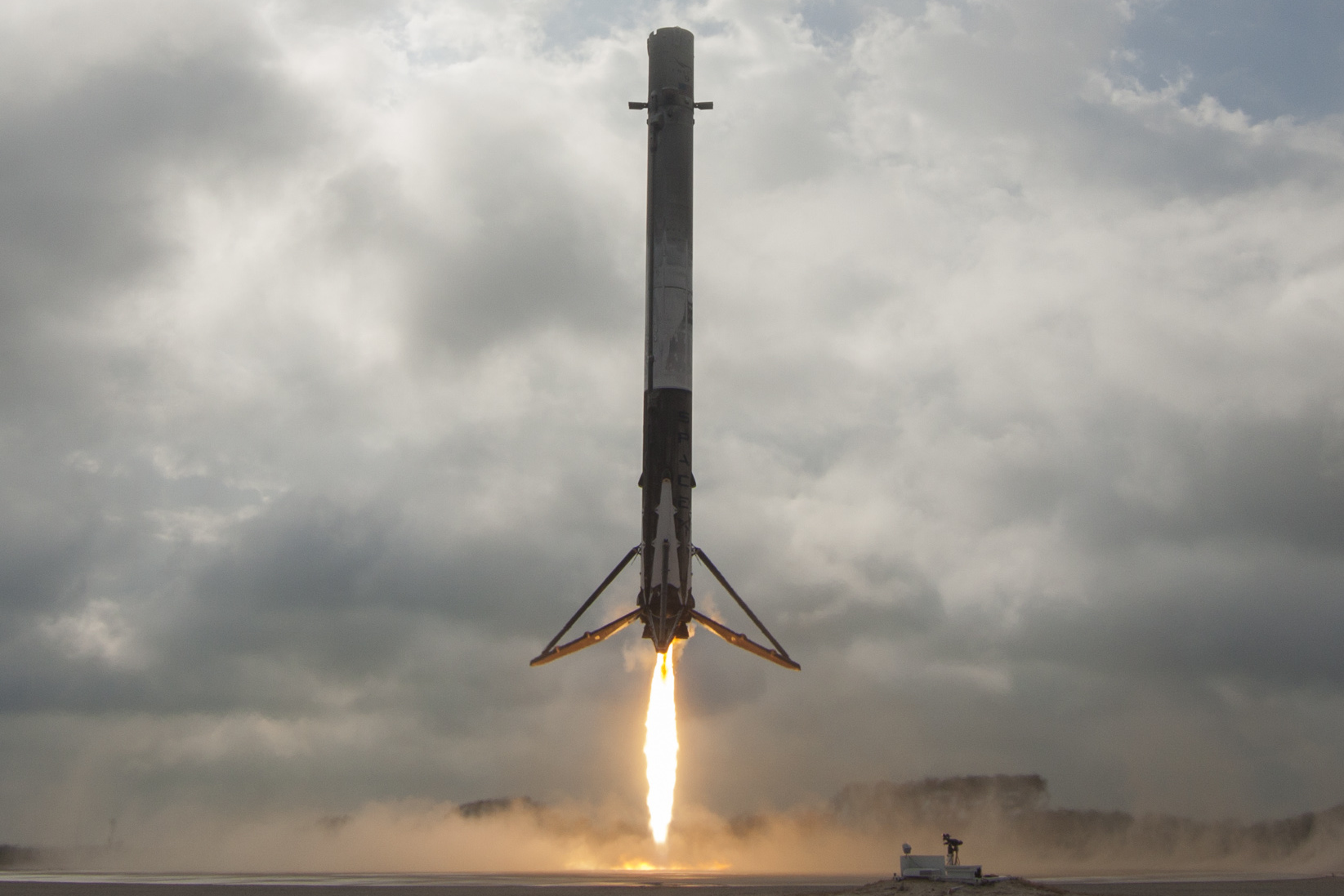
Falcon 9 landing at LZ-1

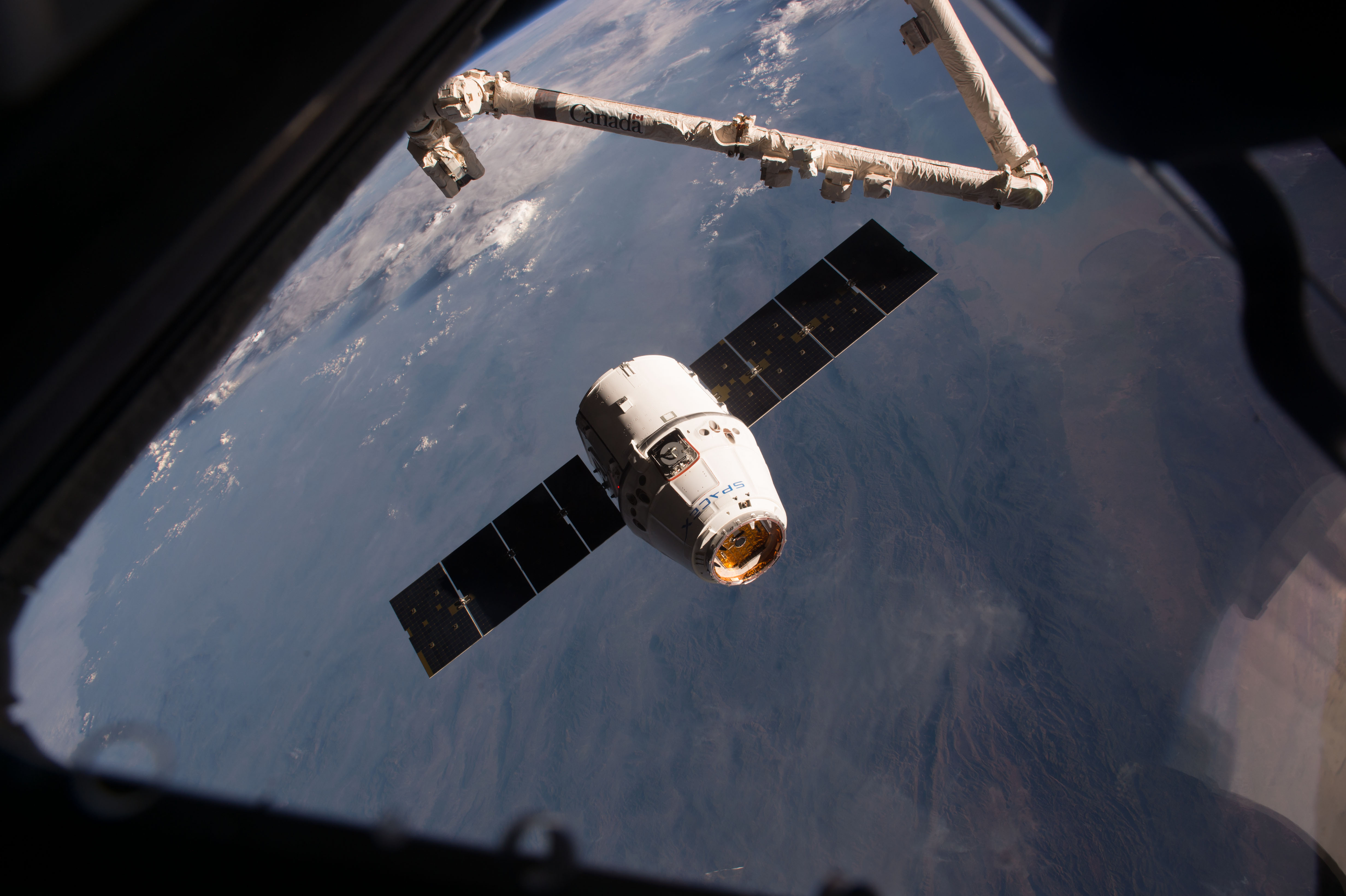
Dragon approaching the ISS

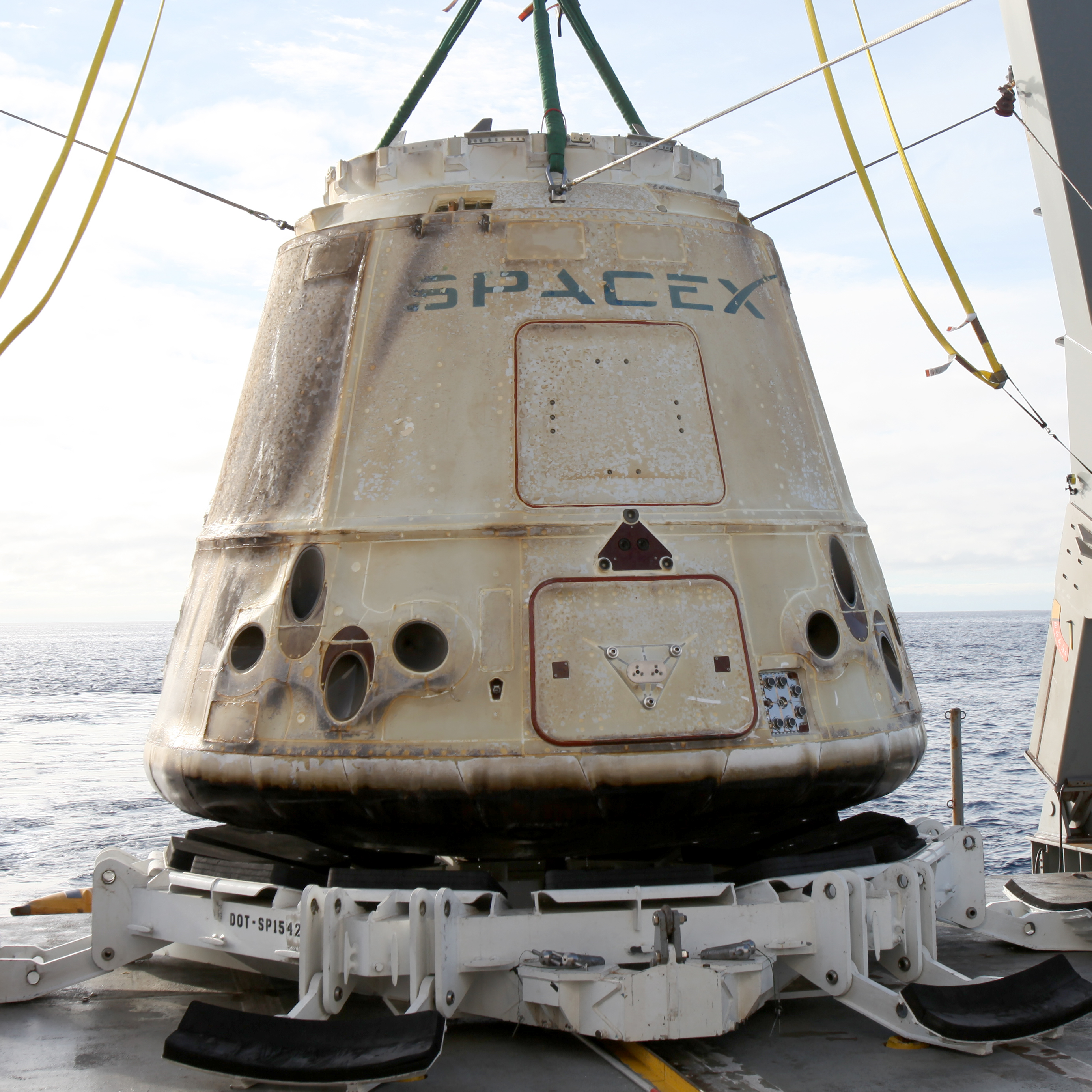
Dragon after landing

== See also ==
- Uncrewed spaceflights to the International Space Station
- List of Falcon 9 and Falcon Heavy launches
