= Richard E. Lawyer =

American test pilot and USAF colonel (1932-2005)

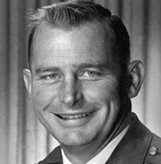
- Born: November 8, 1932; Los Angeles, California, U.S.
- Died: November 12, 2005 (aged 73); Palmdale, California, U.S.
- Resting place: Arlington National Cemetery
- Other name: Richard Earl Lawyer
- Education: UC Berkeley, B.S. 1955
- Occupations: Fighter pilot, test pilot
- Space career

USAF astronaut
- Rank: Colonel, USAF
- Selection: 1965 USAF MOL Group 1
- Mission: None

Richard Earl "Dick" Lawyer (November 8, 1932 – November 12, 2005) was a USAF astronaut, test pilot, and combat veteran. Although he trained for the USAF Manned Orbital Laboratory (MOL), the program was cancelled before any of the MOL crews reached space.

== Early years ==
Lawyer was born November 8, 1932, in Los Angeles, California. He attended the University of California, Berkeley and received a Bachelor of Science degree in mechanical engineering in 1955.

== Career ==
Dick was the kind of guy who, if you gave him something to do and you put a brick wall in front of him, he would go through that wall to get it done.

— Lachlan Macleay, describing his MOL colleague.

After graduating from college, Lawyer joined the U.S. Air Force and trained as a fighter pilot. He was a distinguished graduate of the Air Force Fighter Weapons School and served two combat tours during the Vietnam War. On his first tour early in the conflict, Lawyer served as a forward air controller directing air strikes against enemy troops. He served his second tour later in the war as an F-4 pilot and fought in Operation Linebacker.

Lawyer became involved in flight test in 1958 when his squadron was selected to test the F-105B. He attended the Air Force Aerospace Research Pilot School (now the USAF Test Pilot School) at Edwards AFB and graduated with Class 63A receiving the school's A.B. Honts Award as the outstanding member of his class for academic achievement and flying excellence. In 1965, Lawyer was selected as one of the first astronauts to the Air Force's classified Manned Orbital Laboratory. The MOL program, canceled in 1969 before sending any astronauts into space, was to man a military space station with Air Force astronauts using a modified Gemini spacecraft. Unable to transfer to NASA due to age restrictions, Lawyer did not achieve his goal of space flight, but continued flying for the Air Force. He retired from USAF service in 1982 as a Colonel.

== Lost spacesuits recovered ==
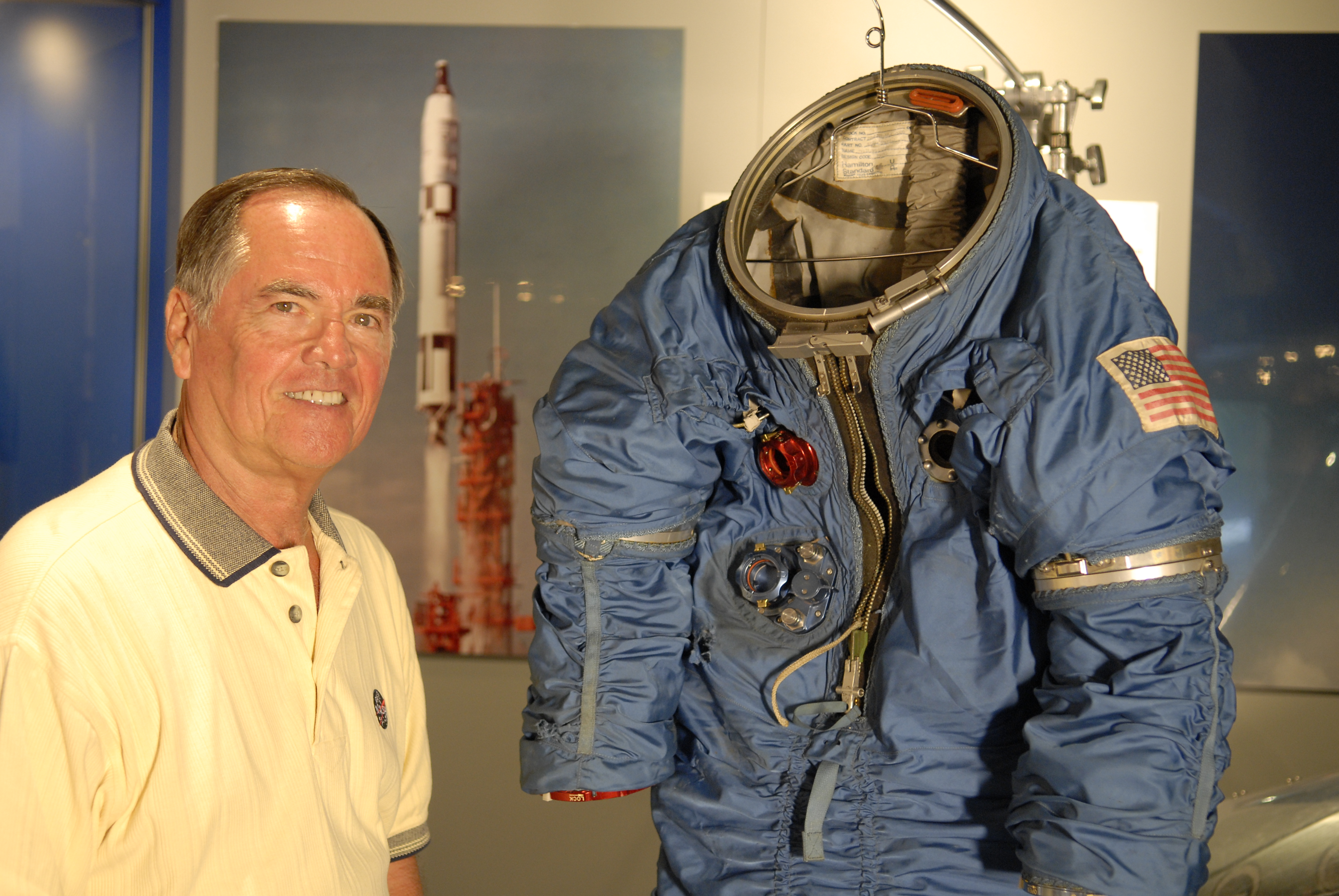
Robert Crippen examines Dick Lawyer's MOL spacesuit

In June 2005, security officers examining a long-unused room at the Cape Canaveral Air Force Station Launch Complex 5/6 museum discovered two spacesuits. The suits were not the usual NASA white but were instead a pale blue color used by the short-lived U.S. Air Force space program. The first suit was labeled 007, and the second had both a label, 008, and a name, "Lawyer". Investigators determined the second spacesuit was one used by Lawyer who had been assigned to evaluate spacesuits for the MOL program. The story of the recovered spacesuits and the history of the MOL program was presented in the Public Television series NOVA episode called Astrospies which aired February 12, 2008. One spacesuit was sent to the Smithsonian Institution's National Air and Space Museum and the other to Florida for exhibition at the U.S. Astronaut Hall of Fame.

== Later years ==
After retiring from the Air Force, Lawyer worked as a commercial test pilot for a number of firms at the Mojave Airport & Spaceport including the National Test Pilot School. He remained an active pilot up to the time of his death on November 12, 2005. Lawyer had just returned from a hunting trip when he died unexpectedly in his Palmdale, California home of a suspected blood clot. He was buried with full military honors at Arlington National Cemetery on January 5, 2006. Lawyer is survived by his wife, Gayle, five children, and nine grandchildren.
