= General Evans =

General Evans may refer to:

- Clement A. Evans (1833–1911), Confederate States Army brigadier general
- Frank Evans (general) (1876–1941), U.S. Marine Corps brigadier general
- Frederic Dahl Evans (1866–1953), U.S. Army brigadier general
- Geoffrey Charles Evans (1901–1987), British Army lieutenant general
- Harry L. Evans (1919–2008), U.S. Air Force major general
- Horace Moule Evans (1841–1923), British Indian Army general
- Jason T. Evans (fl. 1980s–2020s), U.S. Army lieutenant general
- Lewis Pugh Evans (1881–1962), British Army brigadier general
- Mark Evans (general) (born 1953), Australian Army lieutenant general
- Nathan George Evans (1824–1868), Confederate States Army brigadier general
- Robert K. Evans (1852–1926), U.S. Army brigadier general
- Roger Evans (British Army officer) (1886–1968), British Army major general
- Thomas Evans (British Army officer) (1776–1863), British Army lieutenant general
- Tim Evans (British Army officer) (born 1962), British Army lieutenant general
- Vernon Evans (general) (1893–1987), U.S. Army major general
- William Evans (British Army officer) (fl. 1710s–1740s), British Army lieutenant general
- William Andrew Evans (born 1939), British Army major general
- William J. Evans (general) (1924–2000), U.S. Air Force general

== See also ==
- Attorney General Evans (disambiguation)
