= Albert H. Crews =

American astronaut and test pilot (1929–2025)

Albert H. Crews Jr.
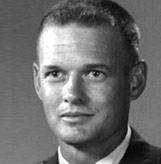
- Born: March 23, 1929; El Dorado, Arkansas, U.S.
- Died: June 7, 2025 (aged 96)
- Other name: Albert Hanlin Crews Jr.
- Education: University of Louisiana at Lafayette, B.S. 1950; Air Force Institute of Technology, M.S. 1959
- Occupations: Engineer, test pilot
- Space career

USAF astronaut
- Rank: Colonel, USAF
- Selection: 1962 Dyna-Soar Group 2; 1965 USAF MOL Group 1
- Missions: None

Albert Hanlin Crews Jr. (March 23, 1929 – June 7, 2025) was an American chemical and aeronautical engineer and a U.S. Air Force astronaut.

== Early life and education ==
Crews was born in El Dorado, Arkansas on March 23, 1929. He graduated in 1950 from the University of Louisiana at Lafayette (then named Southwestern Louisiana Institute) with a Bachelor of Science degree in chemical engineering. He earned a Master of Science degree in aeronautical engineering from the U.S. Air Force Institute of Technology in 1959.

== Test pilot ==
"We didn't really have a pecking order, but Al was our senior guy. He was our leader and the one we all looked up to."

— Lachlan Macleay, describing his MOL colleague.

As a USAF Test Pilot School graduate, he was selected as a military astronaut designee in the second group of X-20 Dyna-Soar astronauts on April 20, 1962, and assigned as a Dyna-Soar pilot on September 20, 1962. The Dyna-Soar program was cancelled in 1963. On November 12, 1965, he was selected as an astronaut in the first group for the Manned Orbiting Laboratory (MOL) program. He transferred to NASA Flight Crew Directorate at the Johnson Space Center, Houston, Texas, in June 1969 when the MOL program was cancelled. He remained a pilot for NASA, flying such aircraft as the "Super Guppy" outsize cargo transport, the WB-57F atmospheric research aircraft and the OV-095 SAIL Space Shuttle simulator until he retired at age 65.

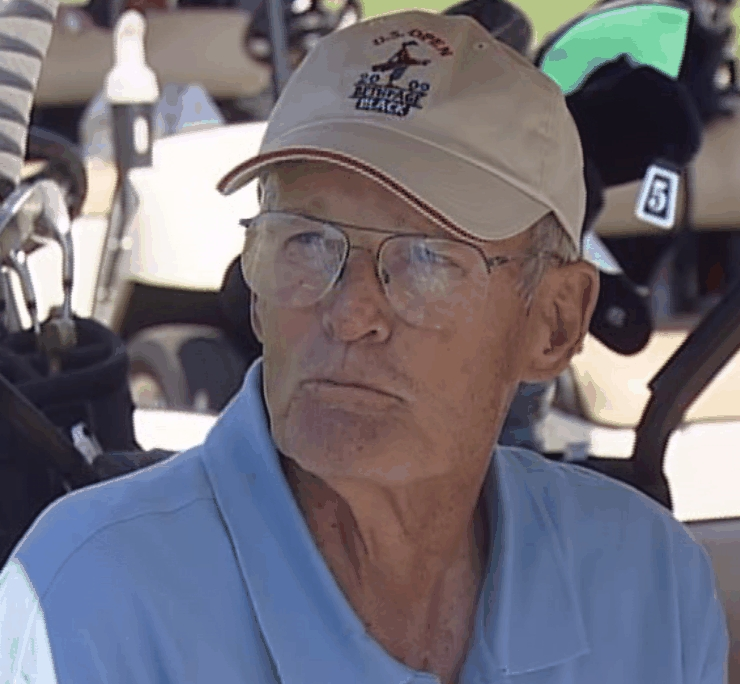
Al Crews, 2009 in San Diego

== Personal life and death ==
Crews was married, with three children from his previous marriage. He died on June 7, 2025, at the age of 96.
