= Manned Orbiting Laboratory =

Canceled U.S. Air Force human spaceflight program

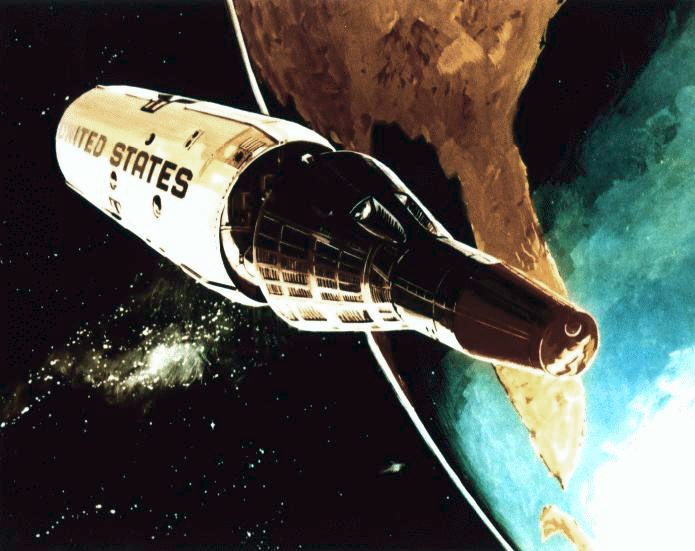
- A 1967 conceptual drawing of the Gemini B reentry capsule separating from the MOL at the end of a mission.

Station statistics
- Crew: 2
- Carrier rocket: Titan IIIM
- Mission status: Canceled
- Mass: 14,476 kg (31,914 lb)
- Length: 21.92 m (71.9 ft)
- Diameter: 3.05 m (10.0 ft)
- Pressurized volume: 11.3 m^{3} (400 cu ft)
- Orbital inclination: Polar orbit
- Configuration
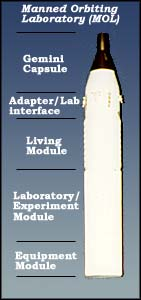
- Configuration of the Manned Orbiting Laboratory

The Manned Orbiting Laboratory (MOL) was part of the United States Air Force (USAF) human spaceflight program in the 1960s. The project was developed from early USAF concepts of crewed space stations as reconnaissance satellites, and was a successor to the canceled Boeing X-20 Dyna-Soar military reconnaissance space plane. Plans for the MOL evolved into a single-use laboratory, for which crews would be launched on 30-day missions, and return to Earth using a Gemini B spacecraft derived from NASA's Gemini spacecraft and launched with the laboratory.

The MOL program was announced to the public on 10 December 1963 as an inhabited platform to demonstrate the utility of putting people in space for military missions; its reconnaissance satellite mission was a secret black project. Seventeen astronauts were selected for the program, including Major Robert H. Lawrence Jr., the first African-American astronaut candidate. The prime contractor for the spacecraft was McDonnell Aircraft Corporation; the laboratory was built by the Douglas Aircraft Company. The Gemini B was externally similar to NASA's Gemini spacecraft, although it underwent several modifications, including the addition of a circular hatch through the heat shield, which allowed passage between the spacecraft and the laboratory. Vandenberg Space Launch Complex 6 (SLC-6) was developed to permit launches into polar orbit.

As the 1960s progressed, the Vietnam War competed with the MOL for funds, and resultant budget cuts repeatedly postponed its first operational flight. At the same time, automated systems rapidly improved, narrowing the benefits of a crewed space platform over an automated one. A single uncrewed test flight of the Gemini B spacecraft was conducted on 3 November 1966, but the MOL was canceled in June 1969 without any crewed missions being flown.

Seven of the astronauts transferred to NASA in August 1969 as NASA Astronaut Group 7, all of whom eventually flew in space on the Space Shuttle between 1981 and 1985. The Titan IIIM rocket developed for the MOL never flew, but its UA1207 solid rocket boosters were used on the Titan IV, and the Space Shuttle Solid Rocket Booster was based on materials, processes and designs developed for them. NASA spacesuits were derived from the MOL ones, MOL's waste management system flew in space on Skylab, and NASA Earth Science used other MOL equipment. SLC-6 was refurbished, but plans to have military Space Shuttle launches from there were abandoned in the wake of the January 1986 Space Shuttle Challenger disaster.

== Background ==
At the height of the Cold War in the mid-1950s, the United States Air Force (USAF) was particularly interested in the Soviet Union's military and industrial capabilities. Starting in 1956, the United States conducted covert U-2 spy plane overflights of the Soviet Union. Twenty-four U-2 missions produced images of about 15 percent of the country with a maximum resolution of 0.61 meters (2 ft) before the downing of a U-2 in 1960 abruptly ended the program. This left a gap in American espionage capabilities that it was hoped spy satellites would fill. In July 1957 – before anyone had flown in space – the USAF Wright Air Development Center published a paper that considered the development of a space station equipped with telescopes and other observation devices. The USAF had already started a satellite program in 1956 called WS-117L. This had three components: SAMOS, a spy satellite; Corona, an experimental program to develop the technology; and MIDAS, an early warning system.

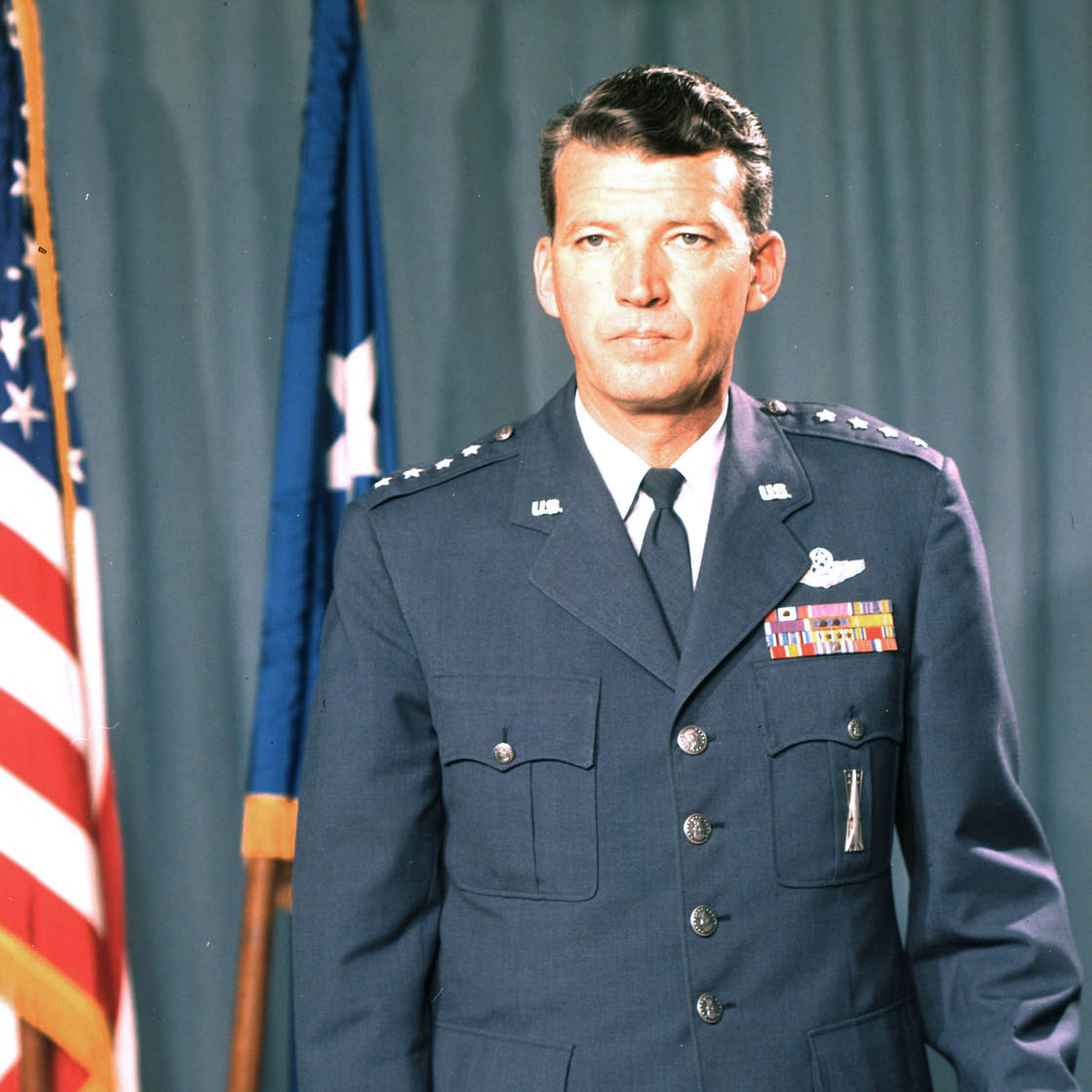
General Bernard Adolph Schriever, the director of the MOL program from 1962 to 1966

The launch of Sputnik 1, the first satellite, by the Soviet Union on 4 October 1957, came as a profound shock to the American public, which had assumed American technical superiority. One benefit of the Sputnik crisis was that no government protested Sputnik's overflying their territory, thereby tacitly acknowledging the legality of satellites. While there was a big difference between Sputnik and a spy satellite, it made it much harder for the Soviets to object to overflights by satellites from another country. In February 1958, President Dwight D. Eisenhower ordered the USAF to proceed as quickly as possible with Corona as a joint interim project with the Central Intelligence Agency (CIA).

In August 1958, Eisenhower decided to give responsibility for most forms of human space flight to the National Aeronautics and Space Administration (NASA). Deputy Secretary of Defense Donald A. Quarles transferred US$53.8 million (equivalent to $447 million in 2024) that had been set aside for USAF space projects to NASA. This left the USAF with a few programs with direct military impact. One was a delta-wing, rocket-propelled glider that came to be called the Boeing X-20 Dyna-Soar. The USAF remained interested in space, and in March 1959, the Chief of Staff of the Air Force, General Thomas D. White asked the USAF Director of Development Planning to prepare a long-range plan for a USAF space program. One project identified in the plan was a "manned orbital laboratory".

The USAF Air Research and Development Command (ARDC) issued a request to the Aeronautical Systems Division (ASD) at Wright-Patterson Air Force Base on 1 September 1959 for a formal study to be conducted of a military test space station (MTSS). The ASD asked components of the ARDC for suggestions as to what sort of experiments would be suitable for an MTSS, and 125 proposals were received. A request for proposal (RFP) was then issued on 19 February 1960, and twelve firms responded. On 15 August 1960, General Electric, Lockheed Aircraft, Glenn L. Martin Company, McDonnell Aircraft Corporation, and General Dynamics shared US$574,999 (equivalent to $4.61 million in 2024) for a study of the MTSS. Their preliminary reports were submitted in January 1961, and final reports were received by July 1961. With these in hand, on 16 August 1961, the USAF submitted a request for US$5 million (equivalent to $40 million in 2024) in funding for space station studies in fiscal year 1963, but no funding was forthcoming.

In its 26 April 1961 project plan, Dyna-Soar was to be launched into space on a suborbital ballistic trajectory by a Titan I booster, its first piloted suborbital flight in April 1965, followed by its first piloted orbital flight in April 1966. In a 22 February 1962 memorandum to the Secretary of the Air Force, Eugene Zuckert, the Secretary of Defense, Robert McNamara, decided to fast track Dyna-Soar and save money by skipping the suborbital testing phase; the Dyna-Soar was now planned to be launched by a Titan III booster.

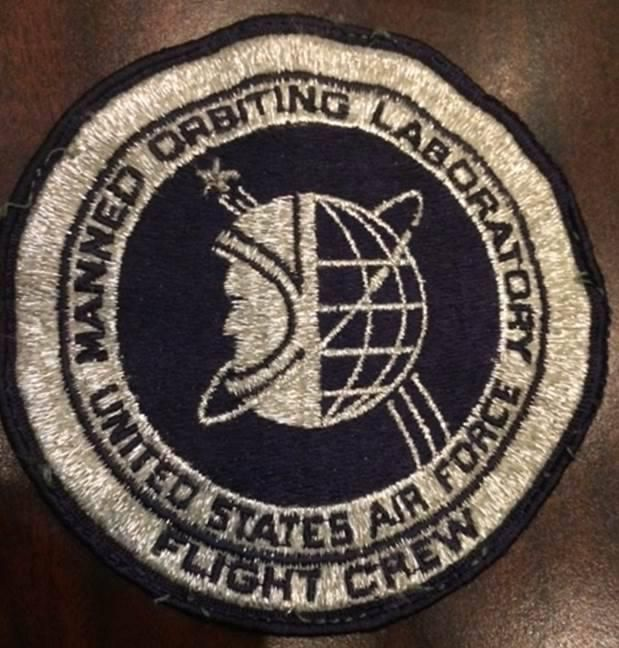
MOL patch

The same 22 February 1962 memorandum gave tacit approval for the development of a space station. The USAF staff and the Air Force Systems Command (AFSC) began planning for a space station, which was now known as a Military Orbital Development System (MODS). By the end of May 1962, a proposed system package plan (PSPP) had been drawn up. For tracking purposes, it was designated Program 287. MODS consisted of a space station, a modified NASA Gemini spacecraft that became known as Blue Gemini, and a Titan III launch vehicle. The space station was expected to provide a shirt-sleeve environment for a crew of four for up to 30 days. On 25 August 1962, Zuckert informed General Bernard Adolph Schriever, the commander of the AFSC, that he was to proceed with studies of the Manned Orbiting Laboratory (MOL) as the director of the program. The name was chosen because NASA did not want the Department of Defense (DoD) to use the term "space station".

On 9 November 1962, Zuckert submitted his proposals to McNamara. For fiscal year 1964, he requested US$75 million (equivalent to $594 million in 2024) in funding for MODS and US$102 million (equivalent to $817 million in 2024) for Blue Gemini. Since Project Gemini was now associated with national security, McNamara considered taking over the entire project from NASA, but after some negotiation with NASA, McNamara and NASA Administrator James E. Webb reached an agreement on collaboration on the project in January 1963.

McNamara called for a review of whether Dyna-Soar had military capabilities that could not be met by Gemini, on 18 January 1963. In his 14 November 1963 response, the Director of Defense Research and Engineering (DDR&E), Harold Brown, examined options for a space station. He preferred a four-man station that would be launched separately and crewed by astronauts arriving in Gemini spacecraft. Crews would rotate every 30 days, with resupply of consumables arriving every 120 days. On 10 December 1963, McNamara issued a press release that officially announced the cancellation of Dyna-Soar and the initiation of the MOL program.

Soon after coming to office, the Kennedy administration tightened security regarding spy satellites in response to Soviet sensitivities. No administration official would even admit they existed until President Jimmy Carter did so in 1978. MOL was therefore a semi-secret project, with a public face but a covert reconnaissance mission, similar to that of the secret Corona spy satellite program.

== Initiation ==
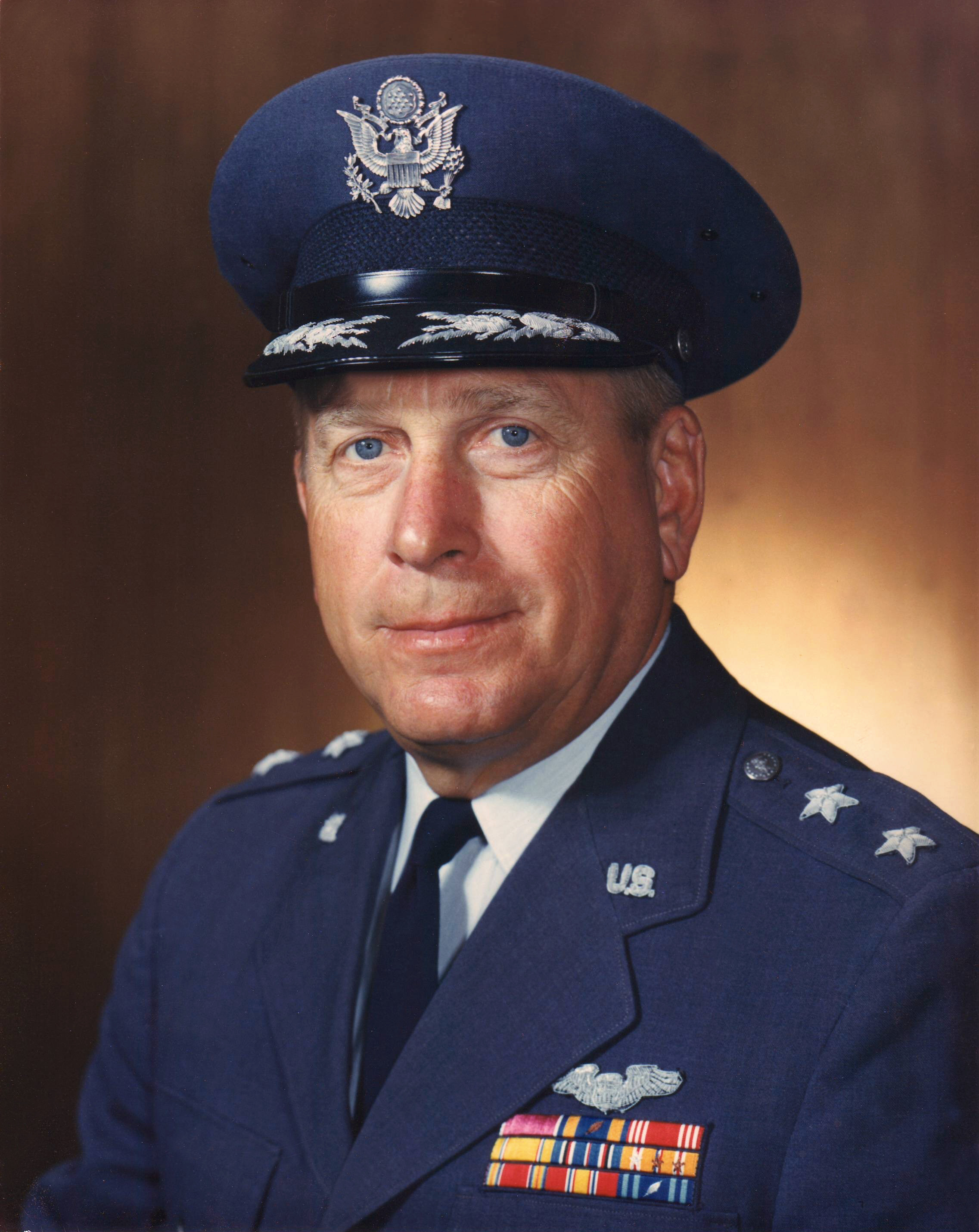
Major General Joseph S. Bleymaier, head of the MOL System Program Office (SPO)

On 16 December 1963, USAF Headquarters ordered Schriever to submit a development plan for the MOL. About US$6 million (equivalent to $46 million in 2024) was spent on preliminary studies, most of which were completed by September 1964. McDonnell prepared a study of the Gemini B spacecraft, Martin Marietta of the Titan III booster, and Eastman Kodak of camera optics, the basic equipment of a satellite reconnaissance equipment. Other studies examined key MOL subsystems such as environmental control, electrical power, navigation, attitude control stabilization, guidance, communications and radar.

The United States Under Secretary of the Air Force and the Director of the National Reconnaissance Office (NRO), Brockway McMillan, asked the director of NRO Program A (the component of NRO responsible for the Air Force aspects of NRO activities), Major General Robert Evans Greer, to look into the MOL's potential reconnaissance capabilities. These studies cost US$3,237,716 (equivalent to $25 million in 2024). The most expensive was of the Gemini B spacecraft, which cost US$1,189,500 (equivalent to $9.17 million in 2024), followed by the Titan III interface, which cost US$910,000 (equivalent to $7.01 million in 2024).

The USAF issued an RFP to twenty firms in January 1965. At the end of February 1965, Boeing, Douglas, General Electric and Lockheed were selected to carry out design studies. Covert NRO activities to be carried out by MOL were classified secret and given the code name "Dorian". In February 1969, the MOL was given a Keyhole (reconnaissance satellite) designation as KH-10 Dorian.

As a black project (i.e. one that was secret and publicly unacknowledged), but one impossible to completely conceal, MOL needed some "white" (i.e. unclassified and publicly acknowledged) experiments as cover. An MOL Experiments Working Group was created under Colonel William Brady. Some 400 experiments proposed by several agencies were examined. These were consolidated and reduced to 59, and twelve primary and eighteen secondary ones were selected. A 499-page report on the experiments was issued on 1 April 1964. Although reconnaissance was its main purpose, "manned orbiting laboratory" was still an accurate description; the program hoped to prove that astronauts could perform militarily useful tasks in a shirt-sleeve environment in space for up to thirty days.

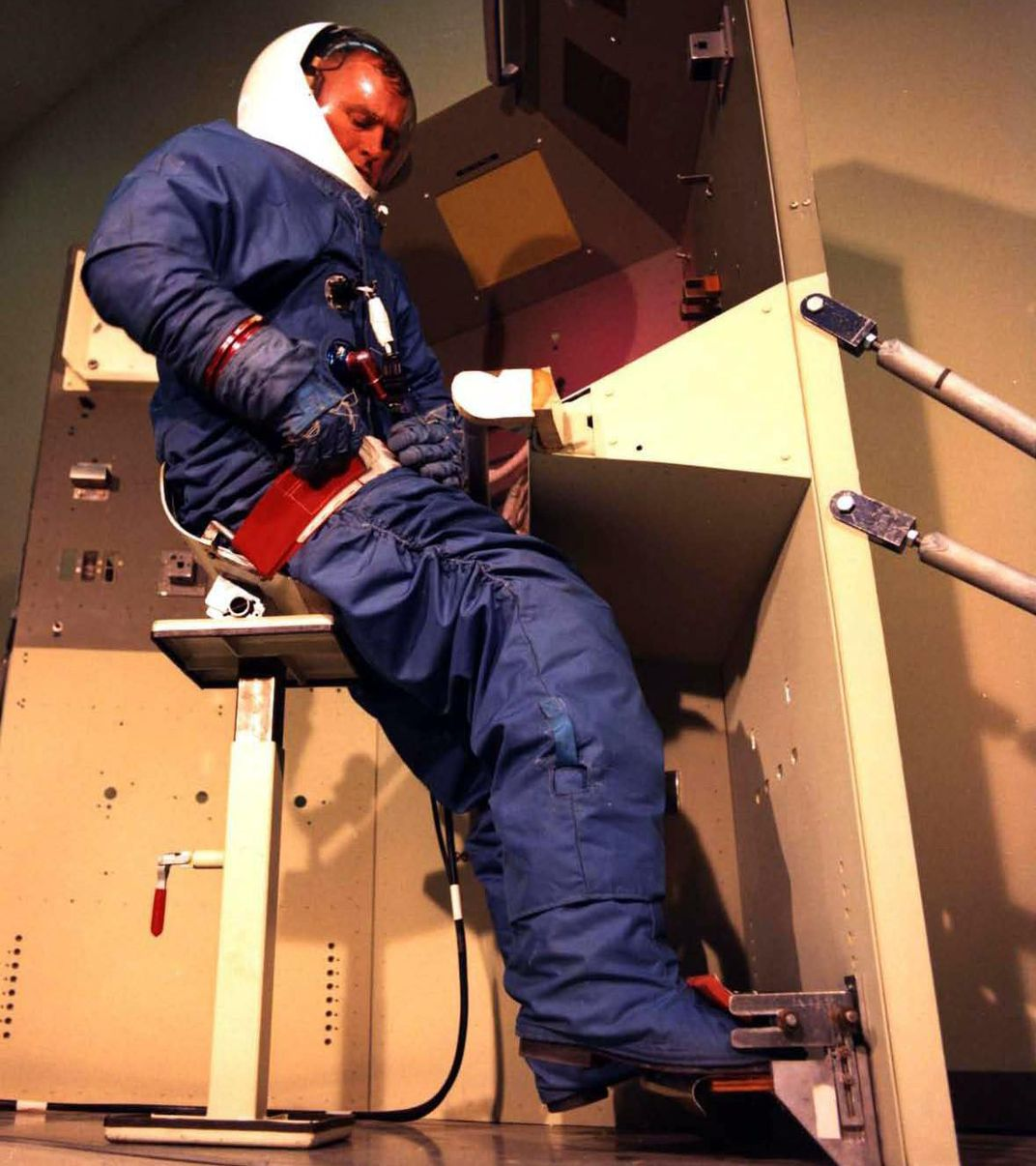
Foot restraints were used to prevent the astronaut from floating away from the workstations. This technique was later adopted for the International Space Station (ISS).

The USAF recommended that the MOL use the Gemini B spacecraft with the Titan III booster. A program of six flights (one uncrewed and five crewed) was proposed, the first flight taking place in 1966. The program was costed at US$1.653 billion (equivalent to $13 billion in 2024). The Science Advisor to the President, Donald Hornig, reviewed the USAF's submission. He noted that for the sophisticated reconnaissance missions proposed, a human-operated system was far superior to an automated one, but speculated that with sufficient effort, the gap between the two could be reduced. He also noted that while countries had not objected to satellites passing overhead, a crewed space station might be a different matter, but the Secretary of State, Dean Rusk, thought that this could be managed.

There remained the question of whether the improved performance compared to the automated KH-8 Gambit 3 satellite then under development justified the cost. The Director of Central Intelligence, Admiral William Raborn agreed that it might. McNamara took the proposal to President Lyndon Johnson on 24 August 1965, who approved it, and issued an official announcement at a press conference the following day.

In January 1965, Schriever had appointed Brigadier General Harry L. Evans as his deputy for MOL. Evans had previously worked with Schriever in the USAF Ballistic Systems Division. He had also been the Corona program manager, and had supervised SAMOS, MIDAS and SAINT, together with the early communications and weather satellite programs. As well as being Schriever's deputy, Evans became Zuckert's Special Assistant for MOL on 18 January 1965. In this role, he reported directly to Zuckert, and was responsible for liaising between MOL and other agencies such as NASA.

In the wake of Johnson's announcement of the program, MOL was given the designation Program 632A. The USAF announced the appointment of Schriever as MOL director and Evans as vice director, in charge of the MOL staff at the Pentagon, with Brigadier General Russell A. Berg as deputy director, in charge of the MOL staff at the Los Angeles Air Force Station in El Segundo, California. The MOL System Program Office (SPO) was created in March 1964 under Brigadier General Joseph S. Bleymaier, the Deputy Commander of the AFSC Space Systems Division (SSD). By August 1965, the MOL had a staff of 42 military and 23 civilian personnel. Schriever retired from the Air Force in August 1966, and was succeeded as head of the AFSC and MOL Program Director by Major General James Ferguson. Evans retired from the Air Force on 27 March 1968, and was replaced by Major General James T. Stewart.

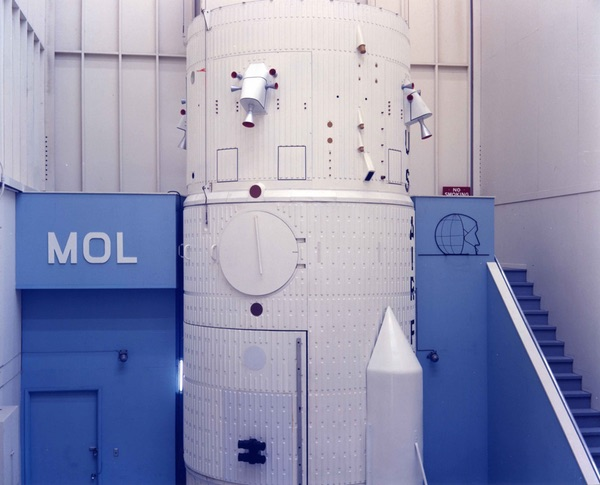
MOL mockups like this were used to refine the design.

Schriever and the Director of the NRO, Alexander H. Flax, signed a formal agreement covering MOL Black Financial Procedures on 4 November 1965. Under this agreement, the Deputy Director MOL would forward black budget cost estimates to the NRO Controller, who had the authority to obligate NRO funds. This was followed by a corresponding MOL White Financial Procedures Agreement, which was approved by Flax in December 1965 and signed by Leonard Marks Jr., the Assistant Secretary of the Air Force (Financial Management & Comptroller). This provided for a more regular channel, with funds going through the AFSC to its Space Systems Division (SSD) and thence to the MOL SPO. Thus far no definition contracts had been let, except for the Titan III expendable launch vehicle. On 30 September 1965, Brown released US$12 million (equivalent to $92 million in 2024) in fiscal year 1965 funds and US$50 million (equivalent to $385 million in 2024) in fiscal year 1966 funds for the MOL definition phase activities.

Johnson had announced two MOL contractors: Douglas and General Electric. While the former had considerable technical and managerial experience from the Thor, Genie and Nike projects, General Electric had experience with large optical systems, and, perhaps more importantly, had over a thousand personnel immediately cleared for Dorian, while Douglas had very few. A US$10.55 million (equivalent to $78 million in 2024) fixed-price contract was signed with Douglas on 17 October 1965. Contract negotiations with General Electric were also completed around this time, and the company was given US$4.922 million (equivalent to $36 million in 2024), all but US$0.975 million (equivalent to $7 million in 2024) of it in black budget funds.

The Aerospace Corporation was given responsibility for general systems engineering and technical direction. Douglas selected five major subcontractors: Hamilton-Standard for environmental control and life support; Collins Radio for communications; Honeywell for attitude control; Pratt & Whitney for electrical power; and IBM for data management. Aerospace and the MOL SPO concurred with all but the last, noting that while IBM had a technically superior bid to UNIVAC, its estimated cost was US$32 million (equivalent to $236 million in 2024) compared to UNIVAC's US$16.8 million (equivalent to $124 million in 2024). Douglas decided to let study contracts to both firms.

== Astronauts ==
=== Selection ===
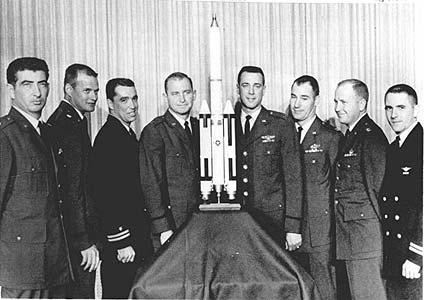
First MOL astronaut group. Left to right: Michael J. Adams, Albert H. Crews, John L. Finley, Richard E. Lawyer, Lachlan Macleay, Francis G. Neubeck, James M. Taylor, and Richard H. Truly.

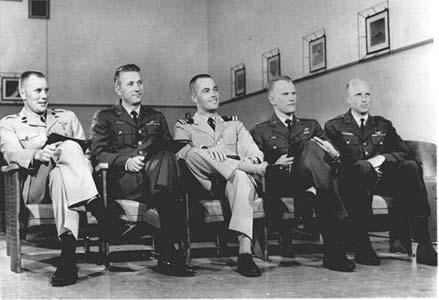
Second MOL astronaut group. Left to right: Robert F. (Bob) Overmyer, Henry W. (Hank) Hartsfield, Robert L. Crippen, Karol J. Bobko and C. Gordon Fullerton.

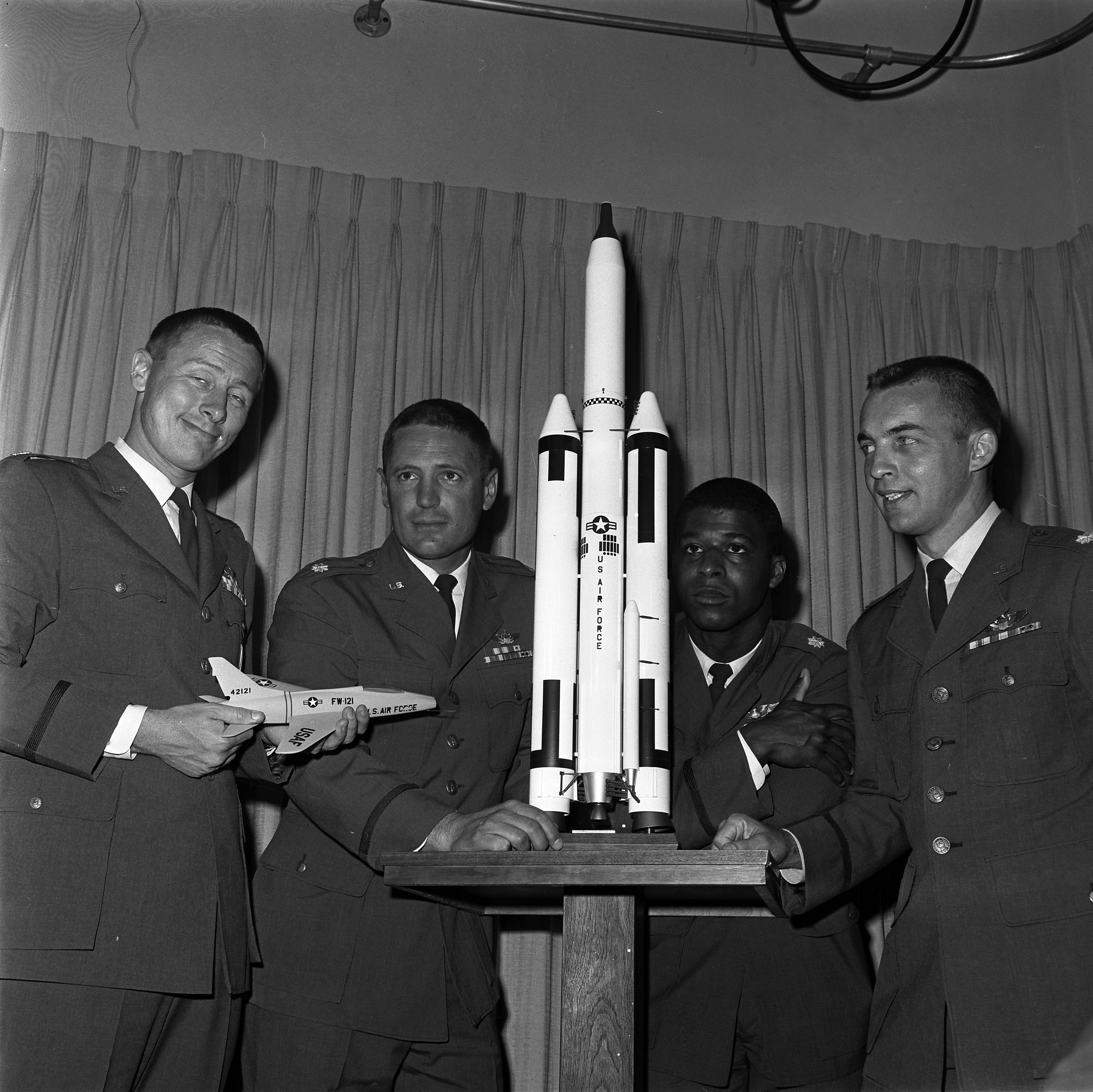
Third MOL astronaut group. Left to right: James A. Abrahamson, Robert T. Herres, Robert H. Lawrence, Jr., and Donald H. Peterson.

To provide prospective astronauts for the X-15 rocket-powered aircraft, Dyna-Soar and MOL programs, on 5 June 1961 the USAF created the Aerospace Research Pilot Course at the USAF Experimental Flight Test Pilot School at Edwards Air Force Base in California. The school was renamed the Aerospace Research Pilot School (ARPS) on 12 October 1961. Four classes were conducted between June 1961 and May 1963, the third receiving instruction on Dyna-Soar as part of the course. The commandant of the ARPS, Colonel Charles E. "Chuck" Yeager, advised Schriever to restrict the selection of astronauts for the MOL to ARPS graduates. The program did not accept applications; 15 candidates were selected and sent to Brooks Air Force Base in San Antonio, Texas, for a week of medical evaluation in October 1964. The evaluations were similar to those conducted for NASA astronaut groups.

For the first three NASA astronaut groups in 1959, 1962 and 1963, the USAF had established a selection board to review candidates before forwarding their names to NASA. The Chief of Staff of the USAF, General John P. McConnell, informed Schriever that he expected the selection of MOL astronauts to follow the same procedure. A selection board was convened in September 1965, chaired by Major General Jerry D. Page. On 15 September 1965, the selection criteria for MOL was announced. Candidates had to be:

- Qualified military pilots;
- Graduates of the ARPS;
- Serving officers, recommended by their commanding officers; and
- Holding U.S. citizenship from birth.

In October 1965, the MOL Policy Committee decided that MOL crew members would be designated "MOL Aerospace Research Pilots" rather than astronauts.

The names of the first group of eight MOL pilots were announced on 12 November 1965 as a Friday night news dump to avoid press attention.

- Major Michael J. Adams, USAF
- Major Albert H. Crews Jr., USAF
- Lieutenant John L. Finley, USN
- Captain Richard E. Lawyer, USAF
- Captain Lachlan Macleay, USAF
- Captain Francis G. Neubeck, USAF
- Major James M. Taylor, USAF
- Lieutenant Richard H. Truly, USN.

To prevent their return to the Navy on graduation, Finley and Truly were retained as instructors until the announcement.

In late 1965, the USAF began selecting a second group of MOL pilots. This time applications were accepted. Selection occurred at the same time as that for NASA Astronaut Group 5, many applying to both programs. Successful candidates were told that NASA or MOL had chosen them, with no explanation why they had been chosen by one and not the other. Over 500 applications were received and 100 were forwarded to USAF Headquarters. The MOL Program Office selected 25, who were sent to Brooks Air Force Base for physical evaluation in January and February 1966. Five were selected, and their names were publicly announced on 17 June 1966:

- Captain Karol J. Bobko, USAF
- Lieutenant Robert L. Crippen, USN
- Captain C. Gordon Fullerton, USAF
- Captain Henry W. Hartsfield Jr., USAF
- Captain Robert F. Overmyer, USMC.

Bobko was the first graduate of the United States Air Force Academy to be selected as an astronaut.

Eight other finalists for the second class had not yet completed ARPS. One was already attending; the other seven were sent to Edwards Air Force Base to join Class 66-B. The MOL Astronaut Selection Board met again on 11 May 1967, and recommended that four of the eight be appointed. The MOL Program Office announced names of those selected for the third group of MOL astronauts on 30 June 1967:

- Major James A. Abrahamson, USAF
- Lieutenant Colonel Robert T. Herres, USAF
- Major Robert H. Lawrence Jr., USAF
- Major Donald H. Peterson, USAF.

Lawrence was the first African-American to be chosen as an astronaut.

=== Training ===
Many MOL astronauts had hoped since childhood to travel into space. They only knew of the cover story that the program would be a space laboratory for military experiments, and did not learn of the reconnaissance role until after selection; they were advised to resign if they disliked the classified aspect. They received security clearances and were introduced to Sensitive Compartmented Information such as Dorian, Gambit, Talent (intelligence obtained from spy plane overflights) and Keyhole (intelligence obtained from satellites). Truly was amazed to learn that his country had not one but "two space programs: the public, what the public knew and [NASA] astronauts and all that jazz, and then this other world of capability that didn't exist".

Phase I of crew training was a two-month introduction to the MOL program in the form of a series of briefings from NASA and the contractors. Phase II lasted for five months, and was conducted at the ARPS, where the astronauts were given technical training on the MOL vehicles and their operation procedures. This training was conducted in classrooms, training flights, and sessions on the T-27 space flight simulator. Phase III was continuous training on the MOL systems and providing crew input to them. The pilots spent most of their time in this phase. Phase IV was training for specific missions.

Simulators were developed for each of the different MOL systems: Laboratory Module Simulator, Mission Payload Simulator, and Gemini B Procedures Simulator. Zero-G training was conducted in a Boeing C-135 Stratolifter reduced-gravity aircraft. A Flotation-Egress trainer allowed the astronauts to prepare for a splashdown and the possibility of the spacecraft sinking. NASA had pioneered neutral buoyancy simulation as a training aid. The pilots were given scuba diving training at the U.S. Navy Underwater Swimmers School in Key West, Florida. Training was then conducted on a General Electric simulator on Buck Island, near Saint Thomas, U.S. Virgin Islands. Water survival training was conducted at the USAF Sea Survival School at Homestead Air Force Base in Florida, and jungle survival training at the Tropical Survival School at Howard Air Force Base in the Panama Canal Zone. In July 1967, the pilots underwent training at the National Photographic Interpretation Center (NPIC) in Washington, D.C.

== Planned operations ==
=== Reconnaissance ===
From the MOL's regular 280-kilometer (150 nmi) orbit, the main camera had a circular field of view 2,700 meters (9,000 ft) across, although at top magnification it was more like 1,300 meters (4,200 ft). This was much smaller than many of the targets that the NRO was interested in, such as air bases, shipyards and missile ranges. The astronauts would search for targets using the tracking and acquisition telescopes, which had a circular view about 12.0 km (6.5 nmi) across, with a resolution of about 9.1 meters (30 ft). The main camera would focus on the most important targets, providing a very high resolution image. The aim was to have the most interesting part of the target in the center of the image; due to the optics used, the image would not be as sharp around the edges.

While surveillance targets were pre-programmed and the camera could operate automatically, astronauts could decide target priority for photographing. By avoiding cloudy areas and identifying more interesting subjects (an open missile silo instead of a closed one, for example), they would save film, the major limitation, since it had to be returned in the small Gemini B spacecraft. In cloudy areas like Moscow, it was estimated that the MOL would be 45 percent more efficient in its use of film than an automated satellite system through the ability to react to cloud cover, but for sunnier areas like the Tyuratam missile complex, this might be no more than 15 percent. The selective targeting afforded by human-guided surveillance would be more efficient than that obtained by robotic satellites. Of the 159 KH-7 Gambit photographs of the Tyuratam area, only 9 percent showed missiles on the launch pads, and of 77 photographs of missile silos, only 21 percent were with the doors open. The analysts identified 60 MOL targets in the complex. Only two or three could be photographed on each pass, but astronauts could select the most interesting ones, and photograph them with greater resolution than KH-7 Gambit.

The Air Force expected that an improved version of the MOL space station, known as Block II, expected to be available for the sixth crewed flight in July 1974, would add image transmission and geodetic system targeting. Astronauts would perform infrared, multispectral, and ultraviolet astronomy when they had time during an extended mission duration on twice-annual flights. After Block II, the MOL program managers hoped to build larger, permanent facilities. A planning document depicted 12-man and 40-man stations, both with self-defense capability. It described the 40-man, Y-shaped station as a "spaceborne command post" in synchronous orbit. With the "key requirement – post attack survivability", the station would be capable of "Strategic/tactical decision making" during a general war.

=== Flight schedule ===
Flight schedule as of 1 September 1966
Flight	Date	Details	Reference
1	15 April 1969	First Titan IIIM qualification flight (simulated Orbiting Vehicle).	
2	1 July 1969	Second uncrewed Gemini-B/Titan IIIM qualification flight (Gemini-B flown alone, without an active laboratory).	
3	15 December 1969	A crew of two, commanded by Taylor (possibly with Crews) would have spent thirty days in orbit.	
4	15 April 1970	Second crewed mission.	
5	15 July 1970	Third crewed mission.	
6	15 October 1970	Fourth crewed MOL mission, of 30 to 60 days duration. All-Navy crew composed of Truly and either Crippen or Overmyer.	
7	15 January 1971	Fifth crewed MOL mission	

== Spacecraft ==
The Gemini spacecraft originated at NASA in 1961 as a development of the Mercury spacecraft, and was originally called Mercury Mark II. The name "Gemini" was chosen in recognition of its two-man crew. The NASA Gemini spacecraft was redesigned for the MOL and named Gemini B, although the NASA Gemini spacecraft was never referred to as Gemini A. The astronauts would fly into space in the Gemini B capsule, which would be launched together with the MOL modules atop a Titan IIIM launch vehicle. Once in orbit, the crew would power down the capsule and activate and enter the laboratory module. After about one month of space station operations, the crew would return to the Gemini B capsule, power it up, separate it from the station, and perform reentry. Gemini B had an endurance of about 14 hours once detached from MOL.

Like the NASA Gemini, the Gemini B spacecraft would splash down in the Atlantic or Pacific Oceans and be recovered by the same DoD spacecraft recovery forces used by NASA's Project Gemini and Project Apollo. NASA had a paraglider under development to enable a Gemini spacecraft to paraglide to a dry-land touch-down, but was unable to get it working in time for Project Gemini missions. In March 1964, NASA attempted to get the USAF interested in using the paraglider with Gemini B, but after reviewing the troubled program, the USAF concluded that the paraglider still had too many problems to overcome, and it turned down the offer. The MOL laboratory module was intended to be used for a single mission only, with no provision for a later mission to dock and reuse it. Instead, its orbit would decay and it would be dumped in the ocean after 30 days.

Externally Gemini B was quite similar to its NASA twin, but there were many differences. The most noticeable was that it featured a rear hatch for the crew to enter the MOL space station. Notches were cut into the ejection seat headrests to allow access to the hatch. The seats were therefore mirror images of each other instead of being the same. Gemini B also had a larger diameter heat shield to handle the higher energy of reentry from a polar orbit. The number of reentry control system thrusters was increased from four to six. There was no orbit attitude and maneuvering system (OAMS), because capsule orientation for reentry was handled by the forward reentry control system thrusters, and the laboratory module had its own reaction control system for orientation.

The Gemini B systems were designed for long-term orbital storage (40 days), but equipment for long duration flights was removed since the Gemini B capsule itself was intended to be used only for launch and reentry. It had a different cockpit layout and instruments. As a result of the Apollo 1 fire in January 1967, in which three NASA astronauts were killed in a ground test of their spacecraft, the MOL was switched to use a helium-oxygen atmosphere instead of a pure oxygen one. At takeoff, the astronauts would breathe pure oxygen in their spacesuits while the cabin was pressurized with helium. It would then be brought up to a helium-oxygen mix. This was an option that had been provided for in the original design.

Four Gemini B spacecraft were ordered from McDonnell, along with a boilerplate aerodynamically similar test article, at a cost of US$168.2 million (equivalent to $1204 million in 2024). In November 1965, NASA agreed to hand over Gemini spacecraft No. 2 and Static Test Article No. 4 to the MOL program. Gemini spacecraft No. 2, which had flown in the 1965 Gemini 2 mission, was refurbished as a prototype Gemini B spacecraft.

=== Gemini B specifications ===
- Crew: 2
- Maximum duration: 40 days
- Length: 3.35 m (11.0 ft)
- Diameter: 2.32 m (7 ft 7 in)
- Cabin volume: 2.55 m^{3} (90 cu ft)
- Gross mass: 1,983 kg (4,372 lb)
- RCS thrusters: 16 N × 98 N (3.6 lb_{f} × 22.0 lb_{f})
- RCS impulse: 283 s (2.78 km/s)
- Electric system: 4 kWh (14 MJ)
- Battery: 180 A·h (648,000 C)

=== Gemini B layout ===
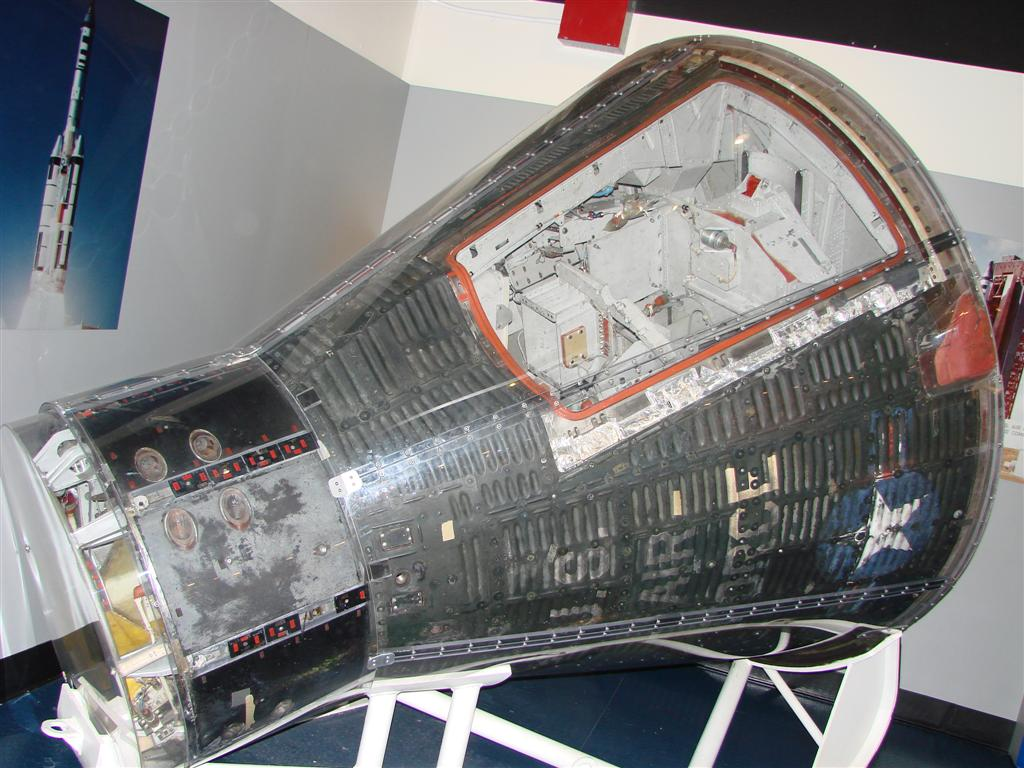
Flown Gemini B prototype

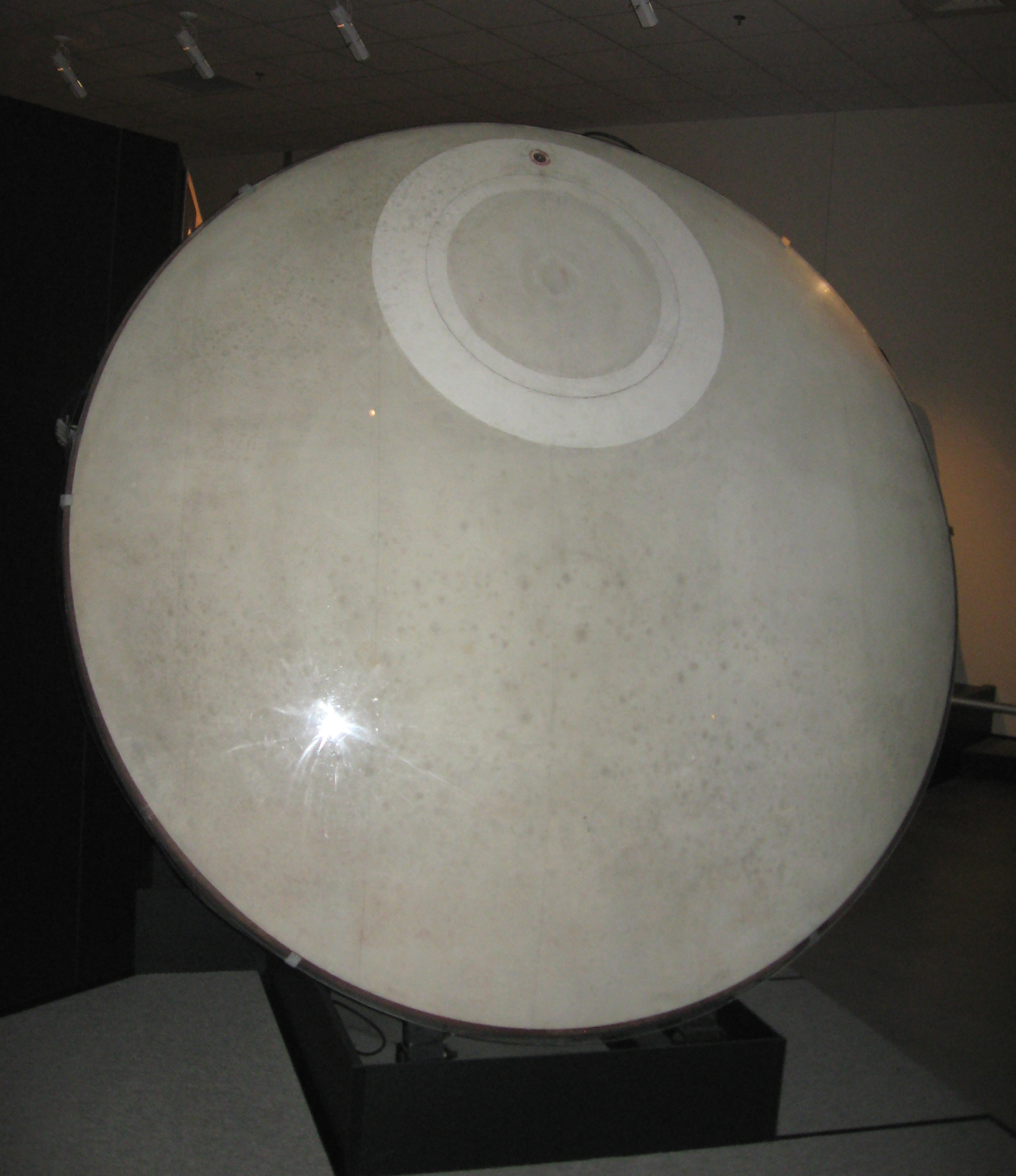
Heat shield with hatch

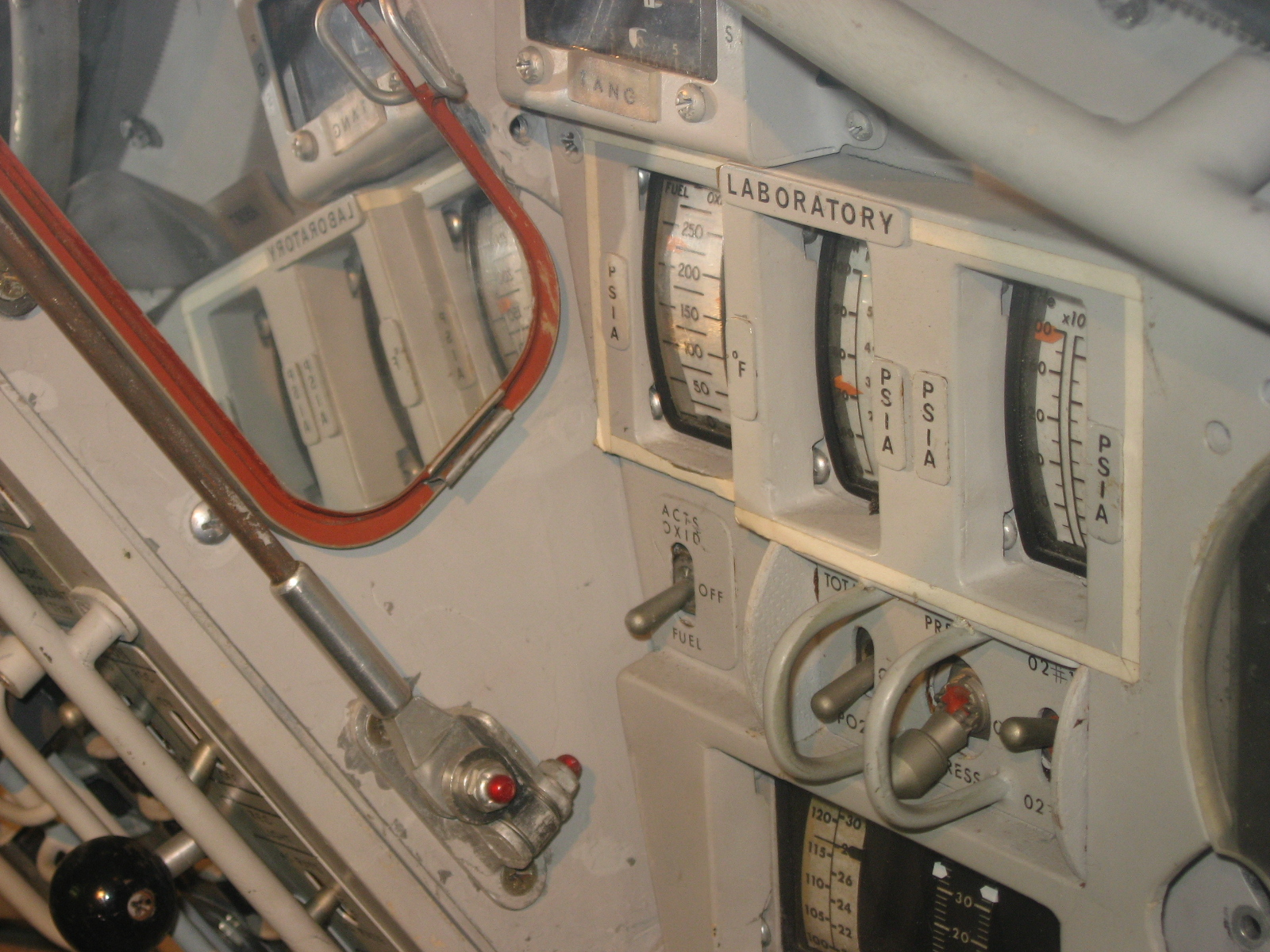
Display panel

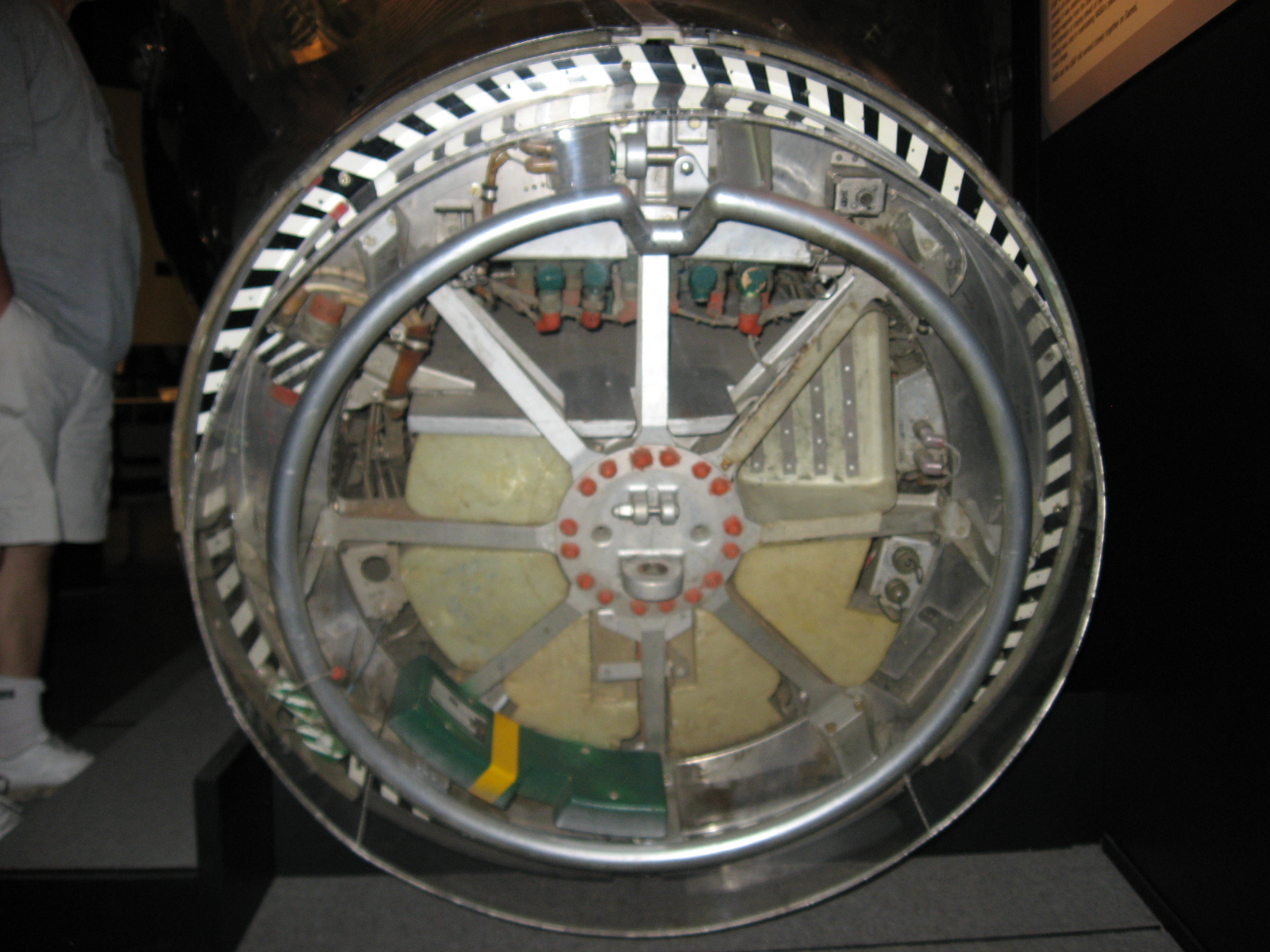
Gemini B nose

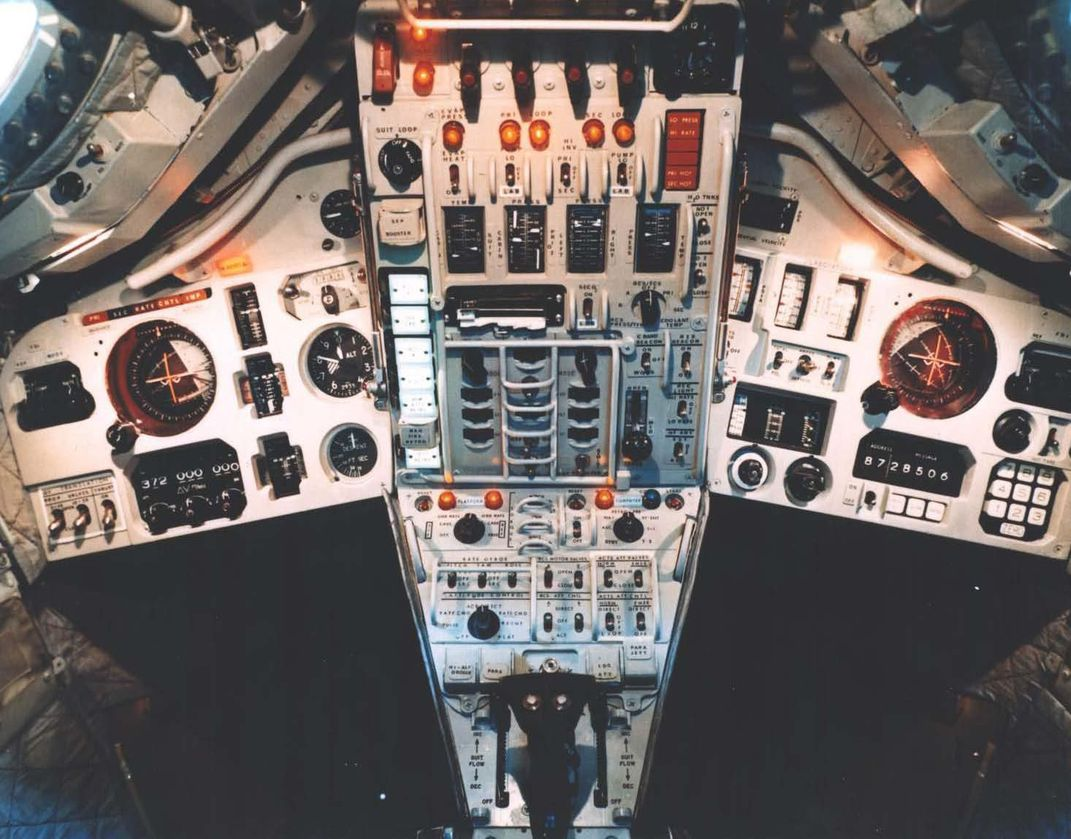
Control panel

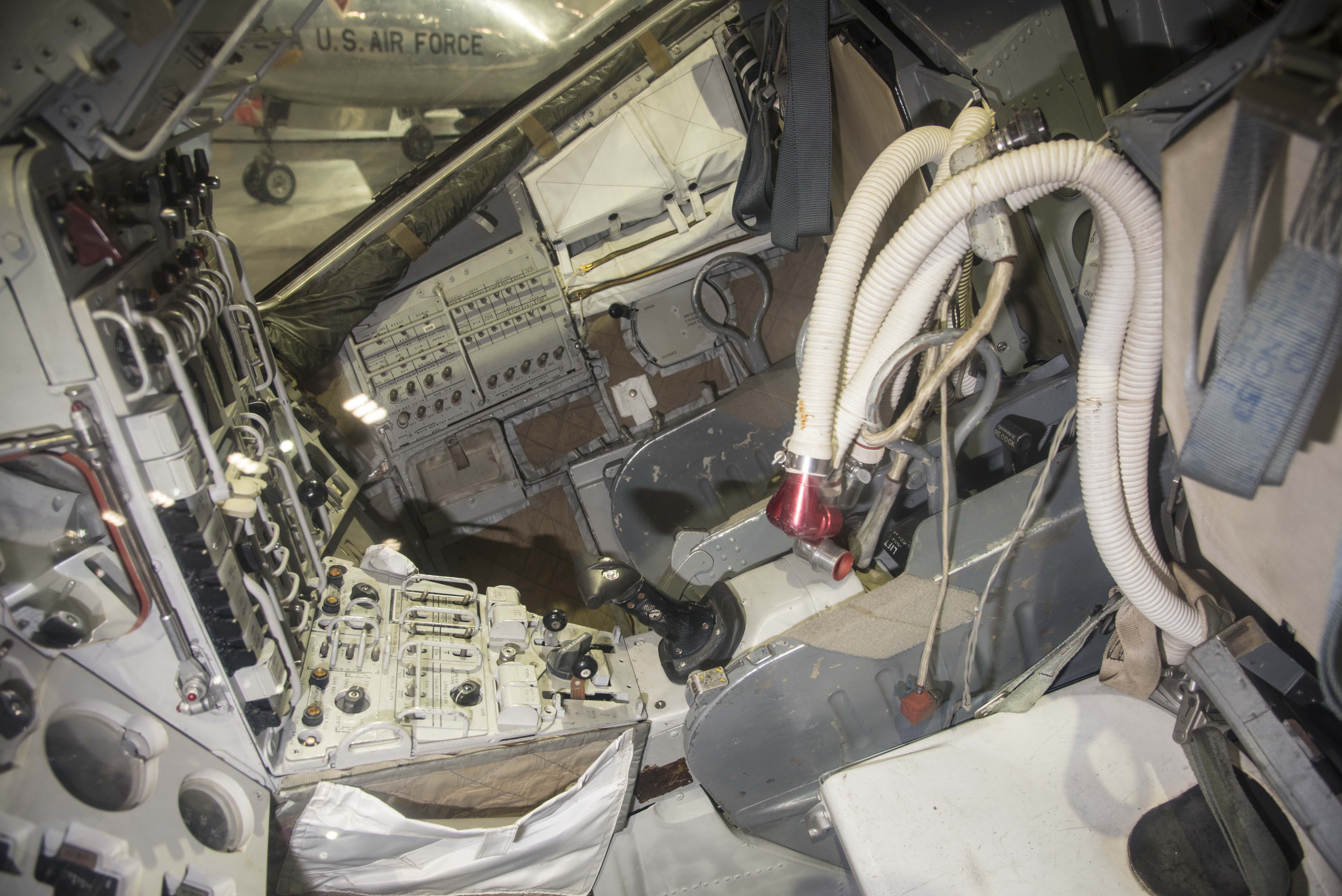
Spacecraft interior

== Space station ==
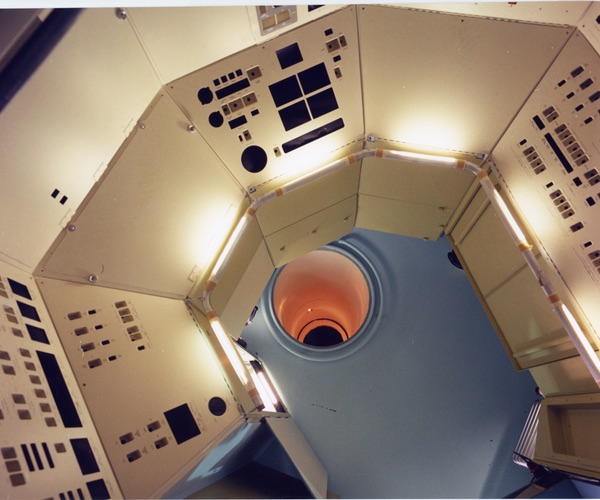
Mockup of the MOL laboratory module interior and transfer tunnel

The hatch in the Gemini B spacecraft's heat shield connected to a transfer tunnel that ran through the adaptor module. This contained the cryogenic hydrogen, helium and oxygen storage tanks, and housed the environmental control system, fuel cells, and four quad reaction control system thrusters and their propellant tanks. The transfer tunnel gave access to the laboratory module.

The purpose-built laboratory module was divided into two sections, but there was no partition between the two, and the crew could move freely between them. It was 5.8 meters (19 ft) long and 3.05 meters (10.0 ft) in diameter. Both were octagonal in shape, with eight bays. In the "upper" half (as it would have been on the launch pad), Bays 1 and 8 contained storage compartments; Bay 2, the environmental control system; Bay 3, the hygiene/waste compartment; Bay 4, the biochemical test console and work station; Bays 5 and 6, the airlock; and Bay 7, a glovebox for handling liquids; below that, a secondary food console. In the "lower" half, Bay 1 contained a motion chair that measured the mass of the crew; Bay 2, two performance test panels; Bay 3, the environmental control system controls; Bay 4, a physiology test console; Bay 5, an exercise device; Bay 6, two emergency oxygen masks; Bay 7, a view port and instrument panel; and Bay 8, the main spacecraft control station.

=== Space station specifications ===
- Crew: 2
- Maximum duration: 40 days
- Orbit: Polar
- Length: 21.92 m (71.9 ft)
- Diameter: 3.05 m (10.0 ft)
- Habitable volume: 11.3 m^{3} (400 cu ft)
- Gross mass: 14,476 kg (31,914 lb)
- Payload: 2,700 kg (6,000 lb)
- Power: fuel cells or solar cells
- Reaction control system: N_{2}O_{4} / MMH

=== Space station layout ===
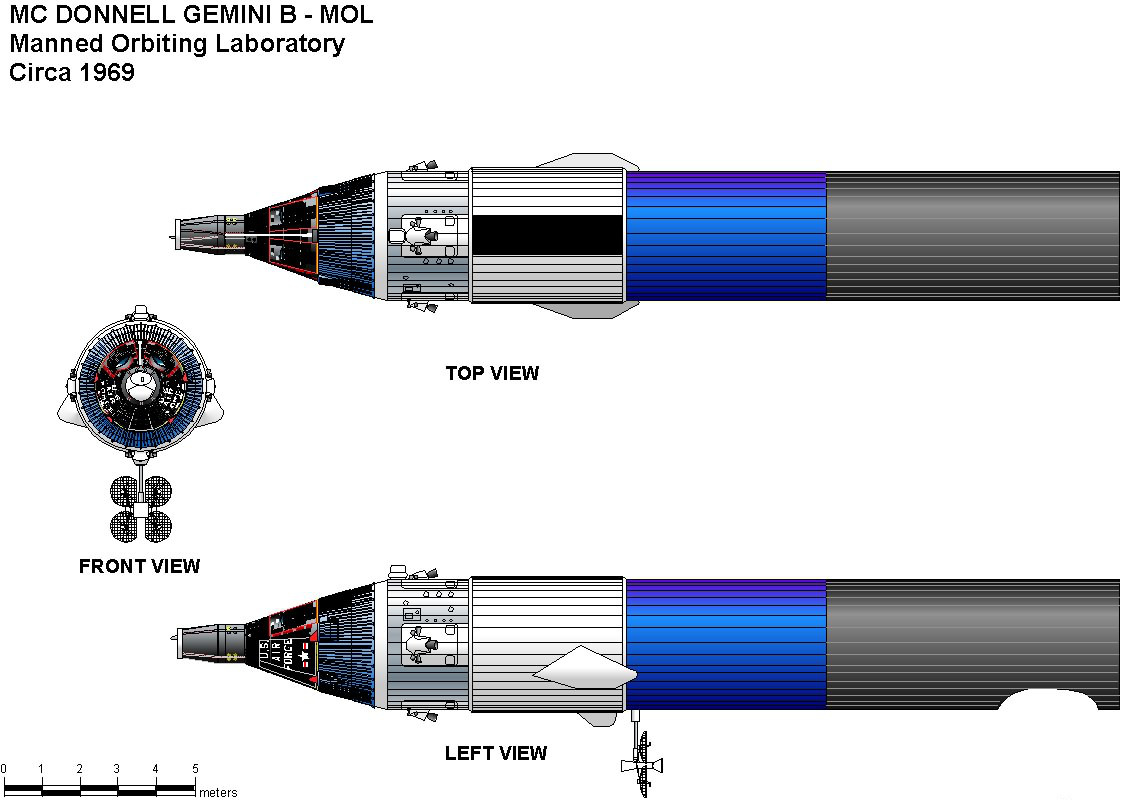
MOL main features

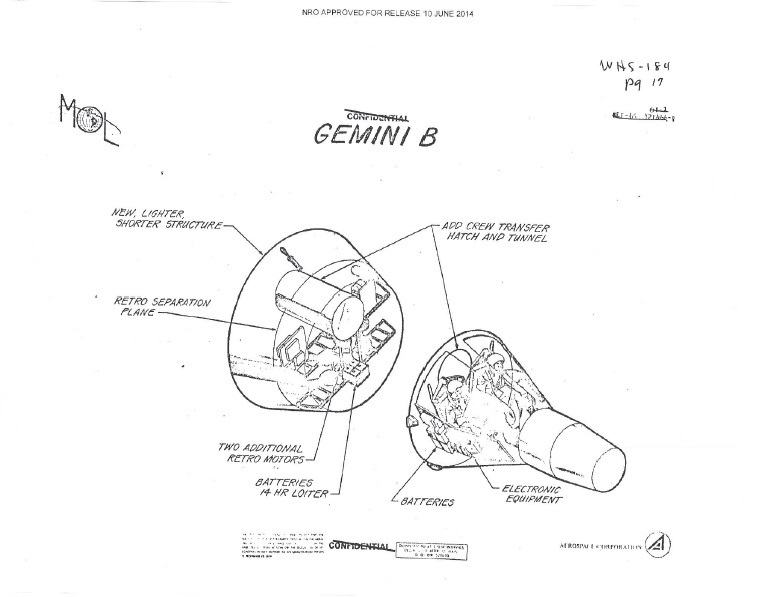
Gemini B layout

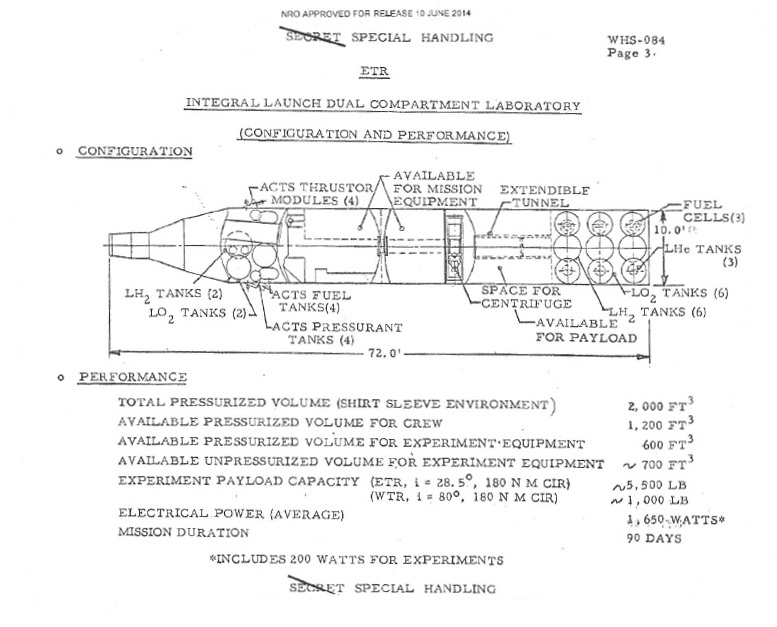
Integral launch dual compartment laboratory

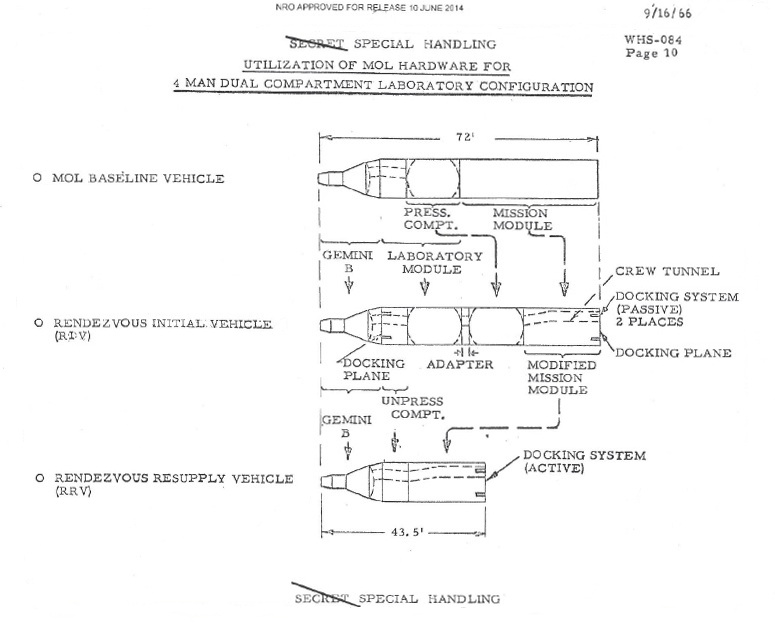
MOL variations

== Spacesuits ==
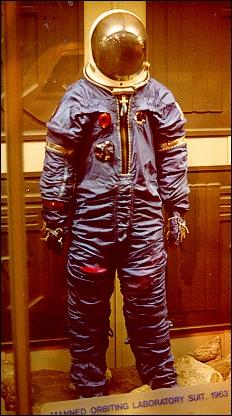
MOL MH-7 training spacesuit

The MOL program's requirements for a spacesuit were a product of the spacecraft design. The Gemini B capsule had little room inside, and the MOL astronauts gained access to the laboratory through a hatch in the heat shield. This required a more flexible suit than those of NASA astronauts. The NASA astronauts had custom-made sets of flight, training and backup suits, but for the MOL the intention was that spacesuits would be provided in standard sizes with adjustable elements. The USAF sounded out the David Clark Company, International Latex Corporation, B. F. Goodrich and Hamilton Standard for design proposals in 1964. Hamilton Standard and David Clark each developed four prototype suits for the MOL.

A competition was held at Wright-Patterson Air Force Base in January 1967, and a production contract awarded to Hamilton Standard. At least 17 blue MOL MH-7 training suits were delivered between May 1968 and July 1969. A single MH-8 flight configuration suit was delivered in October 1968 for certification testing. The flight suit was intended to be worn during launch and reentry.

The contract for the launch/reentry suit was followed by a second competition in September 1967 for a suit for extravehicular activity (EVA). This too was won by Hamilton Standard. The design was complicated by USAF concerns that a crew member might slip their tethers and float away. As a result, an astronaut maneuvering unit (AMU) was developed and integrated with the life support system as an integrated maneuvering and life support system (IMLSS). The design was completed by October 1968, and a prototype without cover garments was delivered in March 1969. The cover garments were never completed.

== Facilities ==
=== Launch complex ===
The military director of the NRO, Brigadier General John L. Martin Jr., suggested that MOL launches be made from Cape Kennedy, as launches from the West Coast implied a polar orbit, which would lead to the assumption that the objective of the mission was reconnaissance. This was considered, but there were practical issues. MOL needed to be flown in a polar orbit, but a launch due south from Cape Kennedy would overfly southern Florida, which raised safety concerns. The TIROS weather satellites had performed a "dog leg" maneuver, flying east and then south to avoid southern Florida. This required special State Department approval, as it meant overflying Cuba. The loss of an MOL with a classified payload over Cuba would be not only a danger to life and property, but a serious security concern as well. Moreover, the dog leg maneuver would reduce the 14,000-kilogram (30,000 lb) orbital payload by 900 to 2,300 kilograms (2,000 to 5,000 lb), reducing the equipment that could be carried or the duration of the mission or both. The cost of construction of a Titan III facility, including the purchase of the land, was estimated to be US$31 million (equivalent to $228 million in 2024), and the required supporting ground equipment would cost another US$79 million (equivalent to $582 million in 2024).

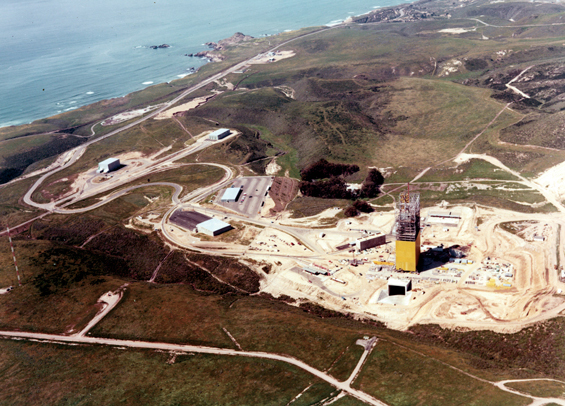
Space Launch Complex 6 under construction

The announcement that the MOL would be launched from the Western Test Range caused an outcry in the Florida news media, which decried it as a wasteful duplication of facilities, given that the recently completed US$154 million (equivalent to $1134 million in 2024) Cape Canaveral Space Launch Complex 41 was specifically built to handle Titan III launches. The Chairman of the House Committee on Science and Astronautics, Congressman George P. Miller from California, convened a special hearing on the MOL program on 7 February 1966. The first witness, the Associate Administrator of NASA, Robert Seamans, supported the MOL program, and the decision to launch satellites into polar orbit from the West Coast, and said that NASA planned to launch weather satellites from there. He was followed by Schriever, who detailed the issues involved. The arguments did not satisfy Floridians. Hearings in the House were followed by ones in the Senate before the Committee on Aeronautical and Space Sciences on 24 February 1966, chaired by the influential Senator Clinton P. Anderson. This time the witnesses were Seamans, Flax and John S. Foster Jr., Brown's successor as DDR&E. The logic of the arguments and the united front presented dampened criticism, and none of the nine members of the House from Florida opposed the 1966 MOL budget allocation.

The USAF attempted to purchase the land to the south of Vandenberg Air Force Base for the new space launch complex from the owners, but negotiations failed to reach agreement on a suitable price. The government then went ahead and condemned the land under eminent domain, acquiring 5,829.4 hectares (14,404.7 acres) from the Sudden Ranch and 202.0 hectares (499.1 acres) from the Scolari Ranch for $9,002,500 (equivalent to $66.3 million in 2024). Ground was broken on the new Space Launch Complex 6 (SLC-6) on 12 March 1966. Work on preparing the site was completed on 22 August. This involved 1.1 million cubic meters (1.4 million cubic yards) of earthworks, and the construction of access roads, a water supply pipeline and a railroad siding.

By this time, the design of the launch complex had progressed to the point at which it was possible to call for bids for its construction. Major items included a launch pad, umbilical tower, mobile services tower, aerospace ground equipment building, propellant loading and storage systems, launch control center, segment receipt inspection building, ready building, protective clothing building, and complex service building. Seven bids for the construction contract were received, and it was awarded to the lowest bidder, Santa Fe and Stolte of Lancaster, California. The contract was valued at US$20.2 million (equivalent to $149 million in 2024). Construction work was overseen by the United States Army Corps of Engineers. The launch control center, segment receipt inspection building and ready building were accepted by the USAF in August 1968.

=== Easter Island ===
In the event of an abort, the Gemini B spacecraft could have come down in the eastern Pacific Ocean. To prepare for this contingency, an agreement was reached with Chile on 26 July 1968 for the use of Easter Island as a staging area for search and rescue aircraft and helicopters. Works included resurfacing the 2,000-meter (6,600 ft) runway, taxiways and parking areas with asphalt, and establishing communications, aircraft maintenance and storage facilities, and accommodation for 100 personnel.

=== Rochester ===
A Camera Optical Assembly (COA) facility was constructed at Eastman Kodak in Rochester, New York. It included a new steel frame building and a masonry building with 13,120 square meters (141,200 sq ft) of test chambers, built at a cost of US$32,500,000 (equivalent to $246 million in 2024). The laboratory was dug into the ground so observers would not realize how large it was.

== Test flight ==
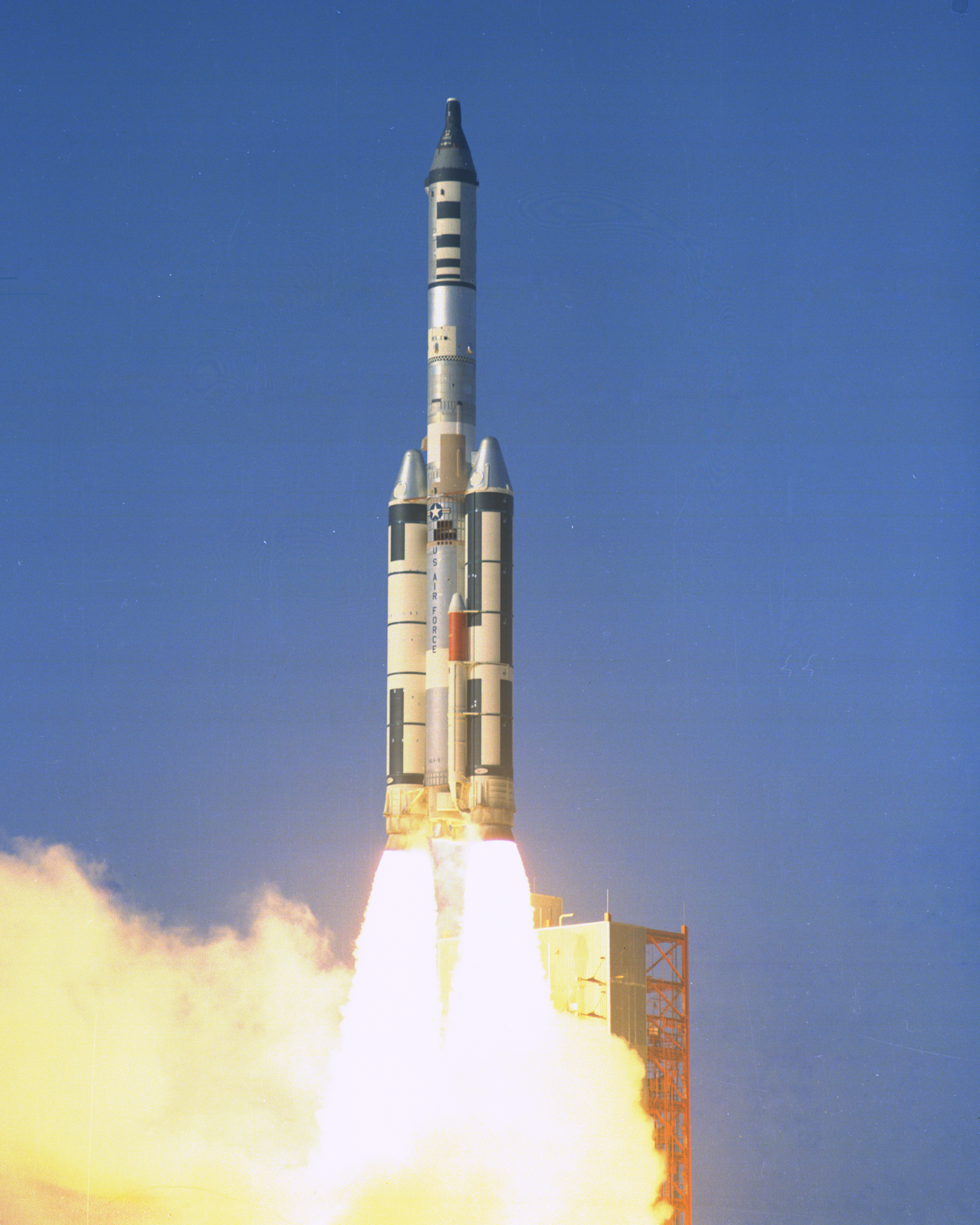
MOL test launch OPS 0855 on 3 November 1966 from Cape Canaveral, Florida

A MOL test flight was launched from Cape Canaveral Space Launch Complex 40 on 3 November 1966 at 13:50:42 UTC, on a Titan IIIC, vehicle C-9. The flight consisted of an MOL mockup built from a Titan II propellant tank, and Gemini spacecraft No. 2, which had been refurbished as a prototype Gemini B spacecraft. This was the first time an American spacecraft intended for human spaceflight had flown in space twice, albeit without a crew. The adapter connecting the Gemini spacecraft to the laboratory mockup contained three other spacecraft: two OV4-1 satellites and an OV1-6 satellite. The Gemini B spacecraft separated for a suborbital reentry, while the MOL mockup continued into low Earth orbit, where it released the three satellites.

The simulated laboratory contained eleven experiments. The Manifold experimental package consisted of two micrometeoroid detection payloads, a transmitter beacon designated ORBIS-Low, a cell growth experiment, a prototype hydrogen fuel cell, a thermal control experiment, a propellent transfer and monitoring system to investigate fluid dynamics in zero gravity, a prototype attitude control system, an experiment to investigate the reflection of light in space, and an experiment into heat transfer. The spacecraft was painted to allow it to be used as a target for an optical tracking and observation experiment from the ground. Eight of the eleven experiments were successful.

The hatch installed in the Gemini's heat shield to provide access to the MOL during crewed operations was tested during the capsule's reentry. The Gemini capsule was recovered near Ascension Island in the South Atlantic by the USS La Salle after a flight of 33 minutes. The laboratory mockup entered an orbit with an apogee of 305 kilometers (165 nmi), a perigee of 298 kilometers (161 nmi), and 32.8 degrees of inclination. It remained in orbit until its orbital decay on 9 January 1967.

== Public response ==
With the 1966 Eighteen Nation Committee on Disarmament approaching, there were concerns about how the MOL was viewed by the international community. The United States insisted that the MOL was in line with the 17 October 1963 United Nations General Assembly resolution that the exploration and use of outer space should be used only "for the betterment of mankind". To allay Soviet fears that the MOL would carry nuclear weapons, the State Department suggested that Soviet officials be permitted to inspect it for them before launch, but Brown opposed this on security grounds.

Public debate of the merits of the MOL program was hobbled by its semi-secret nature. Writing about the MOL as an outsider in 1967, Leonard E. Schwartz, a consultant to the Directorate for Scientific Affairs of the OECD, noted that the United States already had SAMOS satellites for reconnaissance and Vela satellites for surveillance of nuclear explosions, but without knowing their capabilities or those of MOL, could not evaluate the actual costs or benefits of the program.

Publicly, the Air Force vaguely described the MOL as "an effective space building block of very substantial potential, a space resource capable of growth to follow-on tasks". "On completion", Brady declared in 1965, "we will have configured, acquired, and most important, conducted a manned military space operation thereby acquiring the crews, experience and equipment that will, if required, allow the Air Force to move into the near-earth space environment in an orderly and effective manner".

The Soviet Union commissioned the development of its own military space station, Almaz. This project was initiated by chief-designer Vladimir Chelomey on 12 October 1964, but it was Johnson's announcement of the MOL program on 25 August 1965 that led to the Almaz project receiving official endorsement and funding on 27 October 1965. Three Almaz space stations flew as Salyut space stations between 1973 and 1976 before the crewed Almaz program was canceled in 1978.

== Delays and cost increases ==
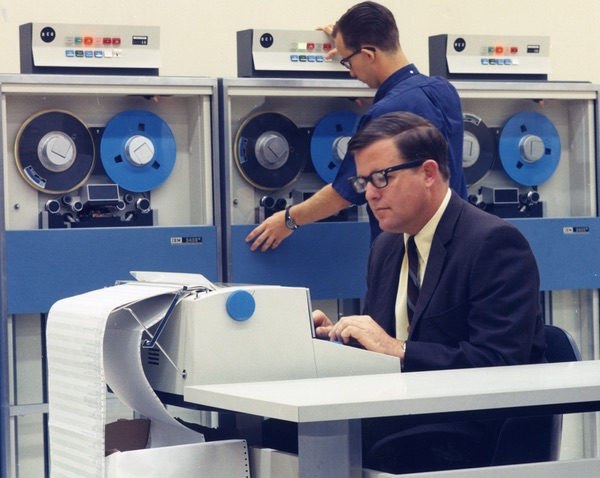
The MOL program used state-of-the-art computers for design and simulation.

Within weeks of Johnson's announcement of the MOL program, it was facing budget cuts. In November 1965, Flax arbitrarily cut US$20 million (equivalent to $151 million in 2024) from the MOL program's fiscal year 1967 budget, bringing it down to US$374 million (equivalent to $2832 million in 2024). Brown learned that McNamara intended to limit the program to US$150 million (equivalent to $1105 million in 2024) in fiscal year 1967, the same allocation as in fiscal year 1966, in response to the rising cost of the Vietnam War. In August 1965, the first uncrewed qualification flight had been expected to take place in late 1968, with the first crewed mission in early 1970, on the assumption that engineering development would commence in January 1966. Since this was now unlikely, McNamara saw no reason to continue with the original budget. Brown examined the schedules, advising McNamara that a crewed mission in April 1969 would require a minimum of US$294 million (equivalent to $2165 million in 2024) in fiscal year 1967, and that the minimum budget that the MOL program required was US$230 million (equivalent to $1694 million in 2024), which would impose a delay of the first flight of three to eighteen months. McNamara was unmoved, and US$150 million (equivalent to $981 million in 2024) was the sum requested in the budget submitted to Congress in January 1966.

When the MOL engineering development phase commenced in September 1966, it became clear that the USAF estimates of project costs and those of the major contractors were a long way apart. McDonnell requested US$205.5 million (equivalent to $1513 million in 2024) for a fixed price plus incentive fee (FPIF) contract to design and build Gemini B, which the USAF budgeted at US$147.9 million (equivalent to $1089 million in 2024); Douglas wanted US$815.8 million (equivalent to $6007 million in 2024) for the laboratory vehicles which the USAF budgeted at US$611.3 million (equivalent to $4502 million in 2024); and General Electric sought US$198 million (equivalent to $1458 million in 2024) for work budgeted at US$147.3 million (equivalent to $1085 million in 2024). In response the MOL SPO reopened negotiations for systems not under contract, and halted the issuance of Dorian clearances to contractor personnel. This had the desired effect, and by December 1966, the major contractors had reduced their prices, bringing them closer to the USAF estimates. However, on 7 January 1967, the Office of the Secretary of Defense (OSD) informed the MOL SPO that it intended to limit contracts in fiscal year 1968 to US$430 million (equivalent to $3166 million in 2024), which was US$157 million (equivalent to $1156 million in 2024) short of what the MOL SPO wanted, and US$381 million (equivalent to $2806 million in 2024) below what the contractors wanted. This meant that the prime contracts had to be renegotiated.

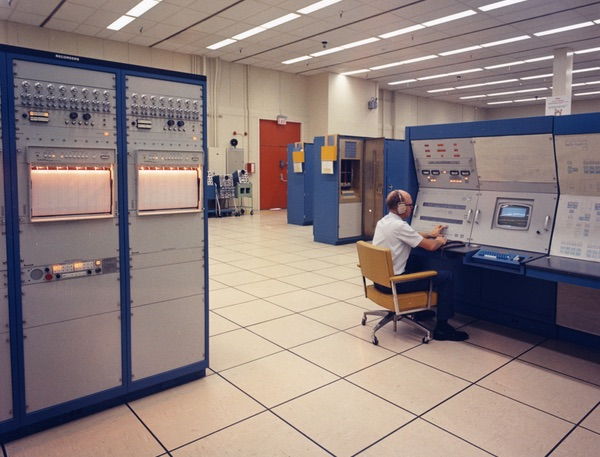
MOL computer center

Budget cuts were not the only reason for the project's schedule slipping. On 9 December 1966, Eastman Kodak advised that it would not be able to deliver the optical sensors by the original target date of January 1969 for a crewed mission in April 1969, and asked for a ten-month extension to October 1969, which pushed the date of the first crewed mission back to January 1970. Eventually, US$480 million (equivalent to $3535 million in 2024) was found for fiscal year 1968, with US$50 million (equivalent to $368 million in 2024) obtained by reprogramming funds from other programs, and US$661 million (equivalent to $4868 million in 2024) agreed upon for fiscal year 1969. To accommodate this, the date of the first qualification flight was pushed back still further, to December 1970, with the first crewed mission in August 1971.

On 17 May 1967, a US$674,703,744 FPIF contract (equivalent to $4.83 billion in 2024) was signed with Douglas, which also received US$13 million (equivalent to $93 million in 2024) in black budget funds. A US$180,469,000 FPIF contract (equivalent to $1.29 billion in 2024) was signed with McDonnell the following day, and a US$110,020,000 (equivalent to $810 million in 2024) to General Electric, which was expected to receive another US$60 million in black budget funds (equivalent to $429 million in 2024). The delays increased the projected costs of the MOL program to US$2.35 billion (equivalent to $17 billion in 2024).

As MOL deputy director, Bleymaier in early 1968 asked his astronauts for advice. Aware of the program's budgetary and political difficulties, they asked him to promise that the first launch would be fully operational. This would cancel two uncrewed qualification missions, the first in December 1970; the August 1971 crewed flight would be the first MOL launch and first operational mission. In March 1968, Congress appropriated US$515 million (equivalent to $3535 million in 2024) for fiscal year 1969, and the MOL SPO was directed to plan on the basis of a US$600 million appropriation (equivalent to $3925 million in 2024) for fiscal year 1970. This entailed yet another schedule slippage. On 15 July 1968, the MOL SPO convened a conference with major contractors in Valley Forge, Pennsylvania, and it was agreed to defer the first crewed mission from August to December 1971.

== Usefulness of humans ==
A few months after MOL development began, the program began developing an automated MOL that replaced the crew compartment with film reentry vehicles. Human reconnaissance from space was tested on Gemini 5 in 1965, which conducted 17 USAF military experiments, including photographing missile launches from Vandenberg Air Force Base, and observations of the White Sands Proving Ground. NPIC—which reviewed all NASA astronaut photographs of Earth before release—found that the Gemini photographs were not useful, lacking data on what the camera was aimed at. As automated technology improved, however, those within the MOL program increasingly feared that astronauts were being eliminated. Al Crews said "it became obvious that all we were was a backup in case the unmanned reconnaissance system didn't work". Although Crippen did not think automation could completely replace astronauts, he agreed with Crews that automation technology was rapidly improving.

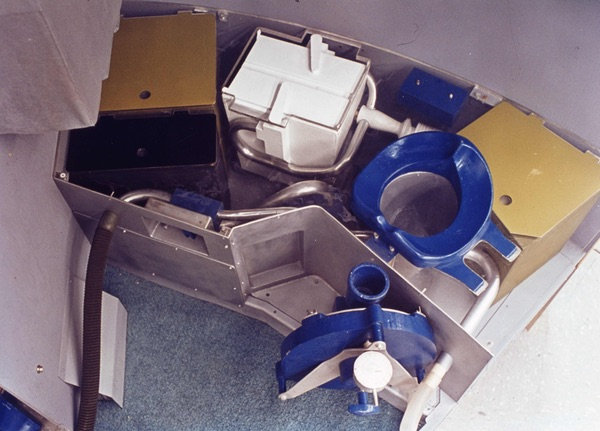
A mockup of the toilet that would have been carried on MOL. Catering for the crew complicated spacecraft design.

In February 1966, Schriever commissioned a report examining humans' usefulness on the station. The report, which was submitted on 25 May 1966, concluded that they would be useful in several ways, but implied that the program would always need to justify the cost and difficulty of the MOL versus a robotic version. Although it did not fly until July 1966, the authors were aware of the capabilities and limitations of the KH-8 Gambit 3. It could not achieve the same resolution as the Dorian camera on MOL, and the automation necessitated a longer development time and added weight, but the Dorian camera had a resolution of 33 to 38 centimeters (13 to 15 in), could remain in orbit longer, and carry more film than earlier spy satellites.

The report's authors concluded that the justification for manned MOL was stronger than they had believed. Crewed systems had many advantages over automated ones, which lost up to half their images to cloud cover on a typical mission. A human could select the best angle for a photograph, and could switch between color and infrared, or some other special film, depending on the target. This was especially useful for dealing with camouflaged targets. The MOL also had the ability to change orbits, and could shift from its regular 280 km (150 nmi) orbit to a 370-to-560 km (200-to-300 nmi) one, giving it a view of the entire Soviet Union.

The authors believed that an uncrewed MOL would more likely fail early missions and slowly improve, while a crewed MOL would be "self-healing" and crews would not repeat mistakes. Experience on Projects Mercury, Gemini and the X-15 had demonstrated that crew initiative, innovation and improvisation were often the difference between the success and failure of the mission. Because of the early failures, they predicted that uncrewed MOL would always be less successful overall than crewed MOL regardless of the number of missions. After crewed MOL perfected the system, the program could fly both uncrewed and crewed missions, the report stated.

Debate also persisted about the value of the very high resolution (VHR) imaging being developed for MOL and KH-9 Hexagon, or whether the resolution provided by Gambit 3 was sufficient. After the Liberty incident in June 1967 and the Pueblo incident in January 1968, there was an increased focus on intelligence gathering by satellite. The Director of Central Intelligence, Richard M. Helms, commissioned a report on the value of VHR, which was completed in May 1968. It concluded that it would help identify smaller items and features, and increase the understanding of Soviet procedures and processes, and the capacities of some of its industrial facilities, it would not alter estimates of technical capabilities, or assessments of the size and deployment of forces. Whether the benefit justified the cost was unclear, but by 1968 USAF decided that the automated system's longer development time and less certain capability meant that the first MOL missions required astronauts. Later ones could be crewed or automated as needed.

== Cancellation ==
On 20 January 1969, Richard Nixon was sworn in as president. He instructed the director of the new Bureau of the Budget, Robert Mayo, and the Secretary of Defense, Melvin Laird, to find ways to cut defense spending. The MOL was an obvious target; an article in the Washington Monthly titled "How The Pentagon Can Save $9 Billion", written by Robert S. Benson, a former Department of Defense employee, described the MOL as a program that "receives a half a billion dollars a year and ought to rank dead last on any rational scale of national priorities". MOL competed for funding with CIA's Hexagon. While the goals of the two programs were different, they both used Titan III launchers and had comparably expensive budgets. NRO already had the much cheaper Gambit 3. The program was launching steadily improving satellites every two months, and ground resolution might be comparable to MOL by the latter's first launch in 1972.

Stewart briefed the new Deputy Secretary of Defense, David Packard, on MOL, which Stewart described as the best path to VHR at the earliest date. Laird, who as a congressman had criticized McNamara for inadequately funding the MOL program, was favorably disposed towards the MOL program, as was Seamans, who was now the Secretary of the Air Force. On 6 March, Packard directed Foster to proceed on the basis of $556 million for fiscal year 1970 (equivalent to $3637 million in 2024). This entailed postponement of the first crewed mission to February 1972.

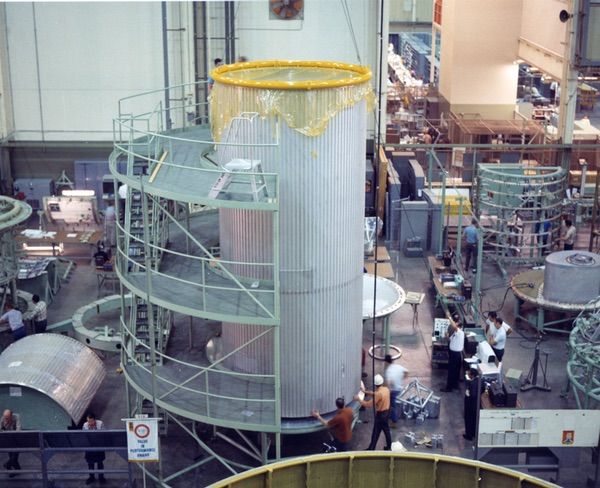
MOL hardware under construction

The Bureau of the Budget did not accept Laird's decision. Mayo argued that the resolution provided by Gambit 3 was adequate, and proposed canceling both the MOL and Hexagon. An MOL mission was expected to cost $150 million (equivalent to $981 million in 2024), but a Gambit 3 launch cost only $23 million (equivalent to $150 million in 2024). The value of VHR, Mayo argued, was not worth the extra cost. On 9 April, Nixon reduced the MOL's funding to $360 million (equivalent to $2355 million in 2024), and canceled Hexagon.

Packard and CIA's Helms asked the President to reverse the decision, arguing that Hexagon's ability to photograph large areas was more important for arms control—which Nixon emphasized—than MOL's high-resolution photographs of smaller areas. In May, a reconnaissance advisory panel led by Edwin Land recommended MOL's cancellation and using Dorian's technology in unmanned form. MOL's reduction in funding meant further postponement of the first crewed flight, by up to a year, and the Bureau of the Budget continued to press for the MOL to be canceled. In a last ditch attempt to save MOL, Laird, Seamans, and Stewart met with Nixon at the White House on 17 May, and briefed him on the history of the program. Seamans even offered to find $250 million (equivalent to $1636 million in 2024) to continue the program from elsewhere in the USAF budget. They thought the meeting went well, but Nixon accepted the Bureau of the Budget's recommendation to reverse his decision to cancel Hexagon and to cancel the MOL instead.

On 7 June 1969, Stewart ordered Bleymaier to cease all work on Gemini B, the Titan IIIM and the MOL spacesuit, and to cancel or curtail all other contracts. The official announcement that the MOL had been canceled was made on 10 June. One MOL astronaut heard the news on the radio while driving to work. Thousands of workers lost their jobs, including 500 at Kodak alone.

Had it flown as scheduled, MOL would have been the world's first space station. Lew Allen, who worked in NRO and became a USAF general in the 1970s, thought that deciding to build an unmanned MOL resulted in design changes that caused the program's cancellation. NRO director John McLucas wrote that MOL's budget had become unacceptable, with "little tangible to show for the $1.4 billion spent". Some believed that MOL should have launched astronauts before the optics were ready. Abrahamson later concurred that his and other MOL astronauts' advice to fly the first mission fully operational was a mistake. He learned while serving as Deputy Administrator of NASA in the early 1980s that launching anything, even "an empty can", made cancellation of a project less likely. Al Crews believed that automated systems were probably superior, and said that when he saw high-resolution photographs from Gambit 3 he knew that MOL would be canceled. Allen, by 1981 Chief of Staff of the Air Force, reportedly said that year that human spaceflight was not useful. He had helped to cancel MOL and, the general said, he would have canceled the Space Shuttle program too. Although describing his training as a payload specialist for STS-62-A as "the most exciting time of my life", Edward C. Aldridge, Jr.—NRO head during the mid-1980s—said in 2009 that MOL was canceled:

... because we couldn't find where having men in that satellite was beneficial. In fact, it was harmful. You had to put a life support system in it. The cameras—that now we can talk about—that were on the satellite, people moving around in the satellite created 'noise.' You didn't want anybody around. So you look at the cost and the complexity, so the program was terminated.

== Legacy ==
McLucas wrote that canceling MOL saved the government $1.5 billion over the following three years. NRO received some of the savings, and an official with the non-NRO Defense Support Program said that "MOL saved our ass".

Following the cancellation, a committee was formed to handle the disposal of its assets, valued at US$12.5 million (equivalent to $82 million in 2024). The Acquisition and Tracking System, Mission Development Simulator, Laboratory Module Simulator, and Mission Simulator were transferred to NASA by the end of 1973. The MOL Program Office at the Pentagon closed on 15 February 1970, and the office in Los Angeles on 30 September 1970. The Director of Space Systems, Brigadier General Allen, became the point of contact for contracts that were terminated, but those with Aerojet, McDonnell Douglas, and the United Technologies Corporation (UTC) were still open in June 1973. The Aerojet contract had only small claims totaling US$9,888 (equivalent to $64,690 in 2024), but there remained reservations of US$771,569 (equivalent to $4.15 million in 2024) on the McDonnell Douglas contract due to a subcontractor dispute and California franchise tax. The UTC contract was still worth up to US$51 million (equivalent to $274 million in 2024), the actual amount depending on how much work was attributable to the MOL, and how much to the ongoing work on Titan III.

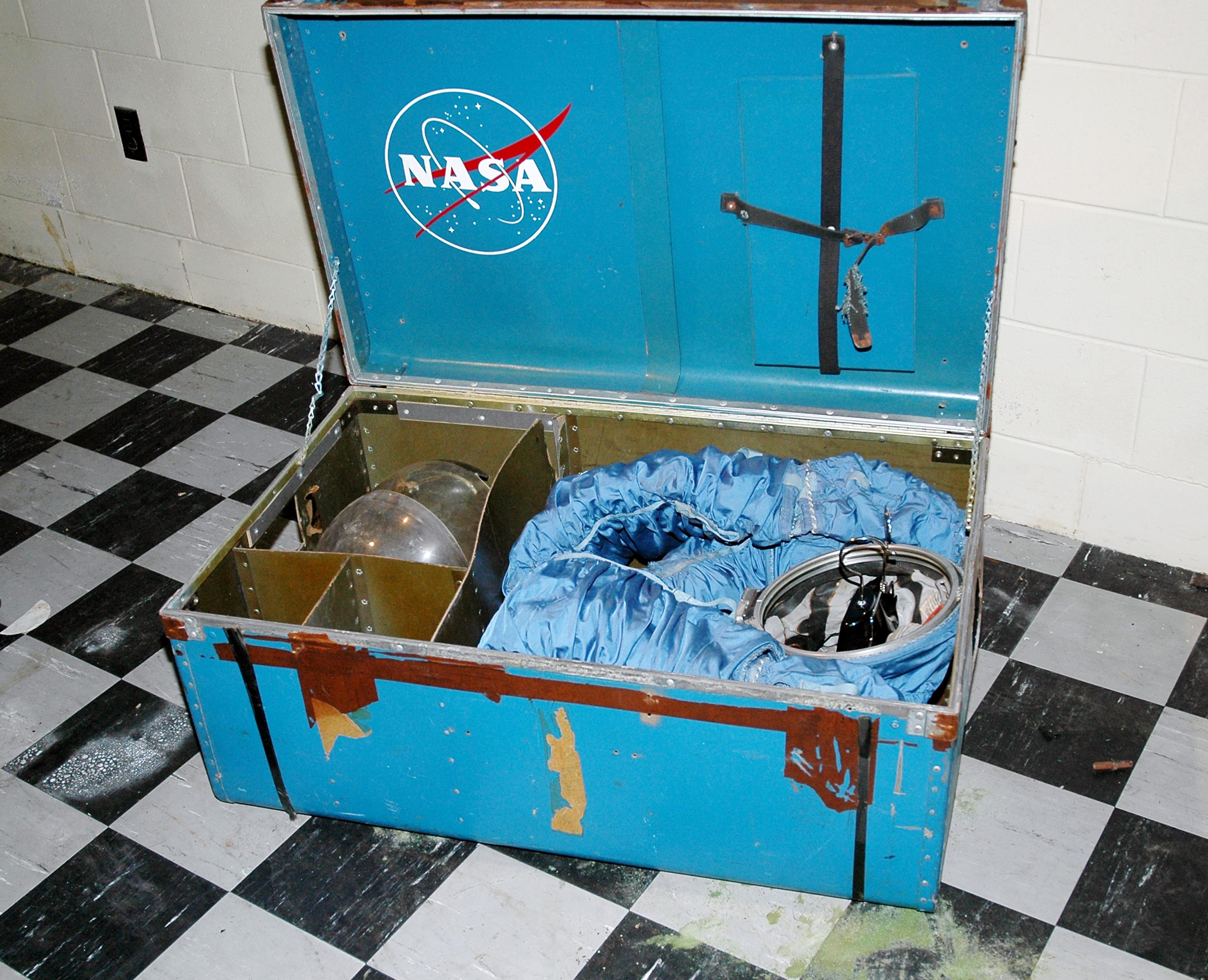
MH-7 training suit

At the time the MOL was canceled, 192 service and 100 civilian personnel were employed on MOL activities. Within weeks, 80 percent of the service personnel were given new duty assignments. The civilians were reassigned to the Space and Missile Systems Organization (SAMSO). The service personnel included fourteen of the seventeen MOL astronauts. Finley had returned to the U.S. Navy in April 1968, and Adams had left in July 1966 to join the X-15 program. He flew in space on his seventh flight on 15 November 1967, only to be killed when his aircraft broke up. Lawrence had died in an F-104 crash at Edwards Air Force Base on 8 December 1967. All the remaining fourteen except Herres wanted to transfer to NASA. Deke Slayton, NASA Director of Flight Crew Operations, believed that he did not need more astronauts. George Mueller, NASA Deputy Administrator, wanted to maintain good relations with the USAF. Slayton took the seven MOL pilots 35 or younger as NASA Astronaut Group 7; all flew on the Space Shuttle, starting with Crippen on STS-1. NASA also took Crews as a test pilot, and he would fly NASA aircraft until 1994. Due to their exposure to highly classified information, those who did not transfer to NASA could not engage in combat for three years because of the risk of capture. Not being able to serve in Vietnam hurt their careers, and some soon left the military.

The Titan III booster became a mainstay of the military satellite program. The Titan IIIC version was capable of lifting 9,100 kilograms (20,000 lb) into low Earth orbit; its successor, the Titan IIID developed for Hexagon, could lift 14,000 kilograms (30,000 lb), and the Titan IIIM developed for the MOL would have been able to lift 17,000 kilograms (38,000 lb). NASA's Saturn IB could lift 16,000 kilograms (36,000 lb), but the cost of a Titan IIIM launch was half that of Saturn IB. The Titan IIIM never flew, but the UA1207 solid rocket boosters developed for the MOL were eventually used on the Titan IV, and the Space Shuttle Solid Rocket Boosters were based on materials, processes, and the UA1207 design developed for MOL, with only minor changes. NASA also used work on the Gemini B spacesuits for the agency's own suits, MOL's waste management system flew on Skylab, and NASA Earth Science used other MOL equipment. The prototype IMLSS is in the National Museum of the United States Air Force.

Gambit 3's resolution did eventually become comparable to Dorian's, in part using optics technology developed for Dorian. The Hubble Space Telescope, and KH-11 Kennen satellites that NRO began developing in 1971, also used the technology; by the 1980s Kennen reached Dorian's resolution or better. While no unmanned satellite used Dorian's own optics, mirrors had been ordered early in the program and were almost complete. Six honeycombed borosilicate glass mirrors made by Corning for MOL, each with a diameter of 180 centimeters (72 in), were combined to make the Multiple Mirror Telescope in Arizona, the third largest optical telescope in the world at the time of its dedication.

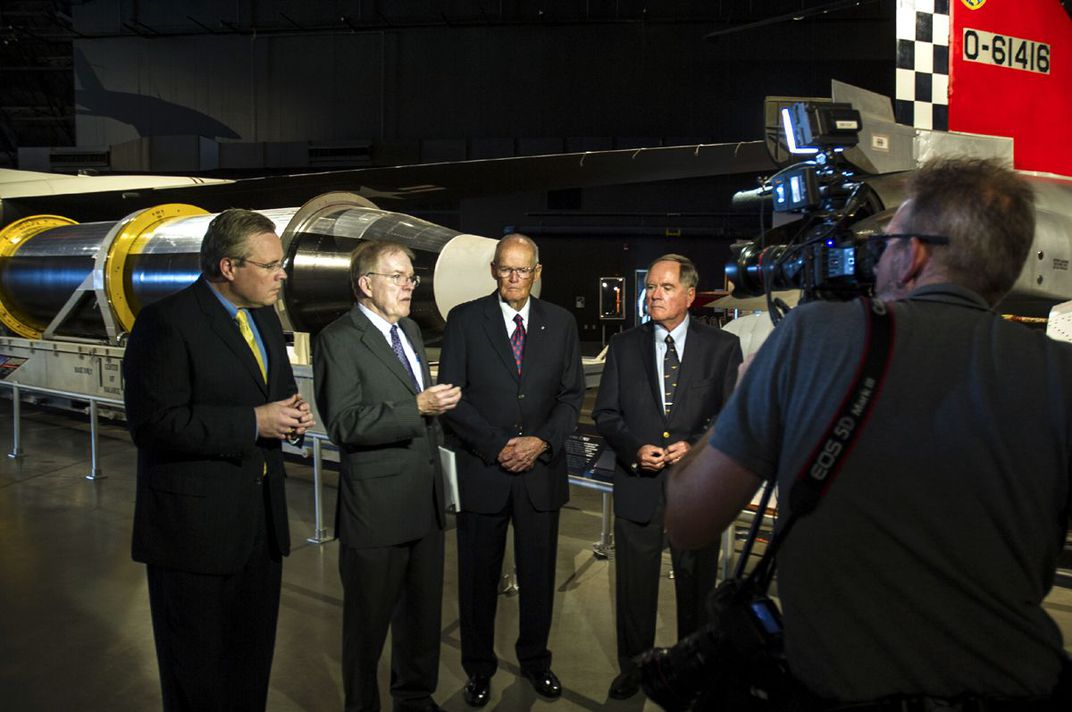
Reunion at the National Museum of the Air Force in 2015. Left to right: NRO chief historian James D. Outzen and former director Robert MacDonald, and MOL astronauts Al Crews and Bob Crippen.

At the time of cancellation, work on Space Launch Complex 6 was 92 percent complete. The main task remaining was conducting acceptance tests. It was decided to complete the construction and tests, but not install the aerospace ground equipment, and then place the facility in caretaker status, with a caretaker crew provided by the 6595th Aerospace Test Wing. In 1972, the USAF decided to refurbish SLC-6 for use with the Space Shuttle. This cost more than anticipated, some US$2.5 billion (equivalent to $6 billion in 2024), and the date of the first launch had to be postponed from June 1984 to July 1986. The airport runway at Easter Island developed for MOL was extended by another 430 meters (1,420 ft) to 3,370 meters (11,055 ft) to allow for an emergency Space Shuttle landing and a piggyback retrieval by a modified Boeing 747 Shuttle Carrier Aircraft, at a cost of US$7.5 million (equivalent to $19 million in 2024). Preparations were underway for STS-62-A, the launch of the Space Shuttle Discovery from SLC-6, commanded by MOL astronaut Bob Crippen and Aldridge aboard, when the Space Shuttle Challenger disaster occurred in January 1986. Plans for Space Shuttle launches from SLC-6 were abandoned, and none ever flew from there. No Space Shuttle was ever launched into a polar orbit. From 2006 to 2022, SLC-6 was used for Delta IV launches, including NRO KH-11 Kennan satellites. Currently, the launch site is getting converted by SpaceX to support Falcon 9 and Falcon Heavy launches starting in 2025.

Some items of MOL equipment made their way to museums. The Gemini B spacecraft used in the only flight of the MOL program is on display at the Air Force Space and Missile Museum at Cape Canaveral Air Force Station. A Gemini B spacecraft used for ground-based testing is on display at the National Museum of the United States Air Force at Wright-Patterson Air Force Base in Dayton, Ohio, (on loan from the National Air and Space Museum). Like the other Gemini B spacecraft, it is differentiated from the NASA Gemini spacecraft by the words "U.S. AIR FORCE" painted on it, with accompanying insignia, and by the circular hatch cut through its heat shield. Two MH-7 training spacesuits from the MOL program were discovered in a locked room in the Cape Canaveral Launch Complex 5 museum on Cape Canaveral in 2005. Crippen donated his MOL spacesuit to the National Air and Space Museum in 2017.

In July 2015, the NRO declassified over eight hundred files and photos related to the MOL program. A book by the Center for the Study of National Reconnaissance oral historian Courtney V.K. Homer about the MOL program, Spies in Space (2019), was based on documents released by the NRO and interviews she conducted with Abrahamson, Bobko, Crippen, Crews, Macleay, and Truly.
