= Attorney General Evans =

Attorney General Evans may refer to:

- Gareth Evans (politician) (born 1944), Attorney General of Australia
- George Evans (American politician) (1797–1867), Attorney General of Maine
- Tom Evans (Western Australian politician) (1929–1995), Attorney-General of Western Australia
- William Evans (Australian politician) (1856–1914), Attorney-General of Victoria

== See also ==
- Lois Browne-Evans (1927–2007), Attorney General of Bermuda
- General Evans (disambiguation)
