= Harry L. Evans =

United States Air Force general

- Born: 22 November 1919; Bedford, Iowa
- Died: 18 July 2008 (aged 88); Columbus, North Carolina
- Education: University of Michigan
- Military career
- Allegiance: United States
- Branch: United States Army (1940–1947); United States Air Force (1947–1967)
- Service years: 1940–1967
- Rank: Major general
- Commands: 1st Strategic Reconnaissance Squadron
- Conflicts: World War II: Air raids on Japan
- Awards: Legion of Merit; Distinguished Flying Cross; Air Medal (2); Purple Heart

Harry Lee Evans (22 November 1919 – 18 July 2008) was a major general in the United States Air Force (USAF). He enlisted in the United States Army Air Corps in 1940, and flew air raids on Japan during World War II. He served with the Armed Forces Special Weapons Project and the Ballistic Missile Division as program director of the Ballistic Missile Early Warning System. As vice director of the Samos Project Office, he was responsible for the early Air Force satellite systems and for the Air Force portion of the early Pioneer and Explorer space programs, and oversaw, in a management capacity, over fifty space and satellite launches. He was also assistant deputy commander and vice director of the Manned Orbiting Laboratory program.

== Early life ==
Harry Lee Evans was born in Bedford, Iowa, on 22 November 1919, the son of the Harry Evans and Clara Fowler Evans. He graduated from Joplin High School in Joplin, Missouri, in 1936, and from Northeastern Oklahoma Junior College, in Miami, Oklahoma, where he studied geophysical engineering, in 1938.

== World War II ==
In 1940, Evans enlisted in the United States Army Air Corps. He completed primary, basic and advanced pilot training at Randolph Field, Texas, and then the instructor and engineering officer courses there. He married Dixie Sandmire from Miami, Oklahoma, on 1 January 1941; they had no children.

Evans served as an instructor at Randolph Field until January 1943, when he was transferred to the 449th Base Headquarters and Air Base Squadron in Independence Army Airfield in Kansas, serving as a flight commander and then as the squadron commander. Evans graduated from the Command and General Staff College at Fort Leavenworth, Kansas, in 1944. He then underwent B-17 transition training at Roswell Army Air Field in New Mexico, and was assigned to the Boeing B-29 Superfortress program. In March 1945, Evans joined the 29th Bombardment Group on Guam as a group officer and then the deputy group commander. The B-29s of the 29th Bombardment Group conducted air raids on Japan, and he flew eighteen combat missions.

== Post-war ==
In December 1945, Evans returned to the United States, and as assigned to Santa Ana Army Air Base in California, until March 1946, when he became the executive officer, and then commander of the 25th Air Service Group at March Field in California, and then Davis-Monthan Field in Arizona. In September 1946, he entered the University of Oklahoma, from which he received a Bachelor of Science degree in 1948. He was posted to Japan, where he commanded the 1st Strategic Reconnaissance Squadron. In 1949 the squadron moved to Fairfield-Suisun Army Air Field in California, where it became the first squadron in the United States Air Force (USAF) to receive the RB-36 Peacemaker, the reconnaissance version of the B-36.

Evans graduated from the Senior Officers Military management Course at Craig Air Force Base in 1950, and was then chosen to attend a two-year course on guided missiles at the University of Michigan, for which he was awarded a Master of Science degree in June 1952. He then became chief of the Weapons Program Branch of the Field Command of the Armed Forces Special Weapons Project and then chief of staff of the 1090th Special Reporting Wing at Sandia Base, New Mexico.

From June 1956 to June 1957, Evans attended the Air War College at Maxwell Air Force Base in Alabama. He then joined the Ballistic Missile Division as program director of the Ballistic Missile Early Warning System. In November 1960, he became vice director of the Samos Project Office in El Segundo, California. He was also deputy director of Project A, the Air Force component of the National Reconnaissance Office. As such, he was responsible for the early Air Force satellite systems and for the Air Force portion of the early Pioneer and Explorer space programs, and oversaw, in a management capacity, over fifty space and satellite launches.

In November 1962, Evans became chief of the Requirements and Development Division in J-5 (Plans and Policy) Division of the Office of the Joint Chiefs of Staff at The Pentagon in Washington, DC. At the conclusion of this tour in February 1965, he was appointed the assistant deputy commander for Manned Orbiting Laboratory program, with his office at Andrews Air Force Base. In August 1965, he became the vice director of the Manned Orbiting Laboratory Program in the Office of the Secretary of the Air Force. His final assignment was as the assistant to the commander of Air Force Systems Command in March 1967.

Evans retired on 1 June 1967 with the rank of major general. His decorations included the Legion of Merit, the Distinguished Flying Cross, the Air Medal with oak leaf cluster, and the Purple Heart.

== Later life ==
After retiring from the Air Force, Evans joined the guided missile systems division of Raytheon Corporation. He retired in 1973, and moved to Tryon Estates, a retirement community in Columbus, North Carolina. He died on 18 July 2008.

== Dates of rank ==
Insignia	Rank	Component	Date	Reference
	Second lieutenant	Air Corps	28 November 1940	
	First lieutenant (temporary)	Army of the United States	1 March 1942	
	First lieutenant (temporary)	Air Corps	29 May 1942	
	Captain (temporary)	Army of the United States	12 December 1942	
	Major (temporary)	Army of the United States	24 November 1943	
	Captain	Air Corps	16 December 1943	
	Major	Air Corps	1 August 1944	
	Lieutenant colonel (temporary)	Army of the United States	1 December 1945	
	Lieutenant colonel	United States Air Force	19 October 1950	
	Colonel (temporary)	United States Air Force	9 April 1954	
	Colonel	United States Air Force	1 July 1958	
	Brigadier general (temporary)	United States Air Force	1 July 1962	
	Major general	United States Air Force	17 February 1967	
