= Lachlan Macleay =

American test pilot and USAF colonel (born 1931)

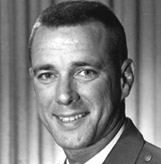
- Born: June 13, 1931 (age 95); Saint Louis, Missouri, U.S.
- Education: USNA, B.S. 1954; University of Southern California, MBA 1970
- Occupation: Test pilot
- Space career

USAF astronaut
- Status: Retired
- Rank: Colonel, USAF
- Selection: 1965 USAF MOL Group 1
- Mission: None

Lachlan "Mac" Macleay (born June 13, 1931) is a retired colonel in the United States Air Force and a former USAF astronaut. Although he trained for the USAF Manned Orbital Laboratory (MOL), the program was cancelled before any of the MOL crews reached space.

Macleay was born in Saint Louis, Missouri, and graduated in 1954 from the United States Naval Academy with a Bachelor of Science degree in electrical engineering. Although a USNA graduate, he chose to begin his career in the United States Air Force. In 1970, he earned a Master of Business Administration degree from the University of Southern California.

Macleay was a flight instructor in the F-86D at Moody Air Force Base in Georgia. He graduated from the U.S. Air Force Test Pilot School in Class 60A, Aerospace Research Pilot School (ARPS) Class IV, and MOL. In 1965, Macleay was selected as one of the first astronauts to the Air Force's classified Manned Orbital Laboratory. The MOL program, canceled in 1969 before sending any astronauts into space, was to man a military space station with Air Force astronauts using a modified Gemini spacecraft.

The MOL program was not as memorable to me as the friends I made there. I got to be around some of the smartest and most dedicated people in the world, and I wouldn't trade that for anything.

— Macleay, describing his MOL experience.

Macleay continued flying for the Air Force and served a combat tour in Southeast Asia during the Vietnam War as commander of the 23rd Tactical Air Support Squadron (TASS) at Nakhon Phanom, Thailand. The 23d TASS, flying the OV-10 Bronco under the callsign Nail, served as forward air controllers directing air strikes against enemy troops.

Macleay retired from the Air Force on May 1, 1978, and joined Hughes Aircraft in Tucson, Arizona, where he worked on a series of missile systems. He currently lives in Colorado Springs, Colorado.

The history of the MOL program was presented in the Public Television series NOVA episode called Astrospies which aired February 12, 2008. Several of the MOL astronauts, including Lachlan Macleay, were interviewed for this documentary.
