= Approach and Landing Tests =

Trials of the prototype Space Shuttle Enterprise

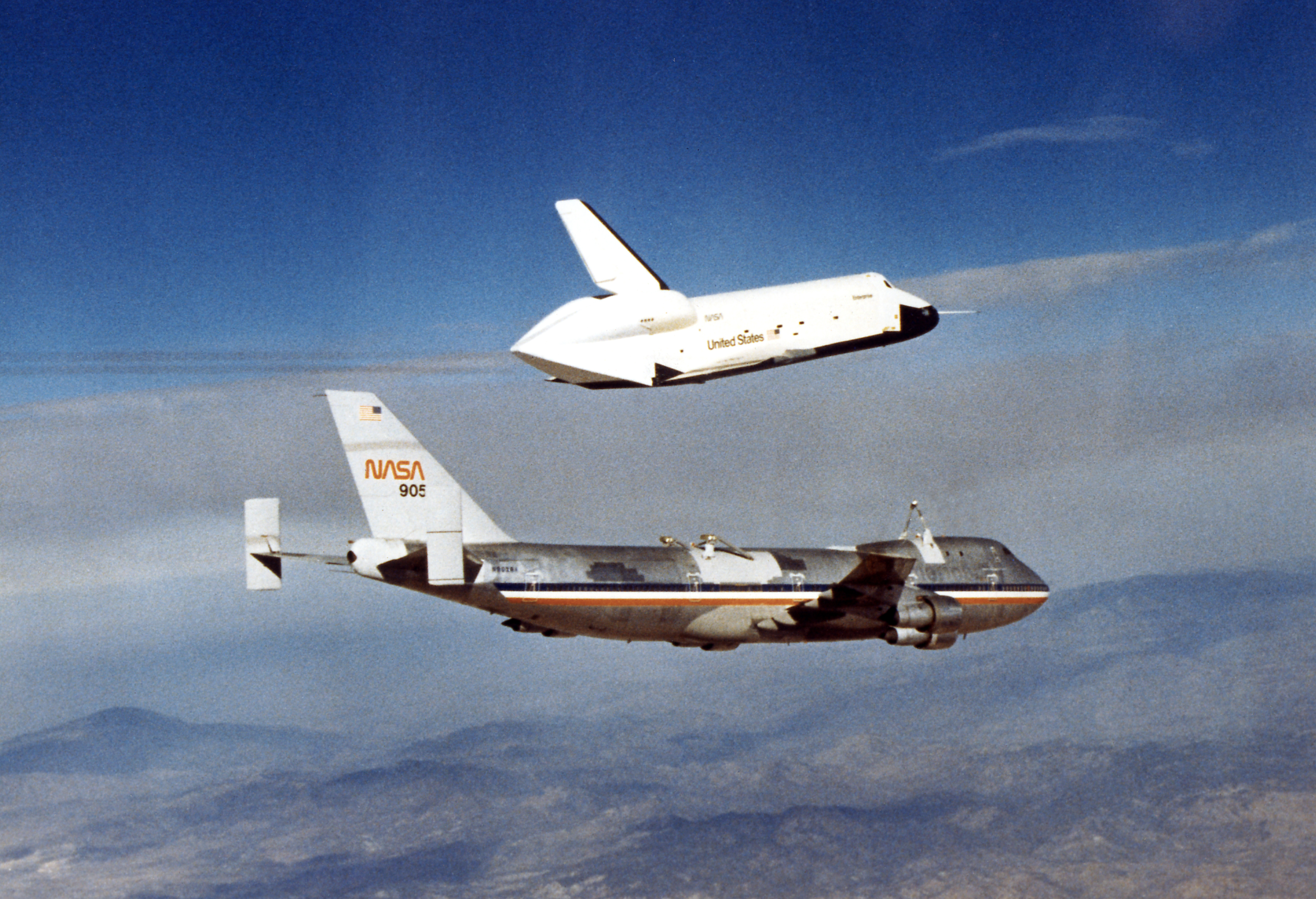
- Enterprise separates from the SCA on its first solo flight as part of ALT, August 12, 1977
- Operator: NASA

Spacecraft properties
- Spacecraft: Space Shuttle Enterprise
- Spacecraft type: Space Shuttle

Crew
- Members: C. Gordon Fullerton; Fred Haise; Joe Engle; Richard Truly
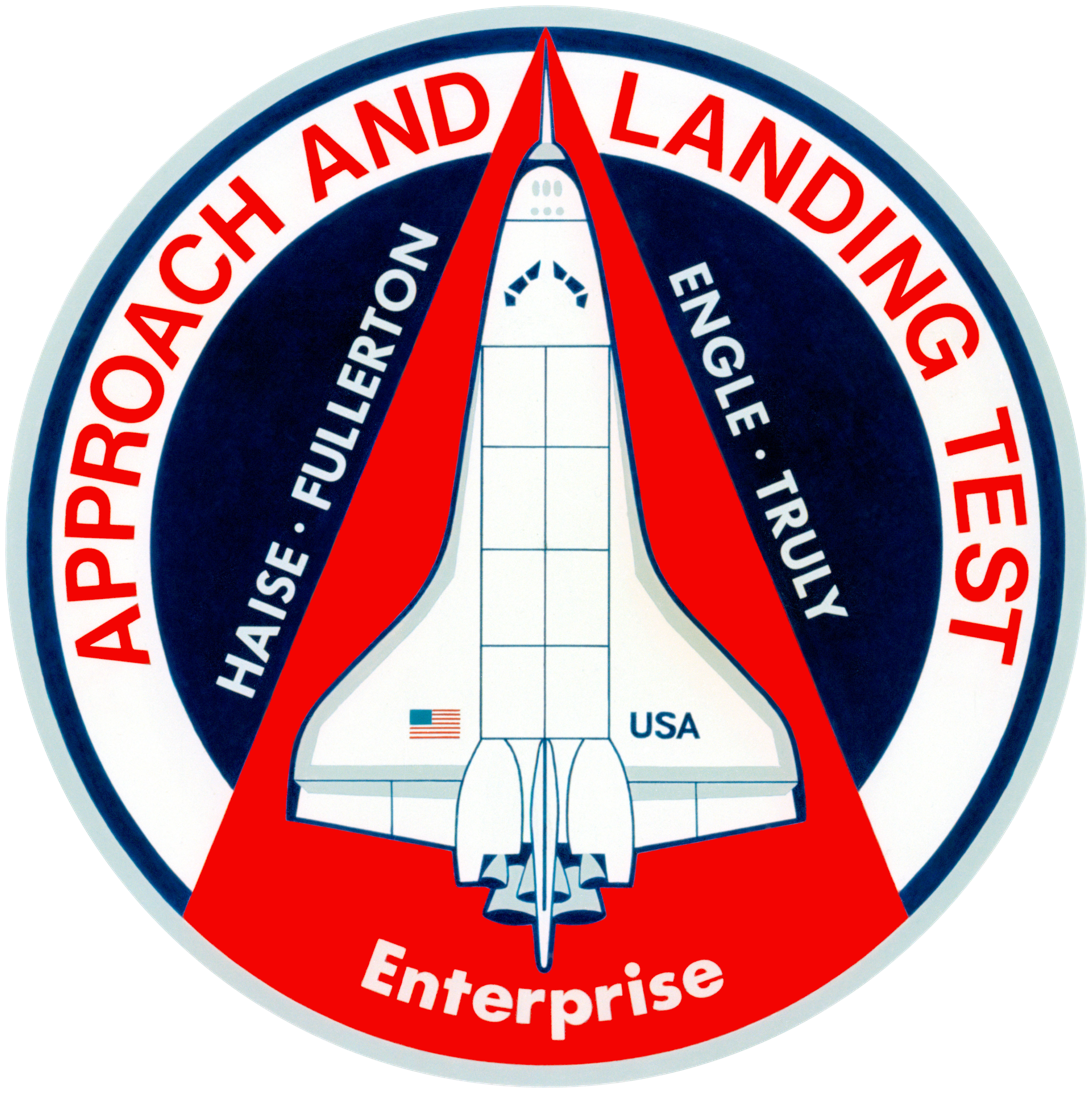
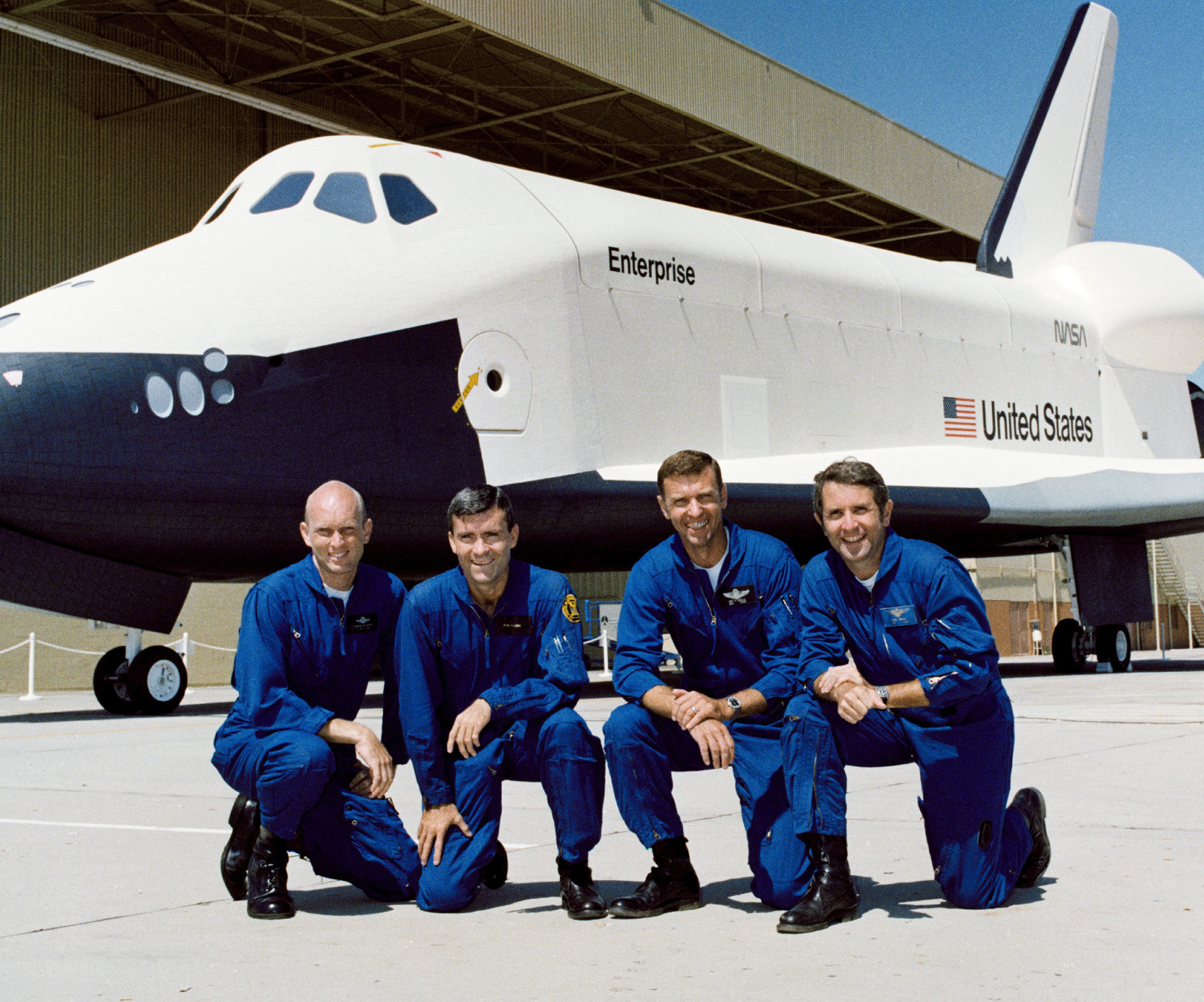
- Left to right: Fullerton, Haise, Engle and Truly

The Approach and Landing Tests were a series of sixteen taxi and flight trials of the prototype Space Shuttle Enterprise that took place between February and October 1977 to test the vehicle's flight characteristics. Of the sixteen taxi-tests and flights, eleven saw Enterprise remain mated to the Shuttle Carrier Aircraft (SCA), while the final five had the shuttle separate from the SCA, with the on-board crew flying and landing the spacecraft.

== Background ==
The Space Shuttle program originated in the late 1960s as an attempt to reduce the cost of spaceflight by introducing a reusable spacecraft. The final agreed design would feature a reusable spaceplane, a disposable external tank and reusable solid-fuel rocket boosters. The contract to build the spaceplane, which eventually came to be known as the "orbiter", was awarded to North American Rockwell (later Rockwell International), with the first complete orbiter rolled out in 1976. Originally planned to be named Constitution (due to its completion being in the year of the United States Bicentennial), a letter-writing campaign by Star Trek fans persuaded President Gerald Ford to change the name of the prototype to Enterprise. It was unveiled to the public on September 17, 1976, with several members of the Star Trek cast in attendance.

== Test program ==
Upon the orbiter's entry into service, NASA began an extensive program of tests using Enterprise to ensure all of the systems it had put in place for the Shuttle program functioned as designed. These tests would encompass not only the flight tests planned to test the flight characteristics of the orbiter, but also ground-based testing of the launch pad systems and procedures. In January 1977, Enterprise was taken by road from the Rockwell plant at Palmdale, California, to the Dryden Flight Research Center at Edwards Air Force Base to begin the flight test phase of the program, which had been christened by NASA as the Approach and Landing Tests (ALT).

== Crews ==
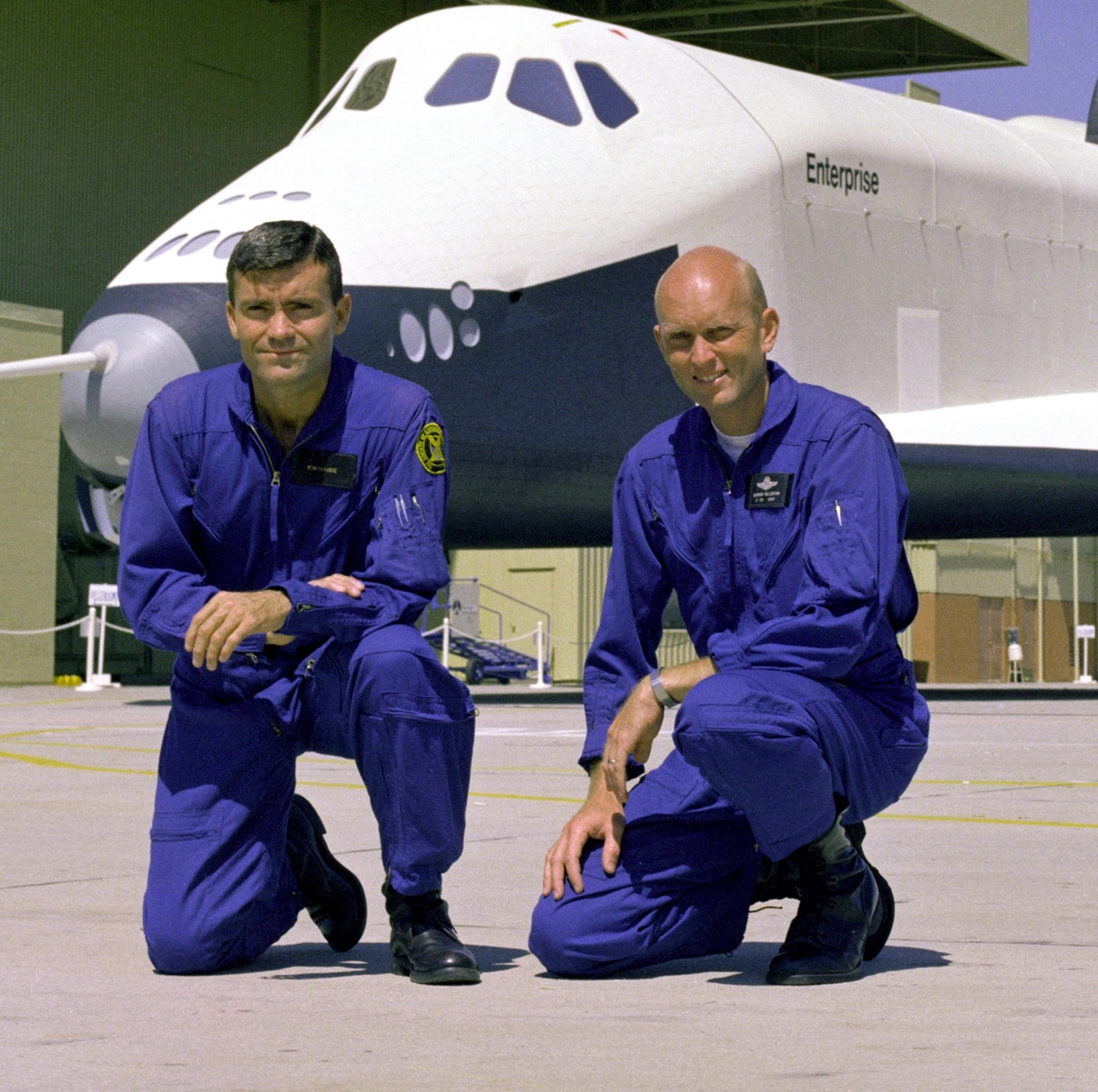
Crew 1: Haise and Fullerton

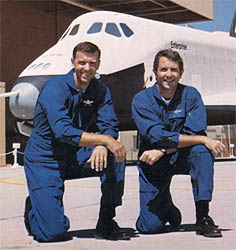
Crew 2: Engle and Truly

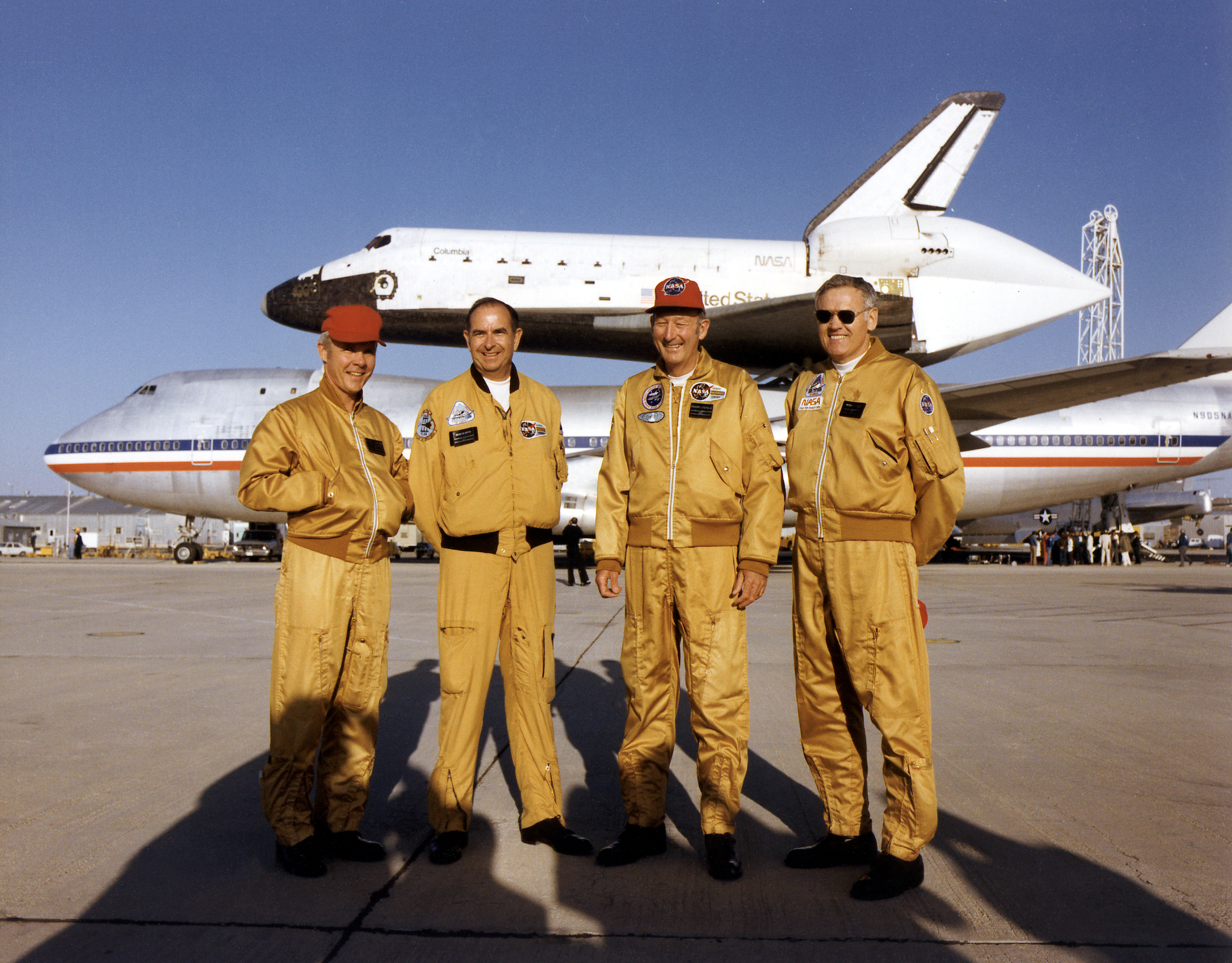
Shuttle carrier aircraft crew. From left to right: McMurtry, Horton, Fulton, and Young. Not pictured: Alvarez and Guidry.

The program lasted from February until October 1977, with a pair of two-man crews assigned to the orbiter:

=== Orbiter crew 1 ===
Position	Astronaut
Commander	Fred W. Haise, Jr.
Pilot	C. Gordon Fullerton

Haise had previously flown as the Lunar Module pilot of Apollo 13, and was named as the commander of the original STS-2 mission. (Note: Haise was named the commander of the original STS-2 mission, with Jack Lousma as the pilot, which was scheduled for launch in July 1979, and was to carry the Teleoperator Retrieval System intended to boost the Skylab space station into a higher orbit. Due to the delays in getting the system operational, this mission was scrubbed, and Haise left NASA in June 1979.) Fullerton later flew as the pilot of STS-3 and commanded STS-51-F.

=== Orbiter crew 2 ===
Position	Astronaut
Commander	Joe H. Engle
Pilot	Richard H. Truly

This crew later flew on STS-2. Engle was originally a USAF pilot on the X-15, and had already gained Astronaut wings by the time he joined NASA. He flew his second Shuttle mission on STS-51-I. (Note: Engle had been scheduled to fly as Lunar Module Pilot of Apollo 17, but was bumped from the flight in favor of Harrison Schmitt; Schmitt, a trained geologist, had been scheduled to fly on Apollo 18, but this mission was cancelled due to budget cuts in September 1970. As a result of pressure from the scientific community to have a trained scientist go to the Moon, Engle was removed from the crew of Apollo 17 to be replaced by Schmitt) Truly flew his second Shuttle mission as commander of STS-8.

=== Shuttle carrier aircraft crew ===
In addition to the two assigned Shuttle crews, who would alternate crewing the orbiter, a flight crew was attached to the Boeing 747 Shuttle Carrier Aircraft (SCA) for the entire program. This consisted of a captain and first officer, plus a pair of flight engineers:

Position	Crew member
Captain	Fitzhugh L. Fulton, Jr.
First officer	Thomas C. McMurtry
Flight engineer	Louis E. Guidry, Jr.
Flight engineer	Victor W. Horton
Flight engineer	Vincent A. Alvarez
Flight engineer	William R. Young

== ALT ==
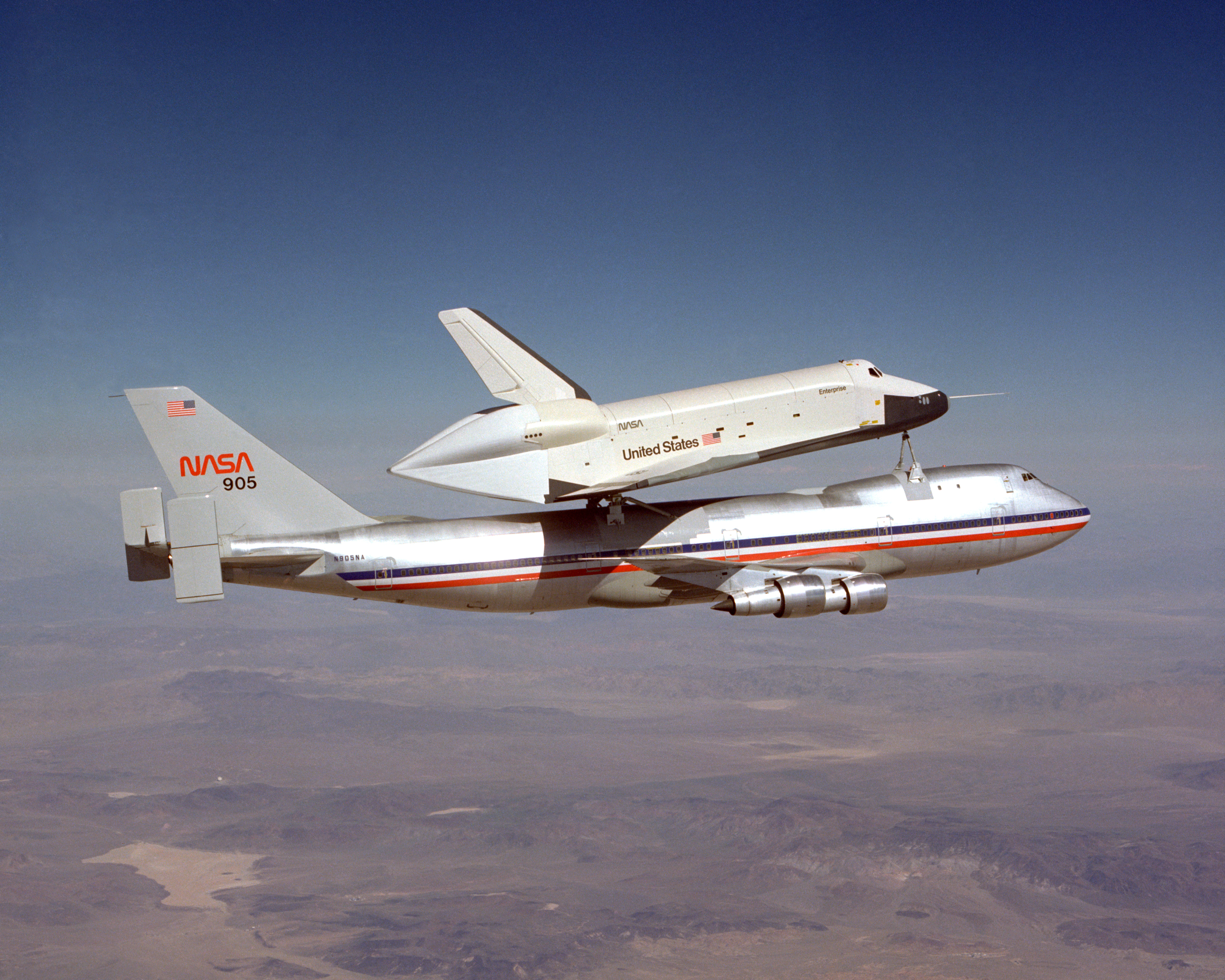
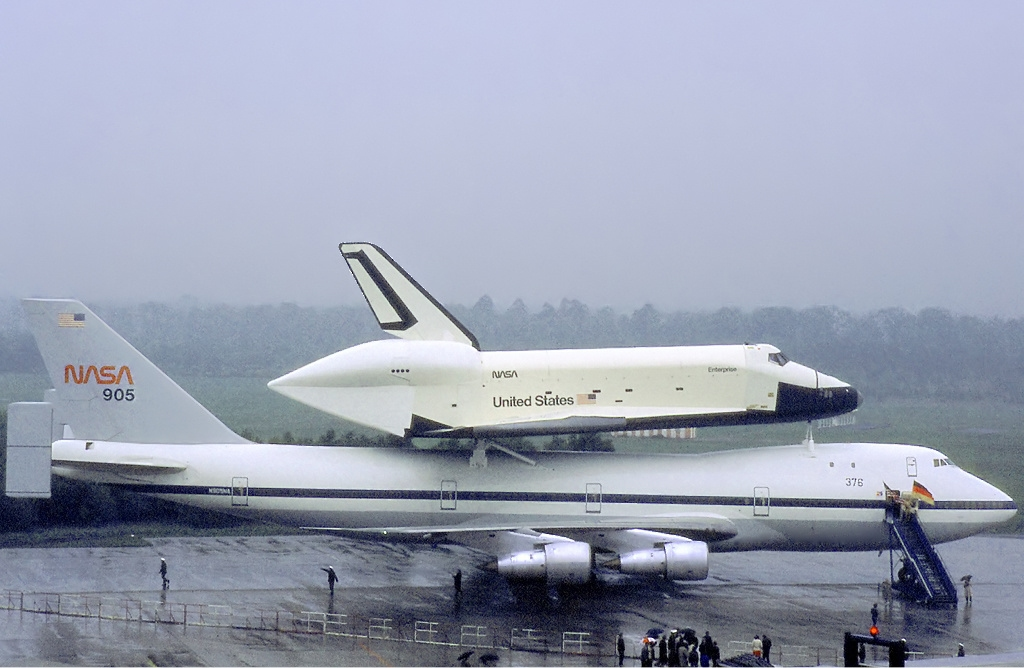
Enterprise mated to the Shuttle Carrier Aircraft for one of the ALT captive flights (top) and a ferry flight (bottom). Note the higher nose position during the captive flight

The ALT program was divided into three phases.

=== Taxi-test ===
The "taxi-test" phase sought to verify the taxiing characteristics of the SCA while carrying the orbiter. On February 15, 1977, the SCA performed three taxi tests at Edwards Air Force Base, hauling the uncrewed, unpowered orbiter around on the ground.

=== Captive flights ===
The captive flight phase of ALT served as a test of the SCA's flying characteristics while mated to the orbiter, and an initial test of the orbiter systems in flight. It was divided into two sub-phases:

==== Captive – inert ====
Five captive-inert flights tested the flight and handling characteristics of the aircraft while it was mated to the orbiter. No tests were performed aboard the unpowered, uncrewed orbiter.

==== Captive – active ====
The captive-active flights were intended to determine the optimum profile required for Enterprise to separate from the SCA during the orbiter's free flights. These were also intended to refine and test the orbiter crew procedures and to ensure the operational readiness of the orbiter's systems. For these three flights, although Enterprise remained mated to the SCA, it was powered and crewed.

=== Free-flight ===
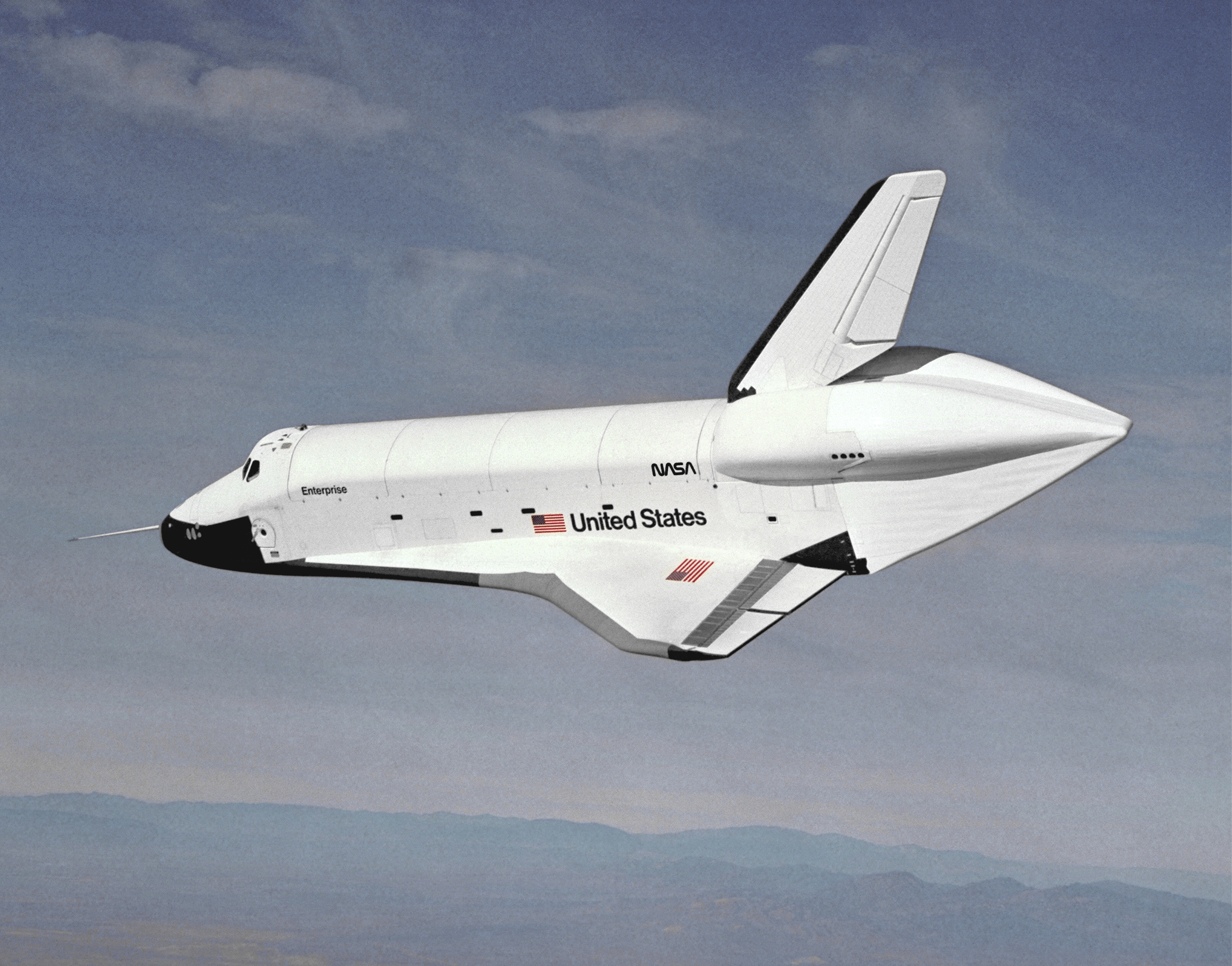
Enterprise on its approach during the second free-flight

The final phase of flight testing involved free flights. The SCA flew Enterprise to a launch altitude, then released it to glide to a landing at Edwards AFB. The intention of these flights was to test the flight characteristics of the orbiter itself, on a typical approach and landing profile from orbit.

For the approach and landing tests, a nose strut longer than those employed in later ferry flights increased the shuttle's angle of attack relative to the 747. Before the orbiter was released, the 747 engines were set to full power and the paired aircraft entered a shallow dive. Increased air speed combined with the shuttle's higher angle of attack generated enough differential lift so that the shuttle was effectively supporting the 747. Load cells on the three attachment points monitored the forces, informing the crew when the attachments were in sufficient tension. The mechanical connection between the two aircraft was then severed by explosive bolts and the shuttle essentially dropped the 747. The shuttle crew reported feeling an upward lurch on separation. The two aircraft then turned in opposite directions to maximize separation. The shuttle executed some more turns to evaluate its handling and glided to a landing.

There were a total of five free-flights between August and October; the first three saw Enterprise remain fitted with its aerodynamic tail cone, intended to reduce drag when mounted on the SCA during flight. The final two had the tail cone removed, with the orbiter in its full operational configuration, with dummy main engines and OMS pods. Enterprise used an air data probe mounted on its nose for these flights. These five flights were to be the only time Enterprise flew alone.

After flying missions on Columbia (STS-2) and Discovery (STS-51-I), Engle reported that the flight and handling characteristics of the operational orbiters were similar to those of Enterprise, except that he had to fly a steeper profile with the prototype, as it was much lighter than the operational spacecraft.

=== Ferry flights ===
After the free-flight tests, Enterprise was prepared for ferry flight tests, which were intended to ensure that the SCA/orbiter configuration was viable for flights of the duration between landing and launch sites.

== List of ALT flights ==
Enterprise separates from the SCA during Free Flight #4, the first with the orbiter in its flight configuration without the tailcone

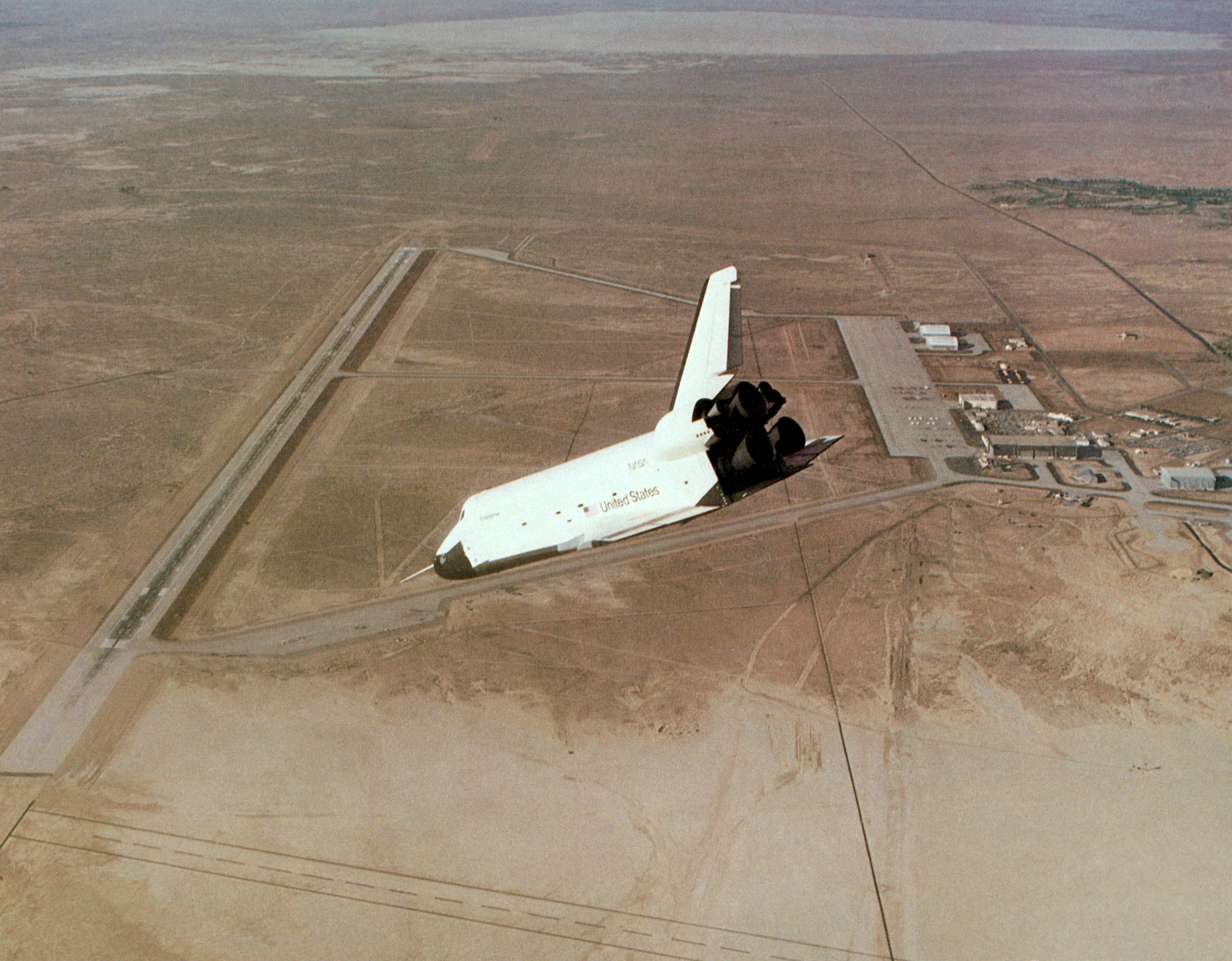
Enterprise approaches Edwards during Free Flight #4

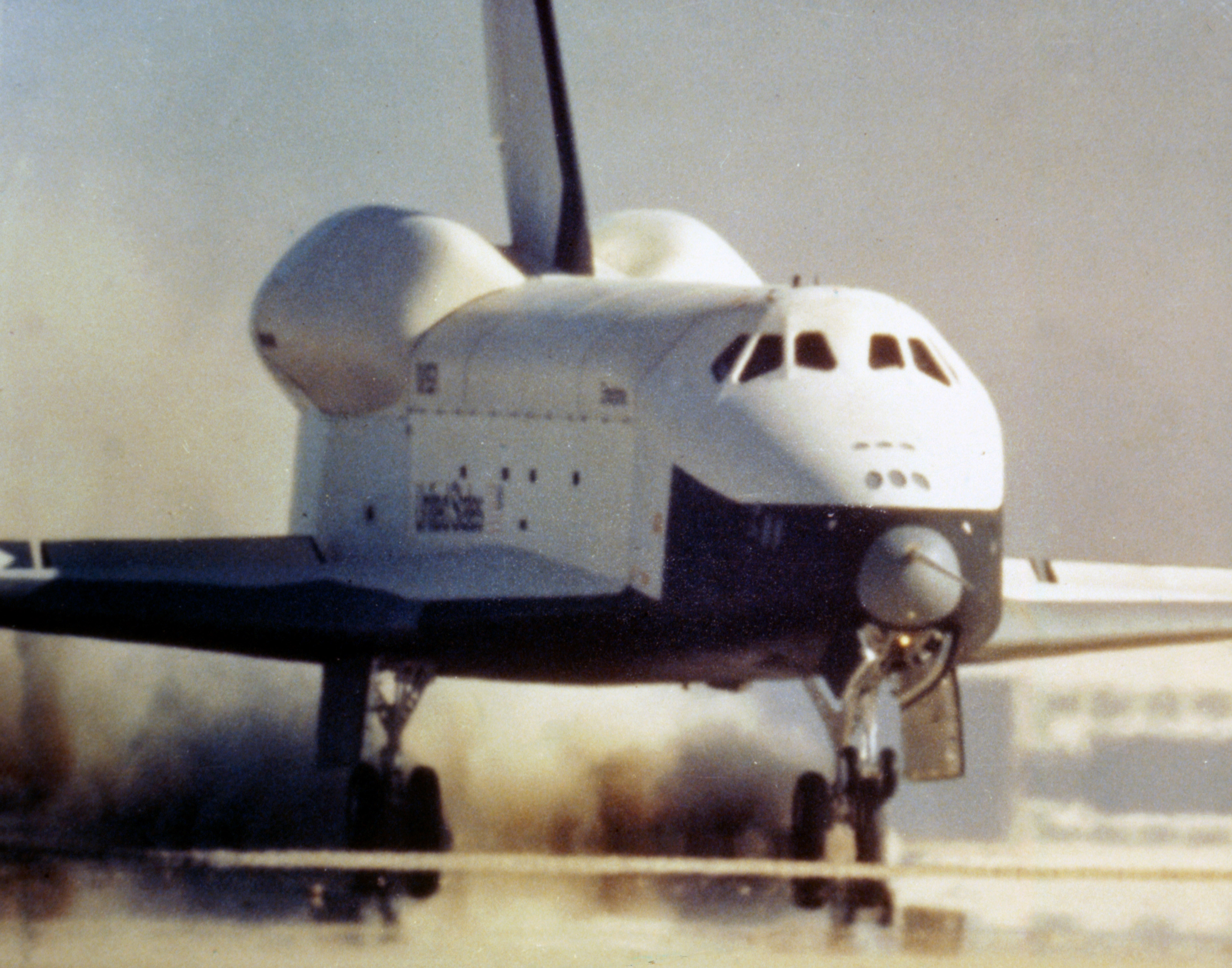
Enterprise lands at the conclusion of Free Flight #2

Mission	Test flight	Date	Speed	Altitude	Shuttle crew	SCA crew	Duration		Comment
Mission	Test flight	Date	Speed	Altitude	Shuttle crew	SCA crew	Full flight	Shuttle flight	Comment
ALT-1	Taxi test #1	February 15, 1977	89 mph (143 km/h)	Taxi	None	Fulton, McMurtry, Horton, Guidry	Taxi		Concrete runway, tailcone on
ALT-2	Taxi test #2	February 15, 1977	140 mph (225 km/h)	Taxi	None	Fulton, McMurtry, Horton, Guidry	Taxi		Concrete runway, tailcone on
ALT-3	Taxi test #3	February 15, 1977	157 mph (253 km/h)	Taxi	None	Fulton, McMurtry, Horton, Guidry	Taxi		Concrete runway, tailcone on
ALT-4	Captive-inert flight #1	February 18, 1977	287 mph (462 km/h)	16,000 ft 4,877 m	None	Fulton, McMurtry, Horton, Guidry	2 h 5 min	N/A	Tailcone on, landed with 747
ALT-5	Captive-inert flight #2	February 22, 1977	328 mph (528 km/h)	22,600 ft 6,888 m	None	Fulton, McMurtry, Horton, Guidry	3 h 13 min	N/A	Tailcone on, landed with 747
ALT-6	Captive-inert flight #3	February 25, 1977	425 mph (684 km/h)	26,600 ft 8,108 m	None	Fulton, McMurtry, Horton, Guidry	2 h 28 min	N/A	Tailcone on, landed with 747
ALT-7	Captive-inert flight #4	February 28, 1977	425 mph (684 km/h)	28,565 ft 8,707 m	None	Fulton, McMurtry, Horton, Guidry	2 h 11 min	N/A	Tailcone on, landed with 747
ALT-8	Captive-inert flight #5	March 2, 1977	474 mph (763 km/h)	30,000 ft 9,144 m	None	Fulton, McMurtry, Horton, Guidry	1 h 39 min	N/A	Tailcone on, landed with 747
ALT-9	Captive-active flight #1A	June 18, 1977	208 mph (335 km/h)	14,970 ft 4,563 m	Haise, Fullerton	Fulton, McMurtry, Horton, Guidry	55 min 46 s	N/A	Tailcone on, landed with 747
ALT-10	Captive-active flight #1	June 28, 1977	310 mph (499 km/h)	22,030 ft 6,715 m	Engle, Truly	Fulton, McMurtry, Guidry, Young	62 min 0 s	N/A	Tailcone on, landed with 747
ALT-11	Captive-active flight #3	July 26, 1977	311 mph (501 km/h)	30,292 ft 9,233 m	Haise, Fullerton	Fulton, McMurtry, Horton, Alvarez	59 min 53 s	N/A	Tailcone on, landed with 747
ALT-12	Free flight #1	August 12, 1977	310 mph (499 km/h)	24,100 ft 7,346 m	Haise, Fullerton	Fulton, McMurtry, Horton, Guidry	53 min 51 s	5 min 21 s	Tailcone on, lakebed landing
ALT-13	Free flight #2	September 13, 1977	310 mph (499 km/h)	26,000 ft 7,925 m	Engle, Truly	Fulton, McMurtry, Horton, Guidry	54 min 55s	5 min 28 s	Tailcone on, lakebed landing
ALT-14	Free flight #3	September 23, 1977	290 mph (467 km/h)	24,700 ft 7,529 m	Haise, Fullerton	Fulton, McMurtry, Horton, Guidry	51 min 12 s	5 min 34 s	Tailcone on, lakebed landing
ALT-15	Free flight #4	October 12, 1977	278 mph (447 km/h)	22,400 ft 6,828 m	Engle, Truly	Fulton, McMurtry, Horton, Guidry	67 min 48 s	2 min 34 s	Tailcone off, lakebed landing
ALT-16	Free flight #5	October 26, 1977	283 mph (455 km/h)	19,000 ft 5,791 m	Haise, Fullerton	Fulton, McMurtry, Horton, Guidry	54 min 42 s	2 min 1 s	Tailcone off, runway landing

== After ALT ==
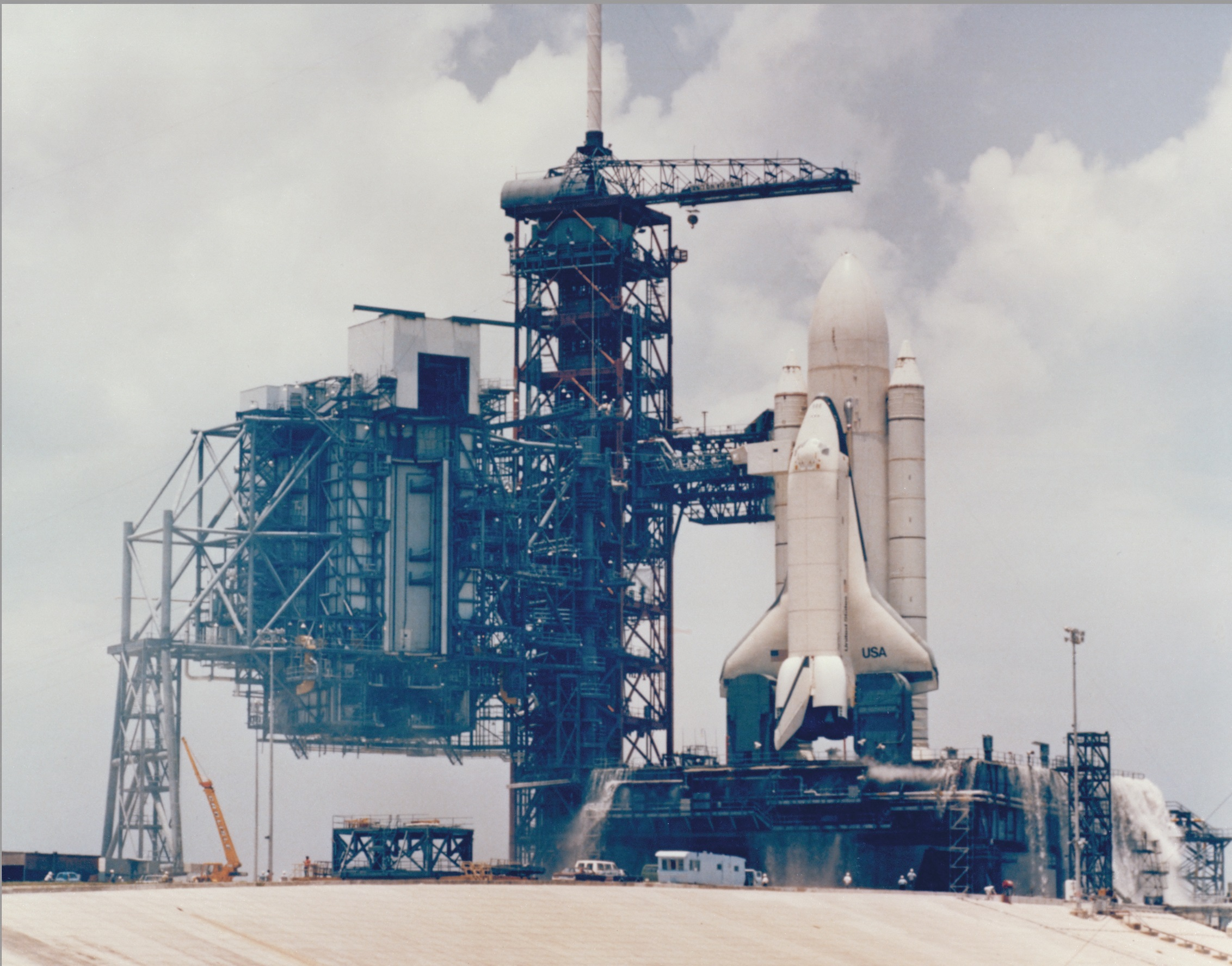
Enterprise mated to external tank and dummy SRBs stands on Kennedy Space Center Pad 39A during fit check tests 20 months before STS-1.

After the flight test program, Enterprise was taken for testing with the external tank and SRBs in full-up launch configuration, to test both the structural responses of the "stack" itself and the launch procedures before the entry into service and first launch of the first operational orbiter. Enterprise was taken to the Dynamic Structural Test Facility at the Marshall Space Flight Center in Huntsville, Alabama, where the complete stack was subjected to vertical ground vibration tests, assessing the structural responses to a number of scenarios. Then the orbiter was flown to the Kennedy Space Center in Florida, to test the procedures of assembling the stack in the Vehicle Assembly Building, transporting it from the VAB to the launch pad, and to fit-check the facilities and procedures at LC-39 to be used in launching the Shuttle.

== Video gallery ==
Space Shuttle Enterprise 747 takeoff

Space Shuttle Enterprise 747 separation

Space Shuttle Enterprise landing
