= Fred Haise =

American astronaut (born 1933)

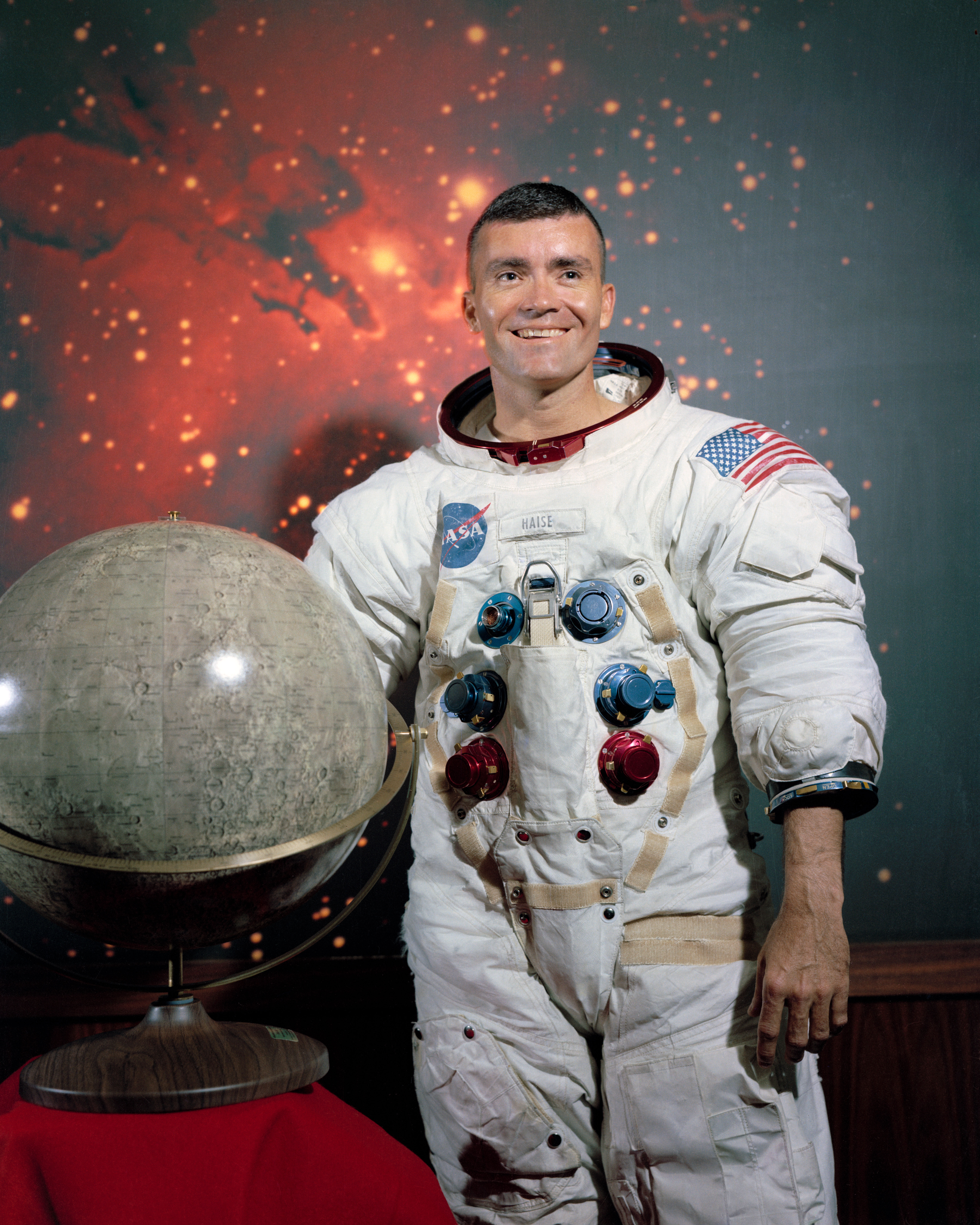
- Haise in 1969
- Born: Fred Wallace Haise Jr. November 14, 1933 (age 93); Biloxi, Mississippi, U.S.
- Education: Perkinston Junior College (AA); University of Oklahoma (BS)
- Spouse(s): Mary Griffin Grant (m. 1954; div. 1978) Frances Price (m. 1979; died 2022)
- Children: 4
- Awards: Presidential Medal of Freedom; NASA Distinguished Service Medal
- Space career

NASA astronaut
- Rank: Captain, U.S. Marine Corps (1954–1957); Captain, U.S. Air Force (1957–1963)
- Time in space: 5 days, 22 hours, 54 minutes
- Selection: NASA Group 5 (1966)
- Mission: Apollo 13; Approach and Landing Tests
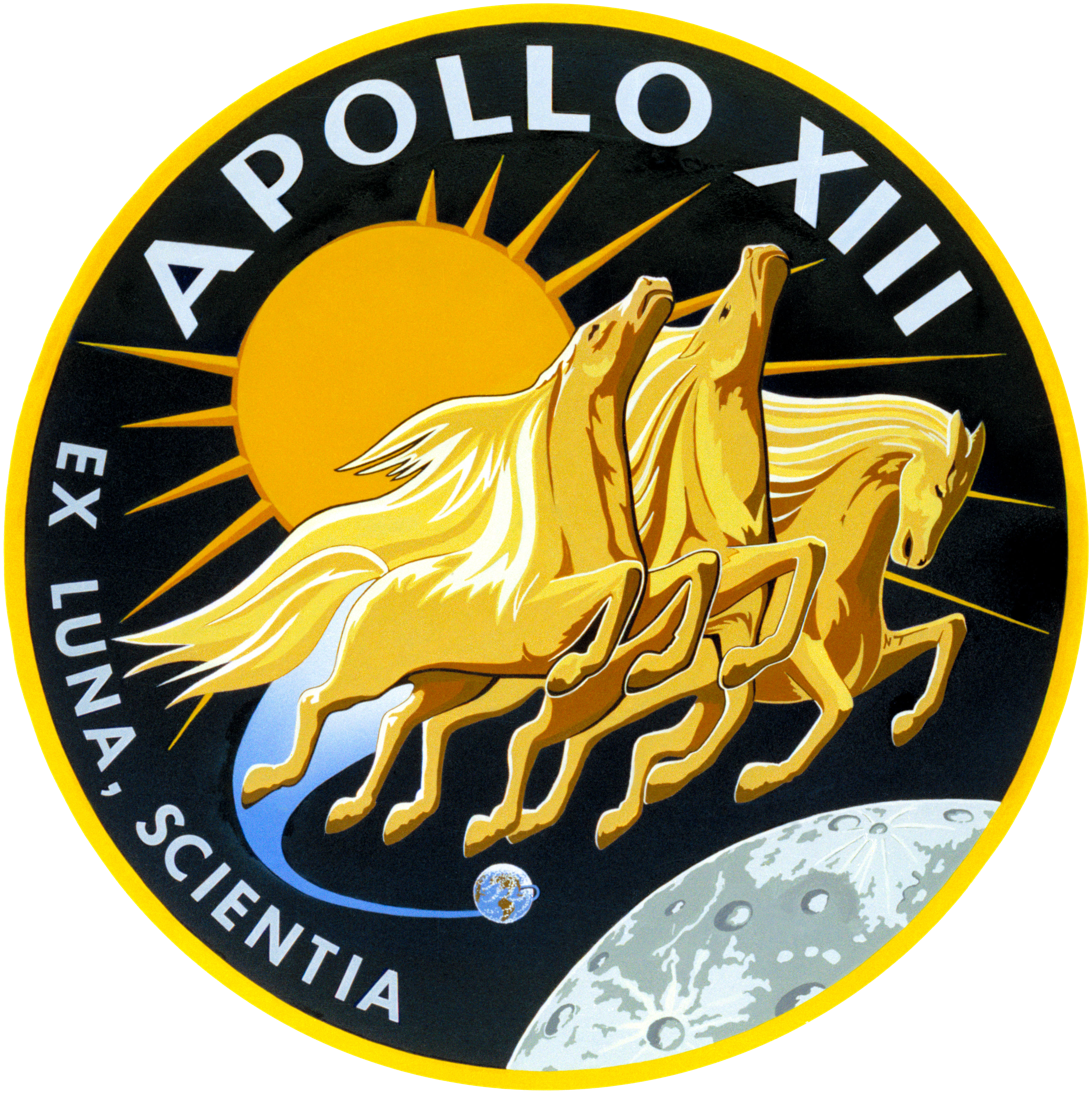
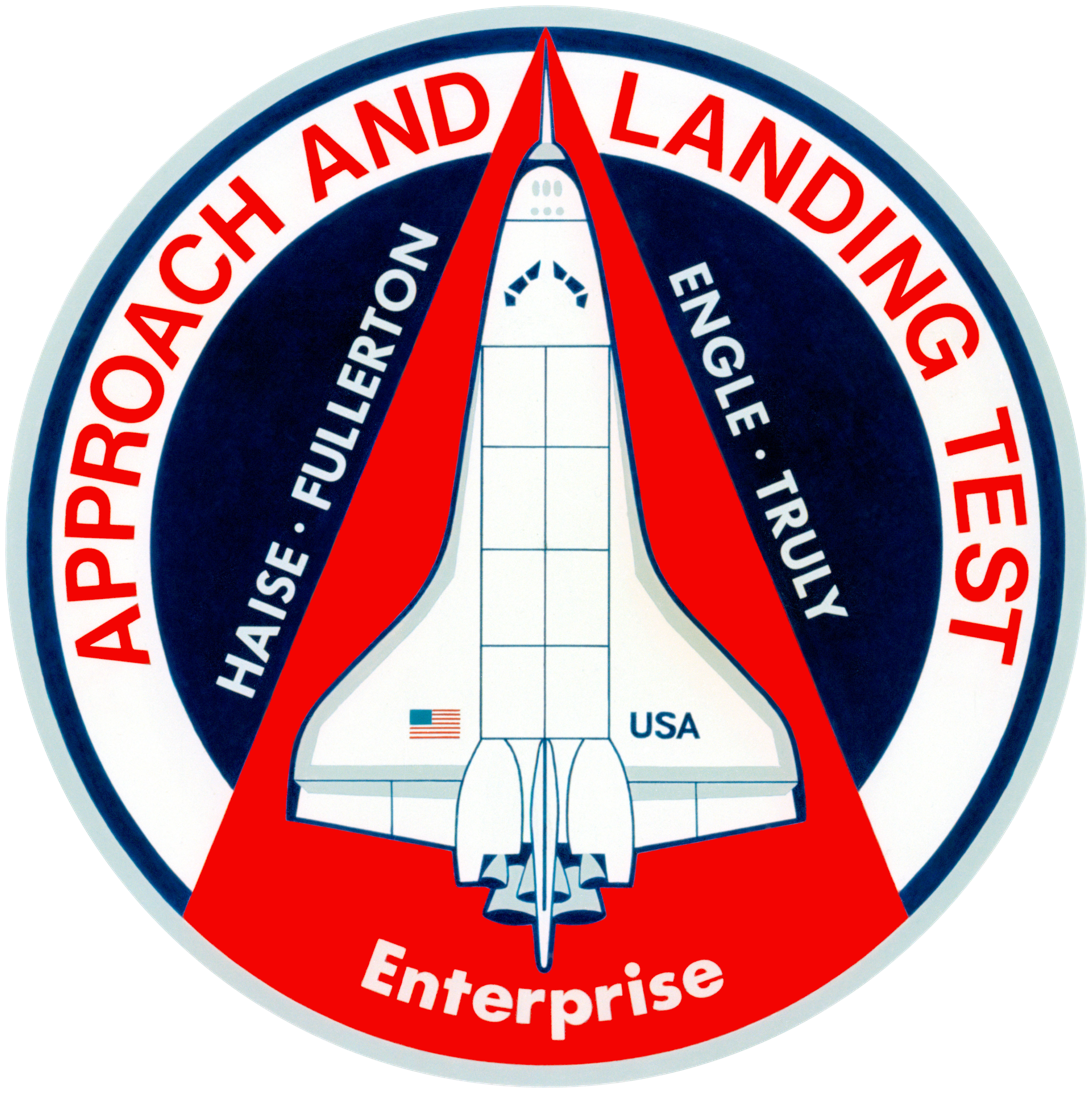
- Mission insignia
- Retired: June 29, 1979

Signature
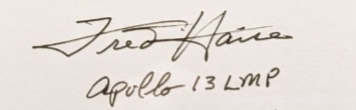

Fred Wallace Haise Jr. (/heɪz/ HAYZ; born November 14, 1933) is an American former NASA astronaut, engineer, fighter pilot with the U.S. Marine Corps and U.S. Air Force, and test pilot. He is one of the 24 Apollo astronauts to reach the Moon, having served as Lunar Module pilot on Apollo 13. He was to have been the sixth person to walk on the Moon, but the Apollo 13 landing was aborted en route. Haise flew five Space Shuttle Approach and Landing Tests in 1977. He retired from NASA in 1979. He is the last surviving crew member of Apollo 13 and the last surviving Apollo astronaut that reached the Moon without landing.

== Early life ==
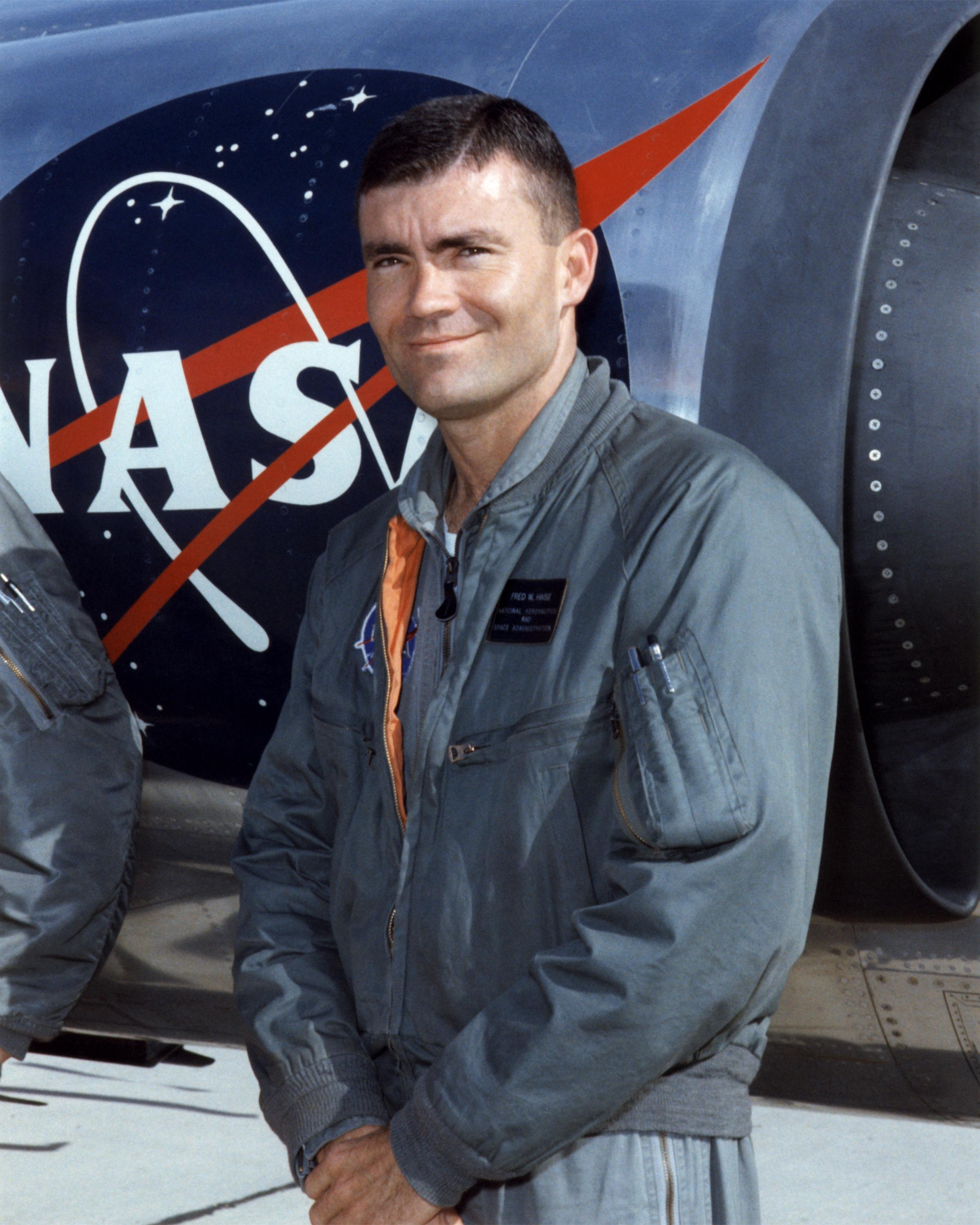
Haise in 1966

Fred Wallace Haise Jr. was born on November 14, 1933, and raised in Biloxi, Mississippi, to Fred Wallace Haise Sr. and Lucille (née Blacksher) Haise. He has a younger sister who was born in 1941. After the attack on Pearl Harbor on December 7, 1941, his father enlisted in the U.S. Navy at the age of 36, and the Haise family moved to Chicago. The family then moved to Key West, Florida, until his father's ship, YMS-84, deployed to the South Pacific, when the family moved back to Biloxi. He graduated from Biloxi High School in 1950. He attended Perkinston Junior College with a scholarship for journalism, and played on the baseball team. He graduated in 1952, and joined the Naval Aviation Cadet Program. He went to ground school at NAS Pensacola, and then moved to NAS Whiting Field in 1952. He trained in the SNJ and F6F Hellcat, and completed his flight training in 1954. He served as a fighter pilot in the U.S. Marine Corps, with VMF-533, then VMF-114, the F2H-4 Banshee and F9F-8 Cougar at MCAS Cherry Point, North Carolina, from March 1954 to September 1956. Haise also served as a tactics and all-weather flight instructor in the U.S. Navy Advanced Training Command at NAS Kingsville, Texas.

Haise has accumulated 9,300 hours flying time, including 6,200 hours in jets.

After his military service, Haise returned to school and graduated with a Bachelor of Science degree with honors in aeronautical engineering from the University of Oklahoma in 1959, concurrently serving for two years in the Oklahoma Air National Guard, as a fighter interceptor pilot with the 185th Fighter Interceptor Squadron, flying the F-86D. He then worked for the newly created National Aeronautics and Space Administration (NASA), first as a research pilot at the Lewis Research Center near Cleveland. His Air National Guard unit was called up during the Berlin Crisis of 1961 and he served ten months as a fighter pilot in the United States Air Force. He was a tactical fighter pilot and chief of the 164th Standardization-Evaluation Flight of the 164th Tactical Fighter Squadron at Mansfield Lahm Air National Guard Base, Ohio, flying the F-84F.

Haise completed post-graduate courses at the U.S. Air Force Aerospace Research Pilot School (Class 64A) at Edwards Air Force Base, California, in 1964, and attended the six-week Harvard Business School's Advanced Management Program in 1972.

== NASA career ==
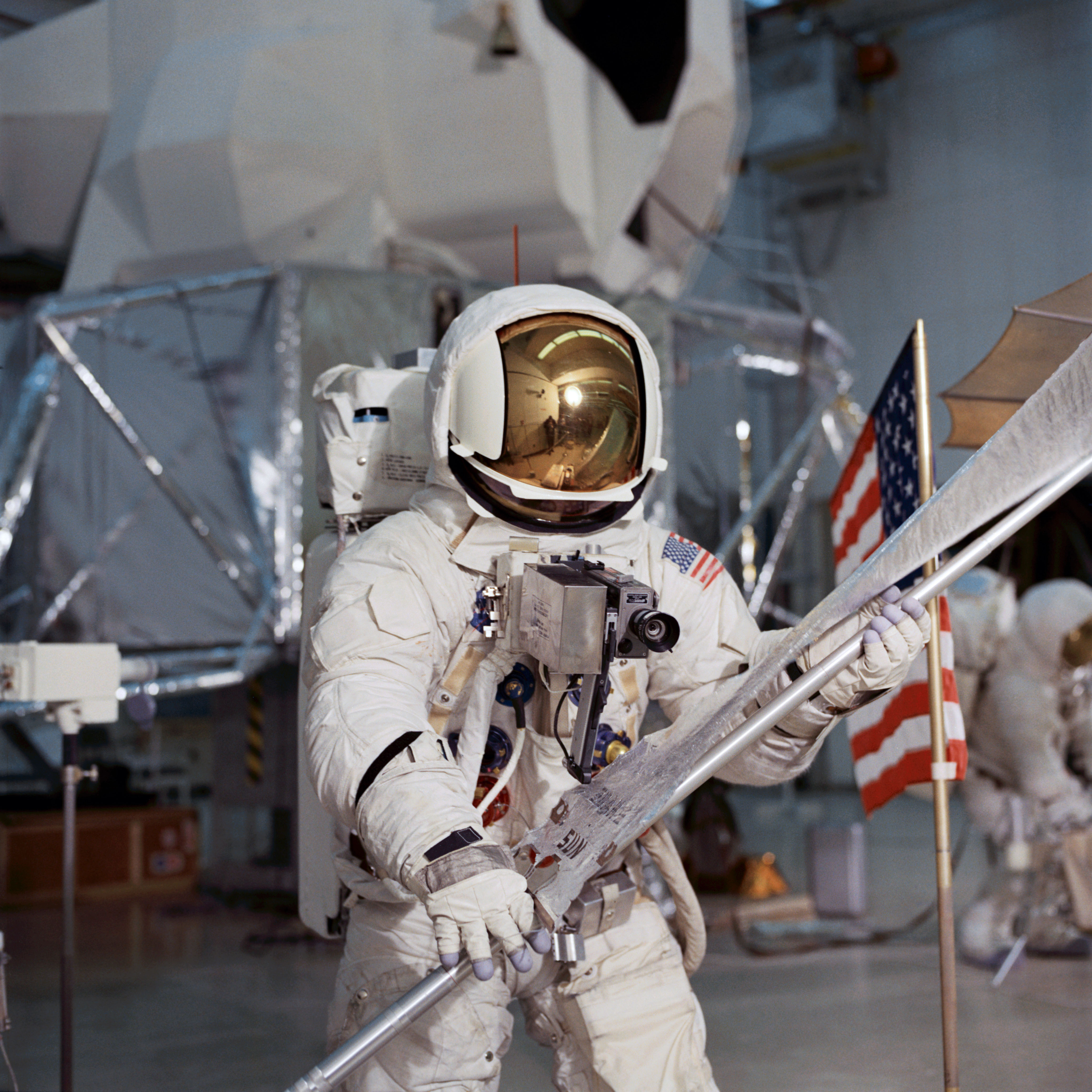
Haise practicing lunar EVA

In 1966, Haise was one of 19 astronauts selected for NASA Astronaut Group 5. He had already worked with NASA for several years as a civilian research pilot. He was the first astronaut in his group to be assigned to a mission, serving as backup Lunar Module Pilot for both Apollo 8 and Apollo 11.

=== Apollo 13 ===
It only seems interesting to the public if it's the first exploration of another planetary body, or if you're having a problem.

— Fred Haise

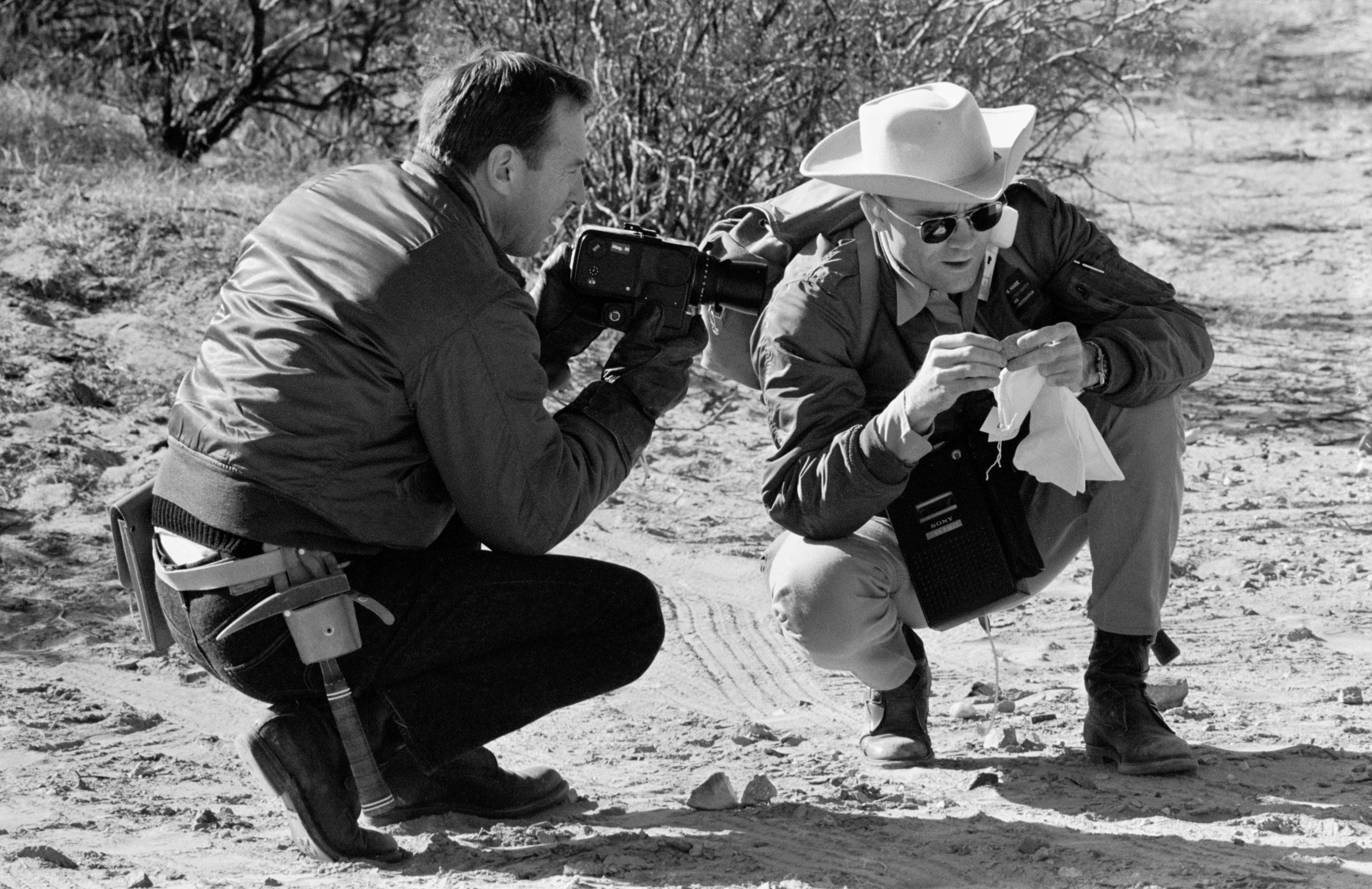
Haise with Jim Lovell during geology training, February 24, 1969

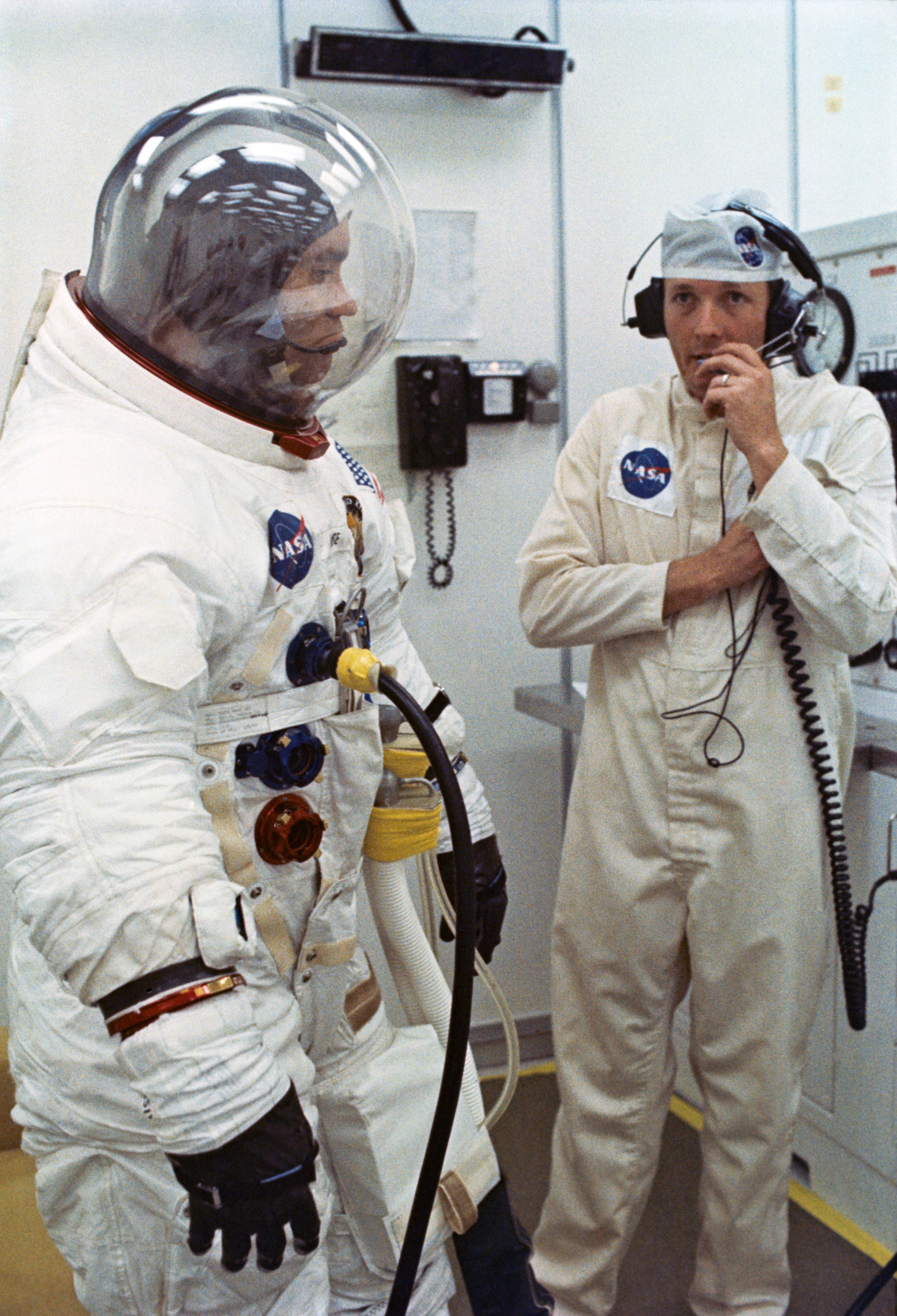
Haise suiting up for the Apollo 13 mission, April 11, 1970

According to the rotation of crews during Apollo, Haise was originally assigned as Lunar Module Pilot for Apollo 14, but his crew was switched to Apollo 13 so that Alan Shepard could have more training time. He flew as Lunar Module Pilot on the aborted Apollo 13 lunar mission in 1970. Due to the distance between the Earth and Moon during the mission, Haise, Jim Lovell, and Jack Swigert set the record for the farthest distance from the Earth ever traveled by human beings, which stood until the Artemis II lunar flyby in 2026. Haise and Jack Swigert were the first astronauts from Group 5 to fly in space. During this flight, Haise developed a urinary tract infection and later kidney infections. These caused him to be in pain for most of the trip.

Haise was slated to become the sixth human to walk on the Moon during Apollo 13 behind Lovell, who was to be fifth. Alan Shepard and Edgar Mitchell eventually became the fifth and sixth respectively on Apollo 14, which completed Apollo 13's mission to the Fra Mauro formation.

Haise served as backup commander for Apollo 16. Though there was no formal selection, Haise was prospectively slated to command Apollo 19 with William R. Pogue as Command Module Pilot and Gerald P. Carr as Lunar Module Pilot. However, the mission was canceled in 1970 due to budget cuts.

=== Space Shuttle approach and landing tests ===
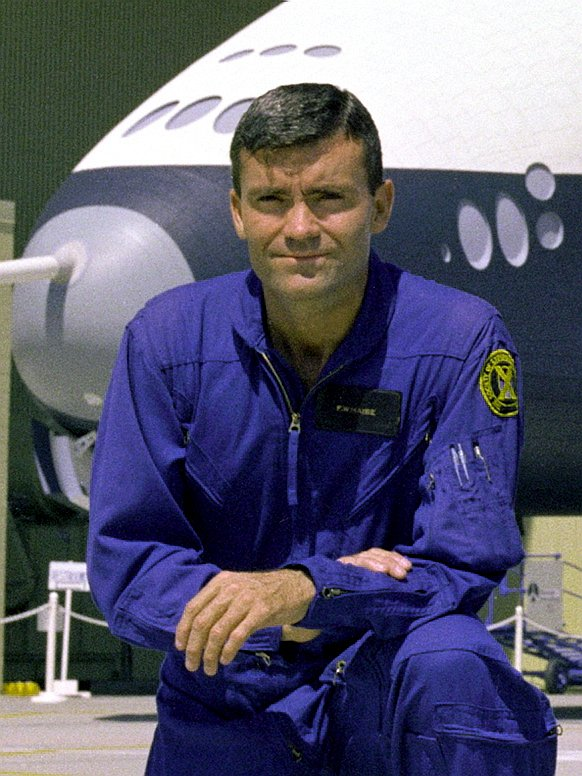
Haise in front of the Space Shuttle Enterprise in 1976

After completing his backup assignment on Apollo 16, Haise moved to the Space Shuttle program. In 1977, he participated in the program's Approach and Landing Tests (ALT) at Edwards Air Force Base. Along with C. Gordon Fullerton as pilot, Haise as commander piloted the Space Shuttle Enterprise in free flight to three landings after being released from the Shuttle Carrier Aircraft. The tests verified the shuttle's flight characteristics, an important step toward the success of the program.

Haise was assigned to command STS-2A, with Jack R. Lousma as pilot, the second Space Shuttle mission, which would have delivered the Teleoperator Retrieval System that would have boosted Skylab to a higher orbit, preserving it for future use. Delays in the Shuttle program development as well as an unexpected increase in Skylab's orbital decay led to the mission being canceled. Skylab was destroyed upon entering the Earth's atmosphere in July 1979, while the Space Shuttle did not launch until April 1981.

In June 1979, Haise left NASA to become a test pilot and executive with Grumman Aerospace Corporation, where he remained until retiring in 1996. He was the only one of the four astronauts who conducted the Enterprise landing tests not to fly in space on the Shuttle.

== Personal life ==
Haise has four children with his first wife Mary Griffin Grant, whom he married on June 4, 1954, and divorced on July 21, 1978. He married Frances Patt Price, on January 9, 1979. On February 7, 2022, Frances died.

On August 22, 1973, Haise was piloting a Convair BT-13 belonging to the Commemorative Air Force that had been converted to look like an Aichi D3A "Val" torpedo bomber for the 1970 film Tora! Tora! Tora!. While attempting a landing go around at Scholes Field in Galveston, Texas, an undetermined power plant failure led to a crash landing. Haise suffered second‐degree burns over 50 percent of his body in the post crash fire.

In 2022, Haise published his autobiography, Never Panic Early, about his life and experiences in the Apollo program.

== Organizations ==
Haise is a fellow of the American Astronautical Society (AAS) and the Society of Experimental Test Pilots (SETP); member, Tau Beta Pi, Sigma Gamma Tau, and Phi Theta Kappa; and honorary member, National WWII Glider Pilots Association.

== Awards and honors ==
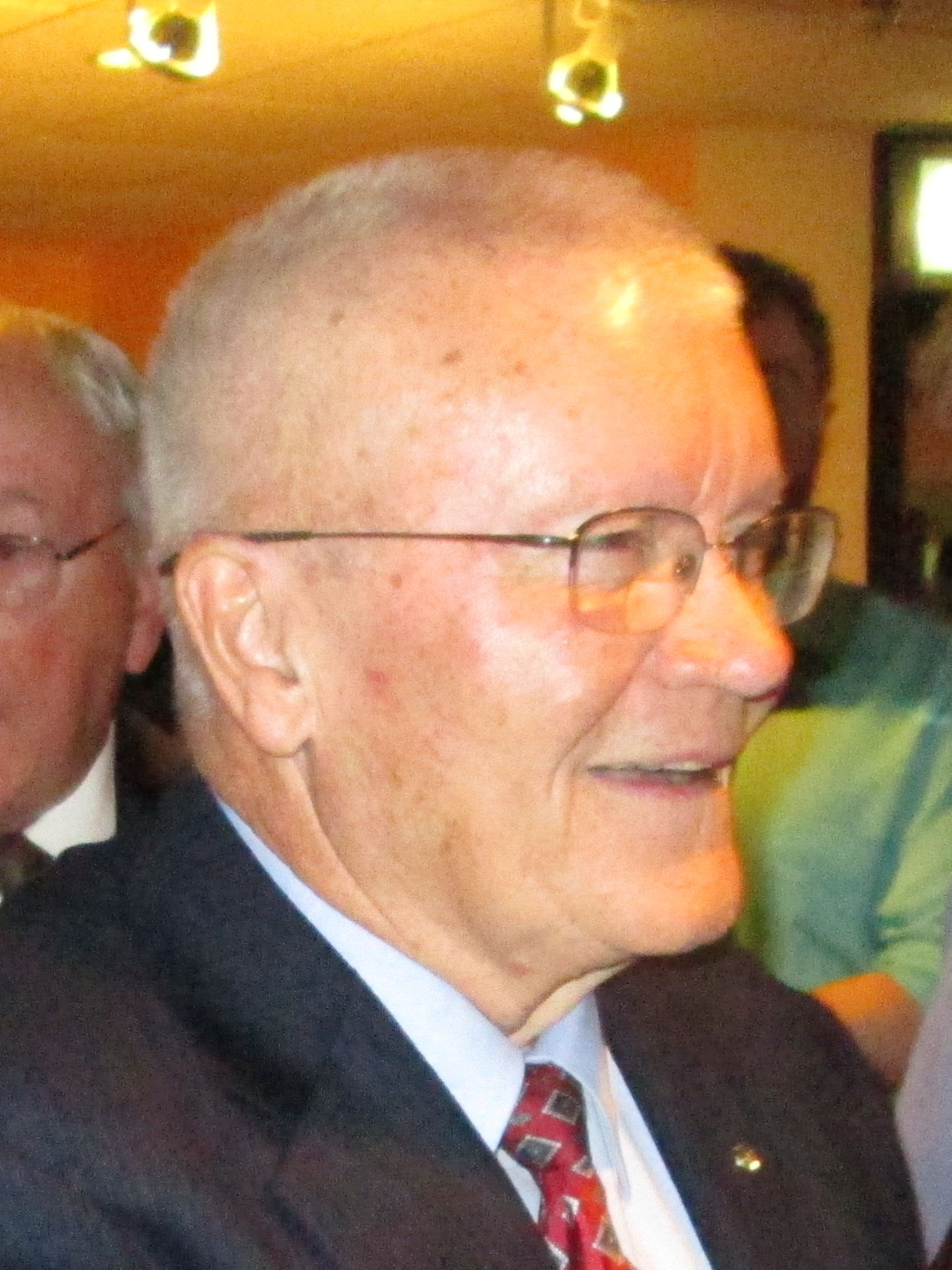
Haise in 2015

Haise's other awards include the American Institute of Aeronautics and Astronautics (AIAA) Haley Astronautics Award for 1971; the American Astronautical Society Flight Achievement Awards for 1970 and 1977; the City of New York Gold Medal in 1970; the City of Houston Medal for Valor in 1970; the Jeff Davis Award (1970); the Mississippi Distinguished Civilian Service Medal (1970); the American Defense Ribbon; the SETP's Ray E. Tenhoff Award for 1966; the A. B. Honts Trophy as the outstanding graduate of Class 64A from the Aerospace Research Pilot School in 1964; an honorary doctor of science degree from Western Michigan University (1970); the JSC Special Achievement Award (1978); the Soaring Society of America's Certificate of Achievement Award (1978); the General Thomas D. White USAF Space Trophy for 1977; the SETP's Iven C. Kincheloe Award (1978); and the Air Force Association's David C. Schilling Award (1978).

Haise received the Presidential Medal of Freedom, NASA Distinguished Service Medal, and NASA Exceptional Service Medal.

He was inducted into the International Space Hall of Fame in 1983 and the Aerospace Walk of Honor in 1995. He was also one of 24 Apollo astronauts inducted into the U.S. Astronaut Hall of Fame on October 4, 1997.

On February 13, 2022, the City of Biloxi unveiled a statue of Haise in the parking lot of the historic Biloxi Lighthouse. Haise was present at the ceremony and had his handprints set in concrete at the statue's base prior to its unveiling. The statue was created by Mississippi artist Mary Ott Tremel Davidson.

In September 2023, Haise was inducted into the National Aviation Hall of Fame in Dayton, Ohio.

In June 2026, the City of Biloxi dedicated the area around the Fred Haise statue as 'Fred Haise Landing.' A portion of Highway 90 from Porter Avenue to Kuhn Street has also been renamed as Astronaut Fred Haise Highway.

== In popular culture ==
In the 1995 motion picture Apollo 13, Haise was played by Bill Paxton.

In the 1998 HBO miniseries From the Earth to the Moon, Haise was played by Adam Baldwin.

== See also ==
- List of spaceflight records
- The Astronaut Monument
- Jack Swigert
- Jim Lovell

== Sources ==
- Adamo, Daniel (2009). "The Elusive Human Maximum Altitude Record". Quest: The History of Spaceflight Quarterly. Vol. 16, no. 4. ISSN 1065-7738.
- Glenday, Craig, ed. (2010). Guinness World Records 2010. New York: Bantam Books. ISBN 978-0-553-59337-2.
- Slayton, Donald K. "Deke"; Cassutt, Michael (1994). Deke! U.S. Manned Space: From Mercury to the Shuttle (1st ed.). New York: Forge. ISBN 978-0-312-85503-1.
