= Thomas McMurtry =

American mechanical engineer and test pilot

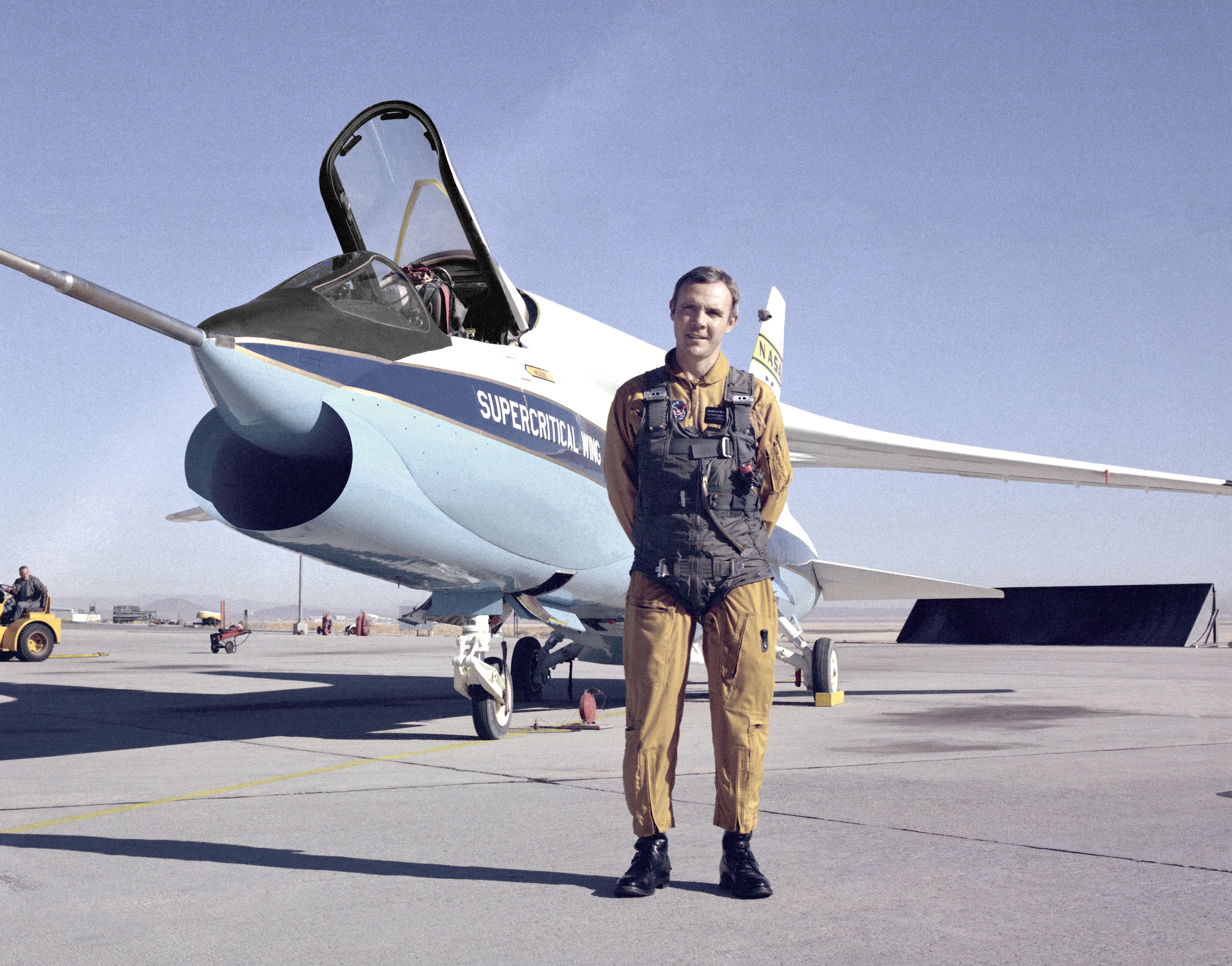
McMurtry before his flight on the Vought F-8A Crusader Supercritical Wing Airplane

Thomas C. McMurtry (June 4, 1935 - January 3, 2015) was an American mechanical engineer, and a former naval aviator, test pilot at NASA's Flight Research Center and a consultant for Lockheed Corporation.

== Early life and education ==
Born in Crawfordsville, Indiana, on 4 June 1935, McMurtry attended elementary school in Rockville, Indiana, and received his Bachelor of Science degree in mechanical engineering from the University of Notre Dame in June 1957.

== Military career ==
A former U.S. Navy pilot and graduate of the United States Naval Test Pilot School, NAS Patuxent River, Maryland, McMurtry was a consultant for Lockheed Corporation before joining NASA in 1967.

== NASA career ==
McMurtry joined NASA as a research test pilot in 1967. The first project he was assigned to as the project pilot was the F-8 Supercritical Wing project. He flew its first flight on 9 March 1971 and that of the NASA AD-1 on 21 December 1979. He was project pilot on the TF-8A Supercritical Wing testbed and the AD-1. He was co-project pilot on the F-8 Digital Fly-By-Wire Airplane, the 747 Shuttle Carrier Aircraft and performed digital electronic F-15 engine efficiency control tests. On 26 November 1975, the X-24B dropped from the sky for the last time, piloted on its 36th flight by McMurtry.

McMurtry co-piloted the 747 Carrier Aircraft as it transported the Space Shuttle Enterprise to its first launch on 12 August 1977. McMurtry logged over 11,000 hours of flying time since earning his pilot's wings in 1958. A graduate of the United States Naval Test Pilot School, he has flown many aircraft including the U-2, X-24B, F-8A, AD-1, YF-12C, F-104, and F-15. McMurtry became chief research test pilot and then Chief of the Research Aircraft Division for the NASA Ames-Dryden Flight Research Facility. He eventually rose to be the Director for Flight Operations at the NASA Dryden Flight Research Center, and retired on June 3, 1999, after 32 years of service and one day shy of his 64th birthday.

== Retirement ==
Following his retirement from NASA, McMurtry flew his WACO open cockpit biplane and a Piper Cub.

== Awards ==
McMurtry has been honored with the Society of Experimental Test Pilots' Iven C. Kincheloe Award for his work with the AD-1 Oblique Wing Airplane Program in 1982 and received Presidential recognition with the rank of Meritorious Executive in the Senior Executive Service. He was also awarded three NASA Exceptional Service Medals and the Aerospace Walk of Honor.

In 2012 McMurtry was nominated for an award by the Screen Actors Guild. He was Wolfe Air's lead Vectorvision pilot.

In 2014 he accepted the Wright Brothers Master Pilot Award.

== Gallery ==
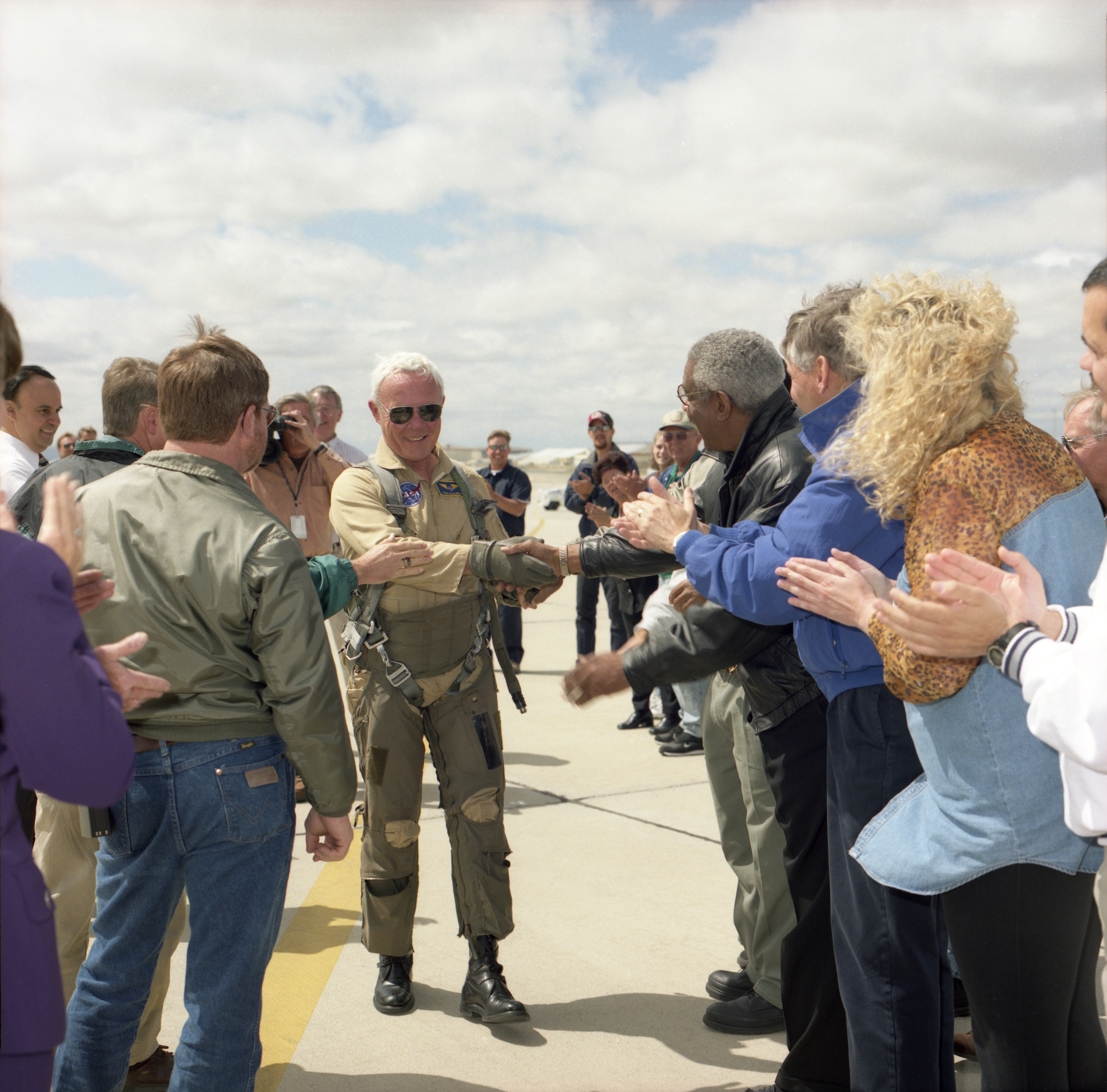
McMurtry's final flight at NASA

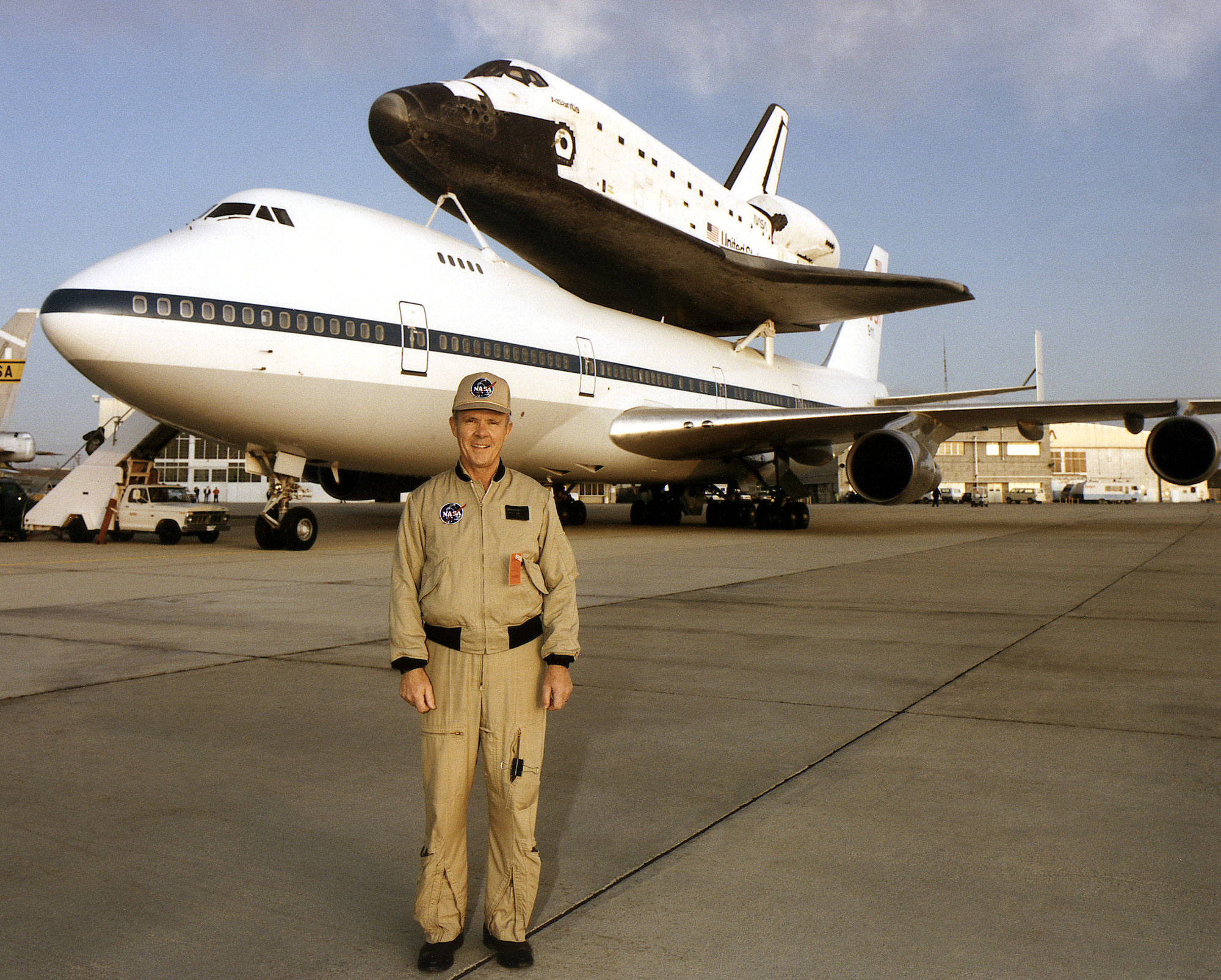
Tom McMurtry and the SCA

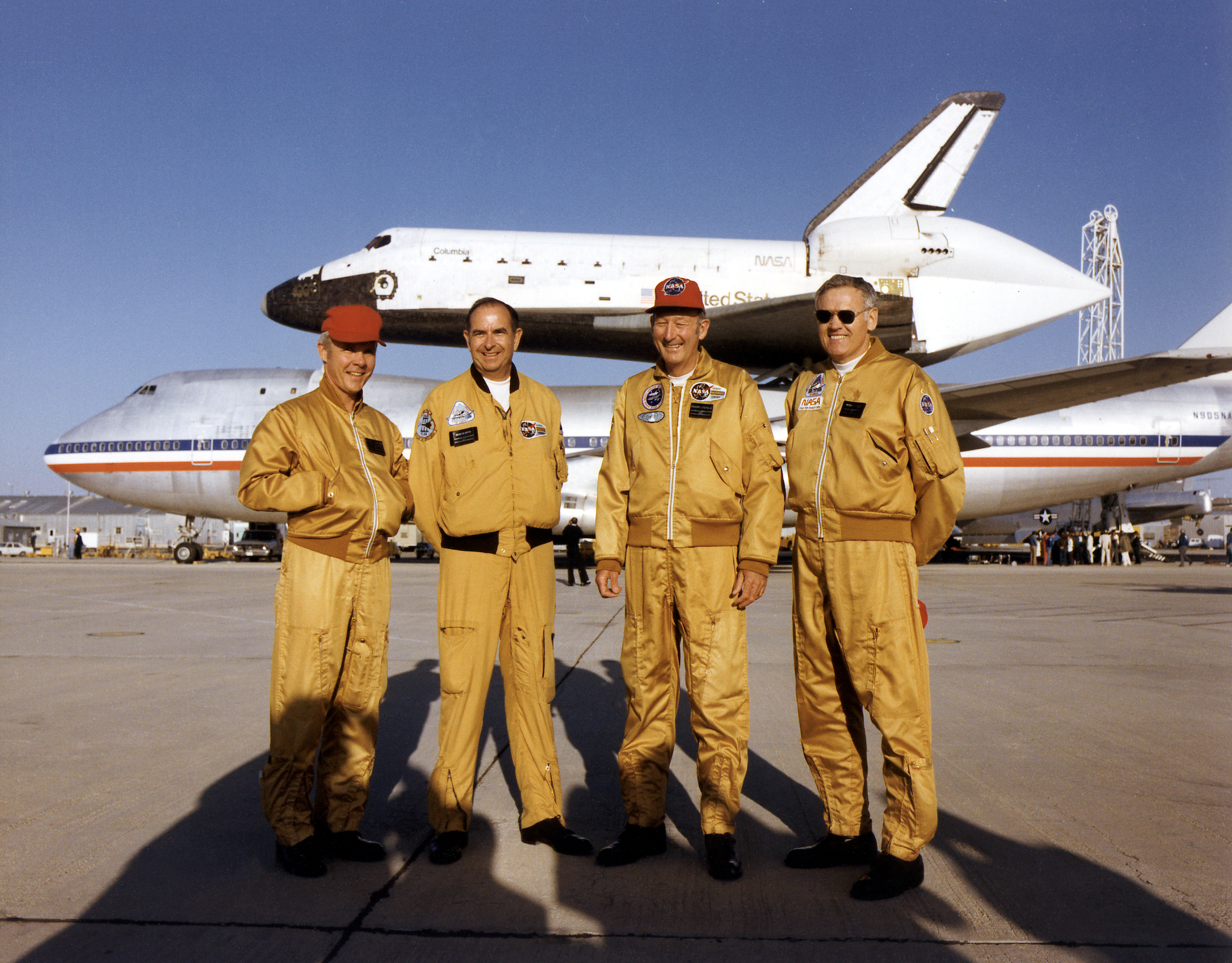
SCA Crew

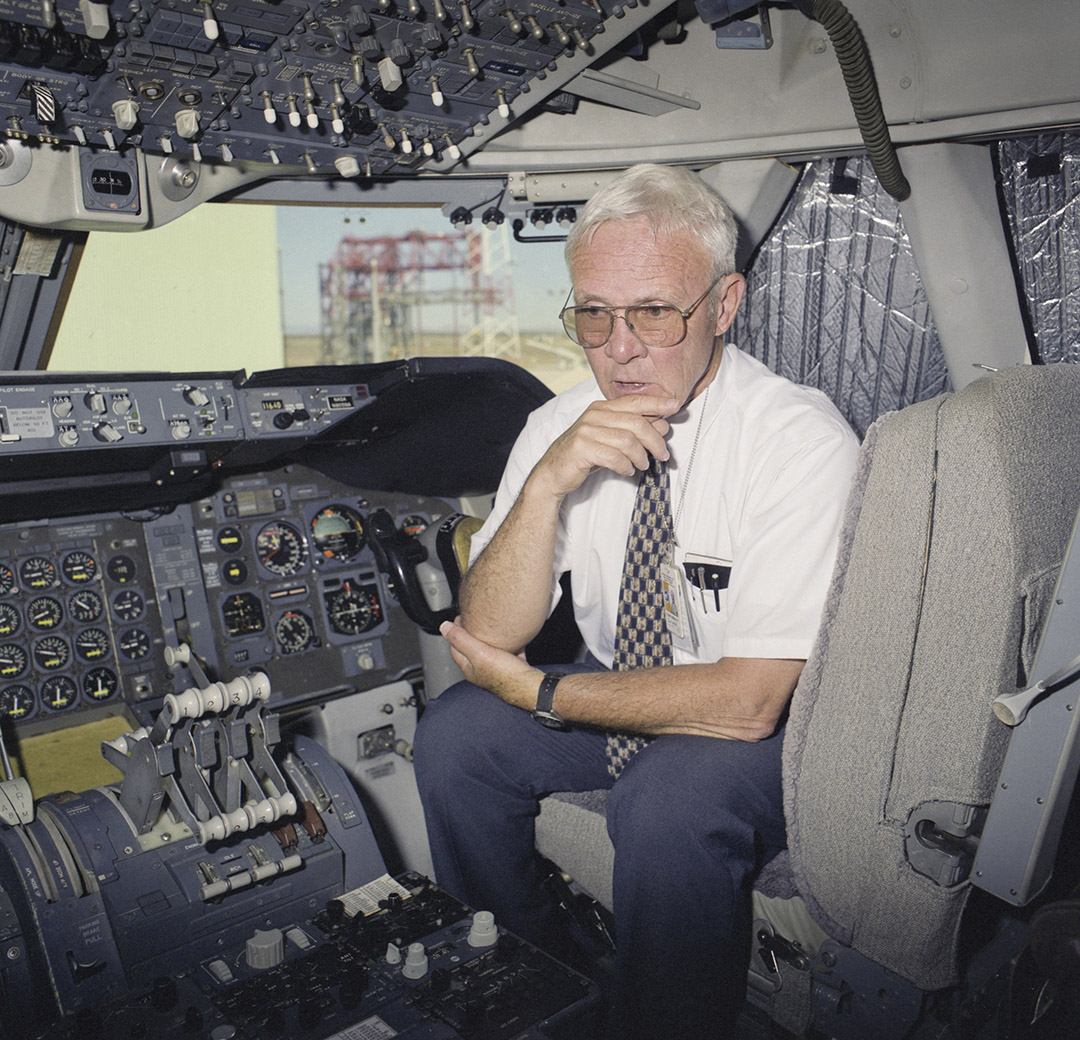
Tom McMurtry
