= Teleoperator Retrieval System =

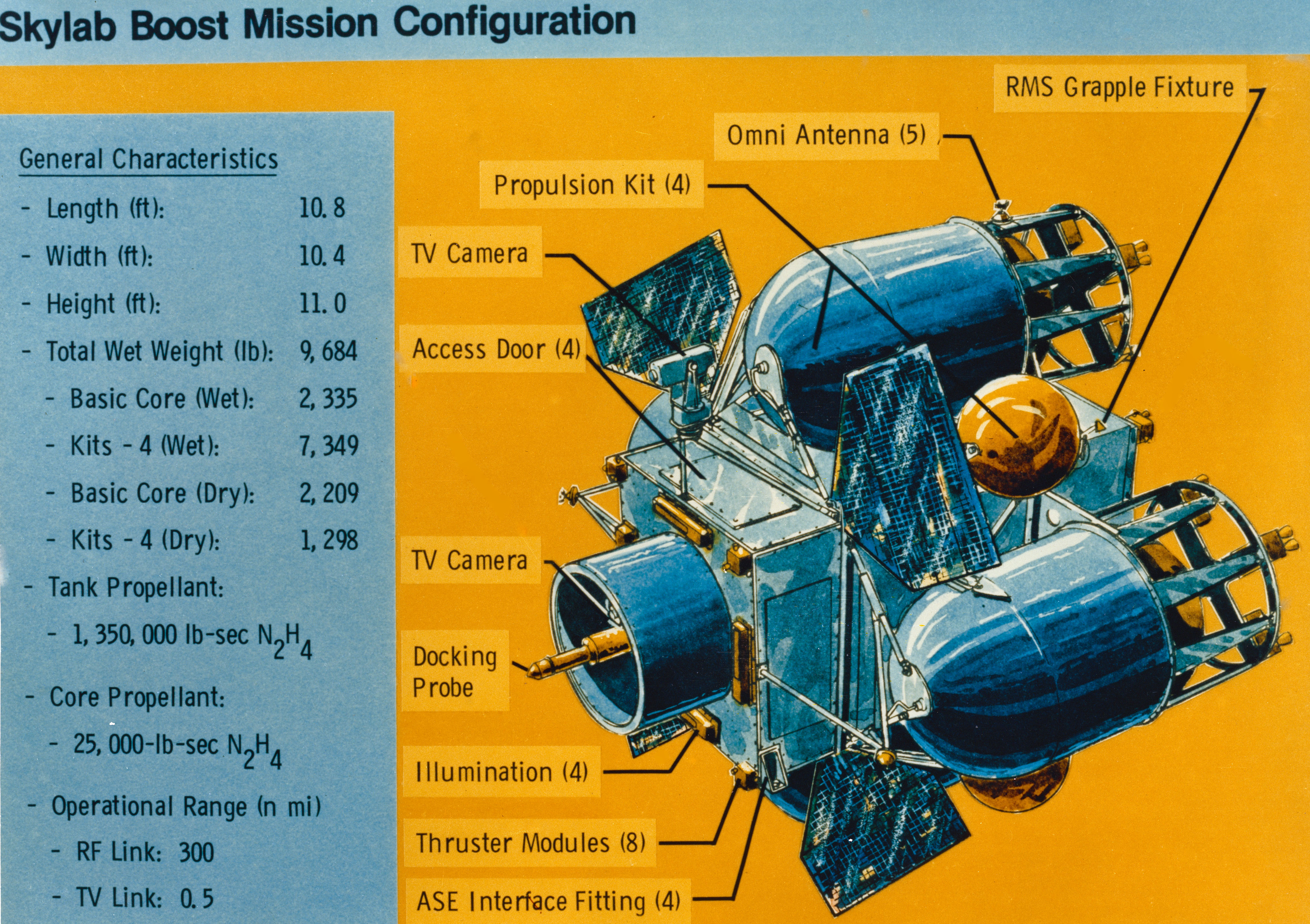
Diagram of the Teleoperator Retrieval System planned to be deployed on the Space Shuttle mission to Skylab.

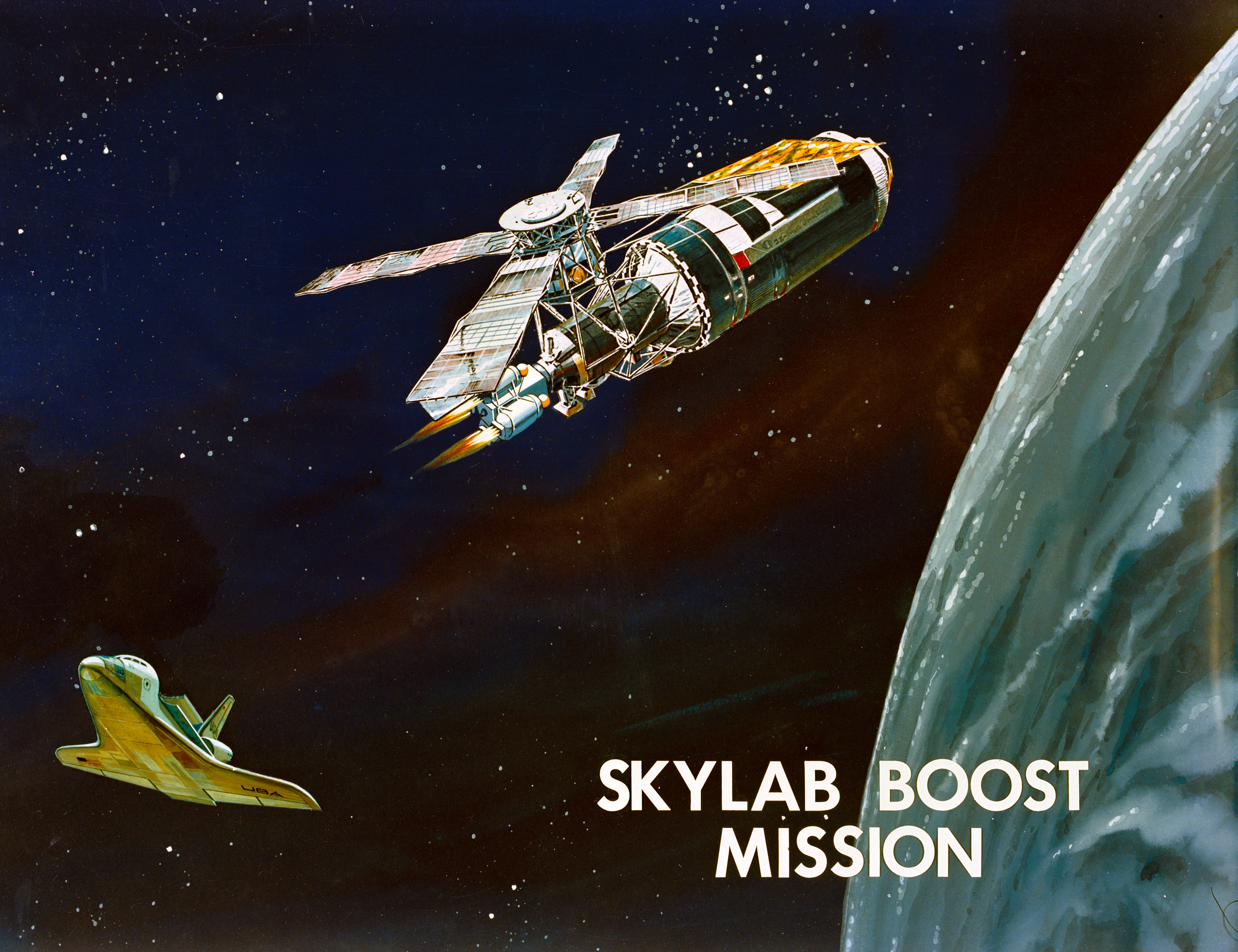
Illustration of TRS docked to Skylab with a Shuttle orbiter nearby

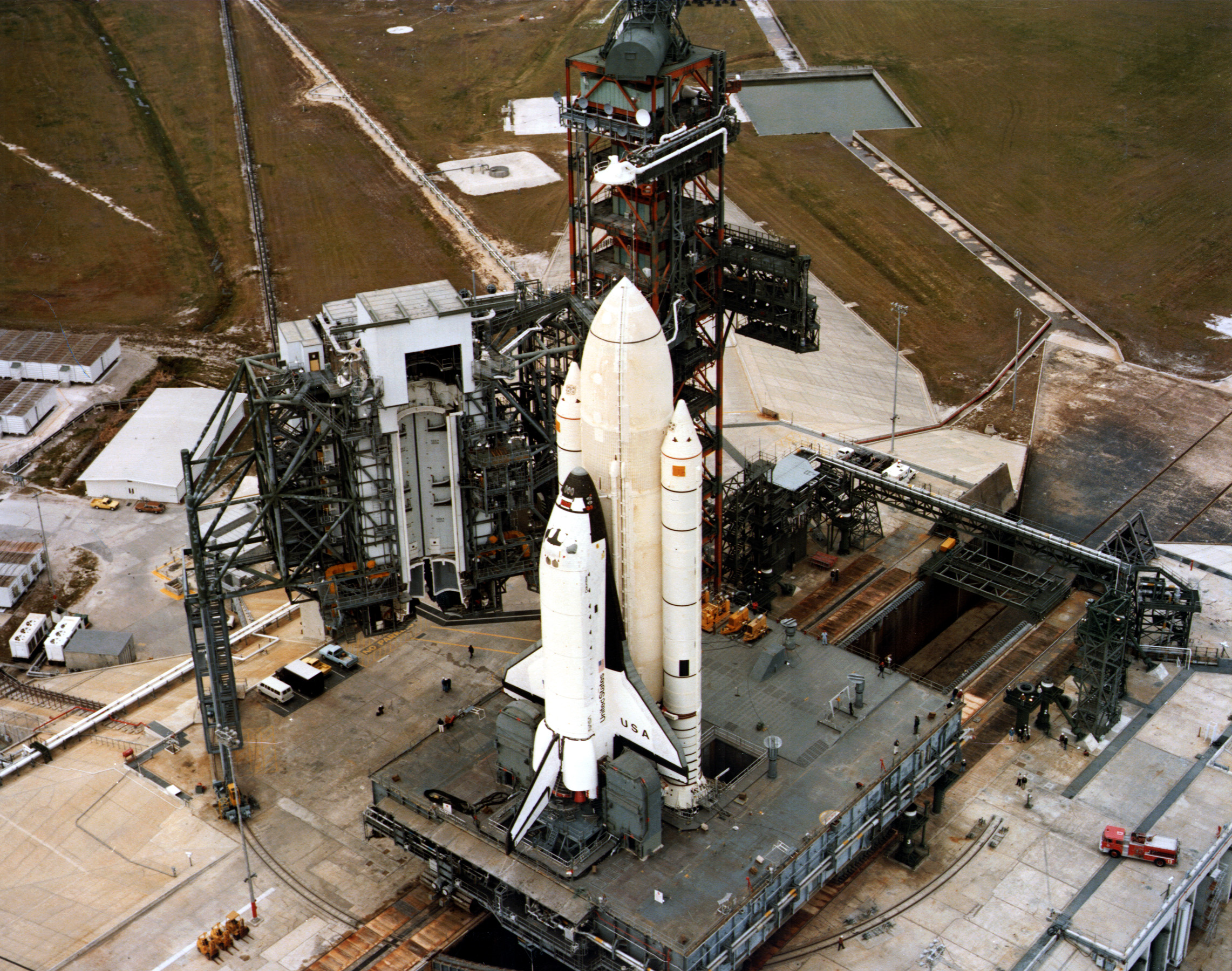
The NASA Space Shuttle makes it to the launchpad in 1980, too late for a Skylab boost

The Teleoperator Retrieval System was an uncrewed space tug ordered by NASA in the late 1970s to re-boost Skylab using the Space Shuttle.

== Description ==
TRS was a design for an uncrewed robotic space tug designed to be capable of remote payload observation and boosting or de-orbiting another spacecraft. It was developed to potentially re-boost the Skylab space station to a higher orbit. After Skylab 4, the third crewed mission to Skylab, plans were made to boost the station into a higher orbit to extend its service life or to de-orbit it into a remote ocean area. A remotely controlled booster rocket was to be carried up in the Space Shuttle's third mission. Astronaut Jack R. Lousma described the remote booster as "as big as a truck" and requiring a control system able to match the circular motion of the Skylab docking port. The core of TRS was a propulsion system that could accommodate additional fuel modules. It had a 24 nozzle 6-axis control thruster system to support Space rendezvous, docking, and orienting the spacecraft.

Other options for launching TRS were Titan III or Atlas Agena. Some launch options might have required two launches. Martin Marietta proposed the Titan III for launching TRS. The Titan IIIC could carry 29,600 lbs to low Earth orbit.

== History ==
The TRS was ordered in October 1977 to be ready for use in late 1979. The TRS had two major possible uses, to either re-boost or de-orbit Skylab. The decision whether to use TRS was planned to be made in 1979.

Although TRS was initiated in 1977, it made use of developments in tele-operation going back to the 1960s. In addition, another reason for its selection was the long-term use for task in general including "payload survey, stabilization, retrieval and delivery missions, recovery and re-use capability.."

The TRS project was overseen by the NASA Marshall Spaceflight Center.

Because of delays in STS-1, the first shuttle launch, Lousma and Fred Haise were reassigned to the second shuttle mission. NASA expected that the Shuttle would be ready by 1979, and Skylab would not re-enter until the early 1980s. Another factor was that, in 1975, it was decided not to launch a second Skylab (Skylab B); this gave a boost to Skylab re-use plans. As it was, the Shuttle was not ready until the early 1980s, and Skylab's orbit decayed in 1979. Lousma and Haise's mission was canceled when NASA realized that STS-1 would not be early enough before the station's reentry.

== Missions ==
Although the TRS in development was focused on Skylab boosting, it was thought it could be used for other satellites.

Possible future missions:

- "payload retrieval at higher orbits than Shuttle is designed to achieve"
- "large structure assembly"
- "emergency payload repairs"
- "retrieval of unstable objects or space debris"

== Specifications ==
Parts of the core, a box-like structure at center:

- 1.2 by 1.2 by 1.5 meters (4 by 4 by 5 feet) structural box
- attitude control thrusters
- propellant tank
- guidance system
- navigation system
- control system
- communications and data management system
- docking system
- two TV cameras

The core was surrounded by four strap-on propulsion modules, which include an additional propellant tank with its own rocket engines.

== Thruster systems and boost rockets ==
There was a triple group of attitude (direction) thrusters on each of the spacecraft's eight corners. Each thruster was intended to produce a thrust of 2.25 to 4.5-kilograms (5 to 10-pounds) These thrusters would be used for leaving the Shuttle's payload bay and for rendezvous and docking with Skylab.

For the Skylab boost or de-orbit, the TRS would have four strap-on boosters each with 680 kg (1,500 Ib.) of hydrazine rocket fuel. This was a modular design, and the TRS could also be used with 2-strap on boosters if the mission only needed that amount. In other words, the TRS was designed for use with 4 boosters, but it was also intended it could also use 2 for example.

== Control systems ==
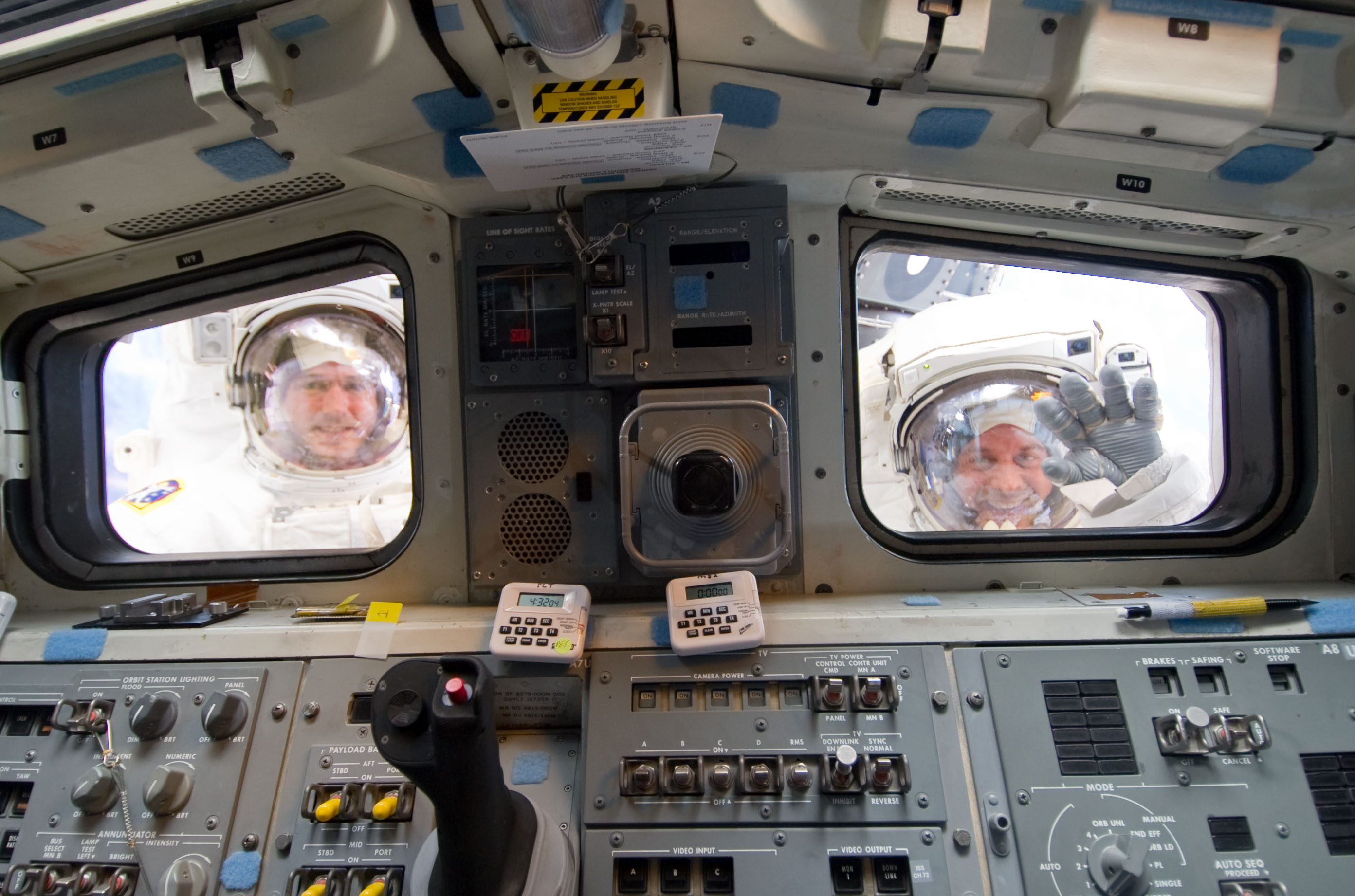
The aft flight deck of the Shuttle Orbiter Vehicle

The TRS had its own computing and control systems, or it would be controlled by a crewman in the Shuttle Orbiter vehicle.

== See also ==
- Mission Extension Vehicle
- Orbital station-keeping
