= McDonnell Douglas F/A-18 Hornet =

American carrier-capable multirole strike aircraft

F/A-18 Hornet
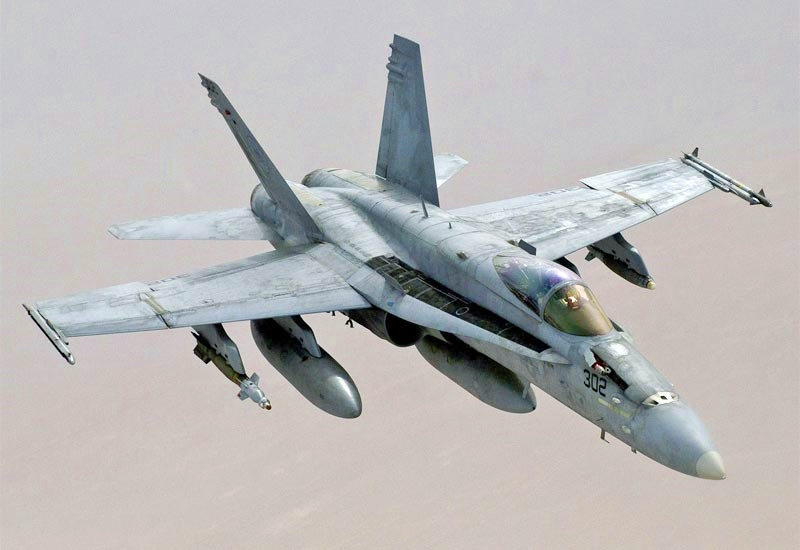
- A U.S. Navy F/A-18C in flight

General information
- Type: Multirole fighter
- National origin: United States
- Manufacturer: McDonnell Douglas (1974–1997) with Northrop (1974–1994); Boeing (1997–2000)
- Status: In service
- Primary users: United States Navy (historical) United States Marine Corps; Finnish Air Force; Spanish Air and Space Force
- Number built: F/A-18A/B/C/D: 1,480

History
- Manufactured: 1974–2000
- Introduction date: 7 January 1983 (USMC); 1 July 1984 (USN)
- First flight: 18 November 1978; 47 years ago
- Retired: 2019 (Hornet, USN); 2021 (RAAF)
- Developed from: Northrop YF-17
- Variants: McDonnell Douglas CF-18 Hornet; High Alpha Research Vehicle
- Developed into: Boeing F/A-18E/F Super Hornet; Boeing X-53 Active Aeroelastic Wing

The McDonnell Douglas F/A-18 Hornet is an all-weather supersonic, twin-engined, carrier-capable, multirole combat aircraft, designed as both a fighter and ground attack aircraft (hence the F/A designation). Designed by McDonnell Douglas and Northrop, the F/A-18 was derived from the YF-17 that lost against the YF-16 in the United States Air Force's lightweight fighter program. The United States Navy selected the YF-17 for the Navy Air Combat Fighter program, further developed the design and renamed it F/A-18; the United States Marine Corps would also adopt the aircraft. The Hornet is also used by the air forces of several other nations, and formerly by the U.S. Navy's Flight Demonstration Squadron, the Blue Angels.

The F/A-18 was designed to be a highly versatile aircraft due to its avionics, cockpit displays, and excellent aerodynamic characteristics for high angles-of-attack maneuvers, with the ability to carry a wide variety of weapons. The aircraft can perform fighter escort, fleet air defense, suppression of enemy air defenses, air interdiction, close air support, and aerial reconnaissance. Its versatility and reliability have proven it to be a valuable carrier asset.

The Hornet entered operational service with the U.S. Navy in 1983, gradually replacing the A-7 Corsair II and the remaining F-4 Phantom IIs. The aircraft first saw combat action during the 1986 United States bombing of Libya and subsequently participated in the 1991 Gulf War, operations over Bosnia and Kosovo in the 1990s, and in the 2003 Iraq War as well as follow-on operations in the Middle East. The F/A-18 Hornet served as the baseline for the F/A-18E/F Super Hornet, its larger, evolutionary redesign, which supplanted both the older Hornet and the F-14 Tomcat in the U.S. Navy. The remaining legacy Navy Hornets were retired in 2019 with the fielding of the F-35C Lightning II.

== Development ==
=== Origins ===
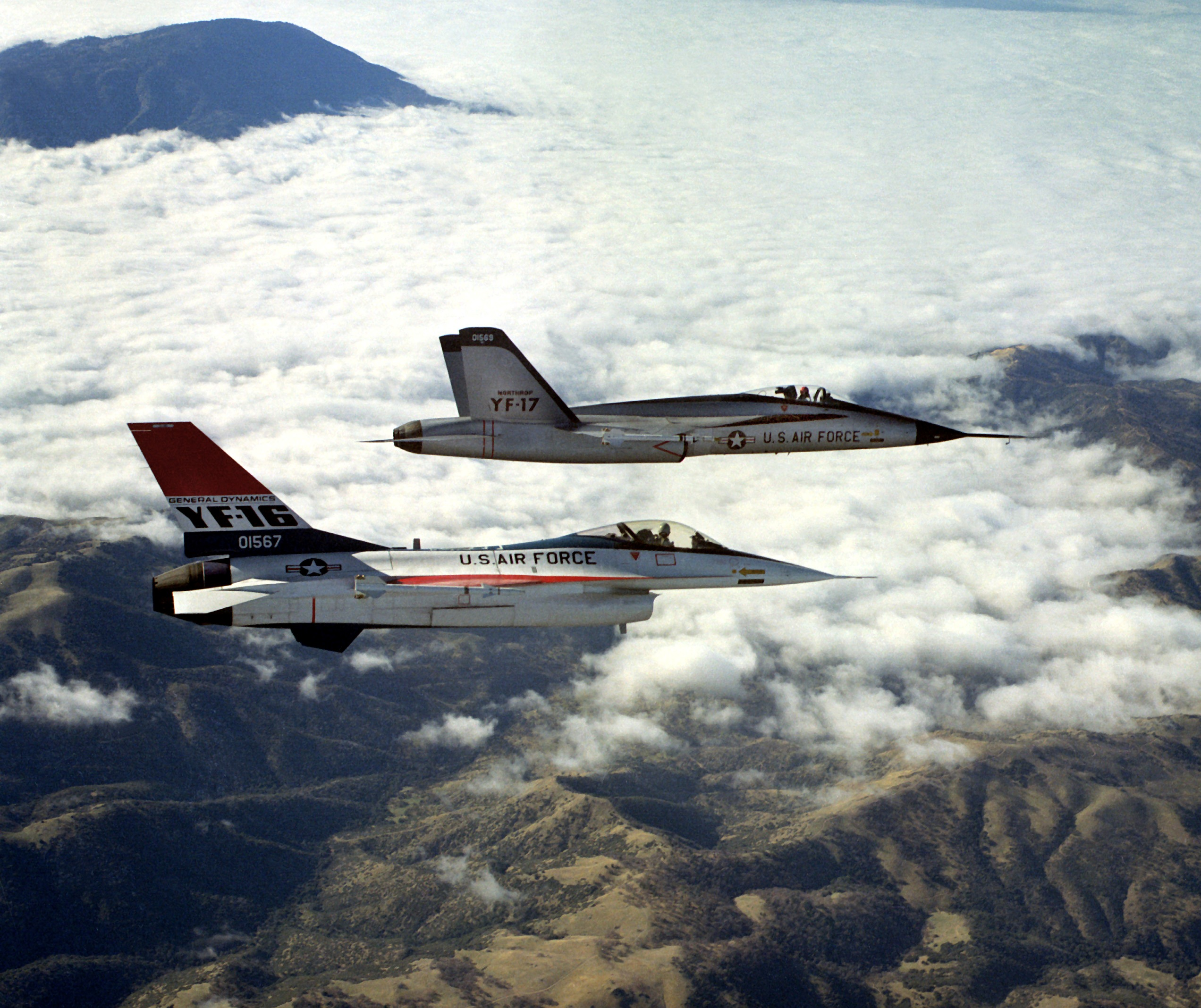
YF-16 and YF-17 prototypes being tested by the U.S. Air Force

The United States Navy started the Naval Fighter-Attack, Experimental (VFAX) program to procure a multirole aircraft to replace the Douglas A-4 Skyhawk, the A-7 Corsair II, and the remaining McDonnell Douglas F-4 Phantom IIs, and to complement the Grumman F-14 Tomcat. Vice Admiral Kent Lee, then head of Naval Air Systems Command, was the lead advocate for the VFAX against strong opposition from many Navy officers, including Vice Admiral William D. Houser, deputy chief of naval operations for air warfare – the highest-ranking naval aviator.

In August 1973, Congress mandated that the Navy pursue a lower-cost alternative to the F-14. Grumman proposed a stripped F-14 designated the F-14X, while McDonnell Douglas proposed a naval variant of the F-15, but both were nearly as expensive as the F-14. That summer, Secretary of Defense James R. Schlesinger ordered the Navy to evaluate the competitors in the Air Force's Lightweight Fighter (LWF) program, the General Dynamics YF-16 and Northrop YF-17. The Air Force competition specified a day fighter with no strike capability. In May 1974, the House Armed Services Committee redirected $34 million from the VFAX to a new program, the Navy Air Combat Fighter (NACF), intended to make maximum use of the technology developed for the LWF program.

=== Redesigning the YF-17 ===
Though the YF-16 won the LWF competition, the Navy was skeptical that an aircraft with one engine and narrow landing gear could be easily or economically adapted to carrier service, and refused to adopt an F-16 naval derivative – the Vought Model 1600 – proposed by Vought/General Dynamics. On 2 May 1975, the Navy announced its selection of the YF-17. Since the LWF did not share the design requirements of the VFAX, the Navy asked McDonnell Douglas and Northrop to develop a new aircraft from the design and principles of the YF-17. On 1 March 1977, Secretary of the Navy W. Graham Claytor announced, that the F-18 would be named "Hornet", after the characteristics of the Hornet insect. It also shares the namesake with ships that had borne the name USS Hornet since the Revolutionary War.

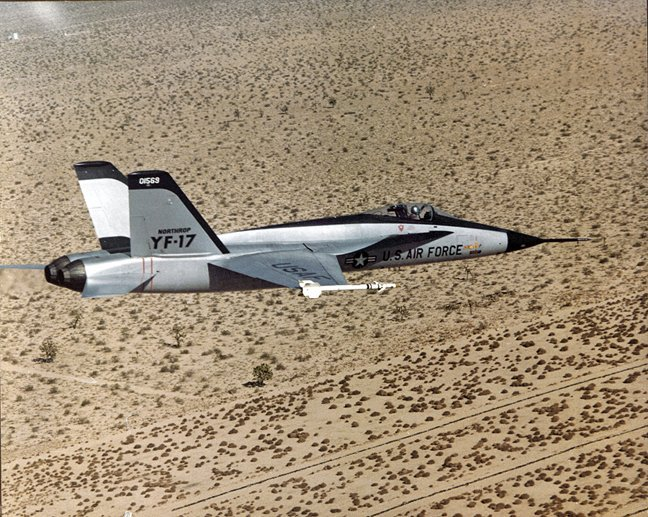
The Northrop YF-17 Cobra was developed into the carrier-capable F/A-18.

Northrop had partnered with McDonnell Douglas as a secondary contractor on NACF to capitalize on the latter's experience in building carrier aircraft, including the widely used F-4 Phantom II. On the F-18, the two companies agreed to evenly split component manufacturing, with McDonnell Douglas conducting the final assembly. McDonnell Douglas would build the wings, stabilators, and forward fuselage, while Northrop would build the center and aft fuselage as well as the vertical stabilizers. McDonnell Douglas was the prime contractor for the naval versions, and Northrop would be the prime contractor for the F-18L land-based version which Northrop hoped to sell on the export market.

The F-18, initially known as McDonnell Douglas Model 267, was drastically modified from the YF-17. For carrier operations, the airframe, undercarriage, and tailhook were strengthened, folding wings and catapult attachments were added, and the landing gear was widened. Another wheel was added to the front landing gear as well. To meet Navy range and reserves requirements, McDonnell increased fuel capacity by 4,460 pounds (2,020 kg), by enlarging the dorsal spine and adding a 96-gallon fuel tank to each wing. A "snag" was added to the wing's leading edge and stabilators to prevent an aeroelastic flutter discovered in the F-15 stabilator. The wings and stabilators were enlarged, the aft fuselage widened by 4 inches (102 mm), and the engines canted outward at the front. These changes added 10,000 lb (4,540 kg) to the gross weight, bringing it to 37,000 lb (16,800 kg). The YF-17's control system was replaced with a fully digital fly-by-wire system with quadruple redundancy, the first to be installed in a production fighter. The airframe was designed for a service life of 6,000 flight hours.

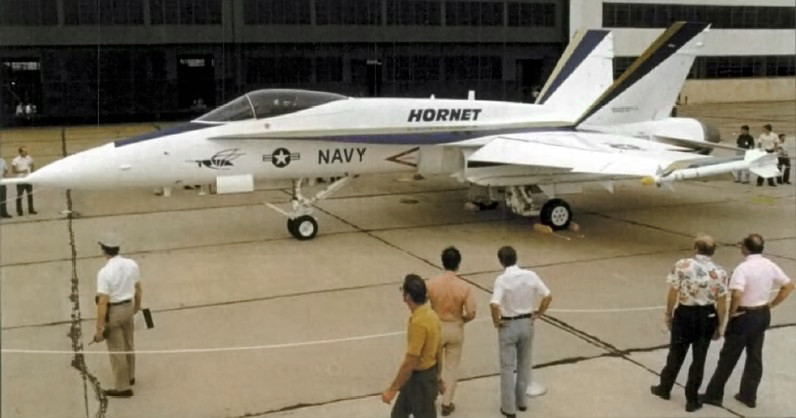
The first F/A-18A on display in October 1978

Originally, plans were to acquire a total of 780 aircraft of three variants: the single-seat F-18A fighter and A-18A attack aircraft, differing only in avionics, and the dual-seat TF-18A, which retained full mission capability of the F-18 with a reduced fuel load. Following improvements in avionics and multifunction displays, and a redesign of external stores stations, the A-18A and F-18A were able to be combined into one aircraft. Starting in 1980, the aircraft began to be referred to as the F/A-18A, and the designation was officially announced on 1 April 1984. The TF-18A was redesignated F/A-18B.

=== Northrop's F-18L ===
Northrop developed the F-18L as a potential export aircraft. Since it was not strengthened for carrier service, it was expected to be lighter and better performing, and a strong competitor to the F-16 Fighting Falcon then being offered to American allies. The F-18L's normal gross weight was lighter than the F/A-18A by 7,700 pounds (3,490 kg), via lighter landing gear, lack of wing folding mechanism, reduced part thickness in areas, and lower fuel-carrying capacity. Though the aircraft retained a lightened tailhook, the most obvious external difference was the removal of "snags" on the leading edge of the wings and stabilators. It still retained 71% commonality with the F/A-18 by parts weight, and 90% of the high-value systems, including the avionics, radar, and electronic countermeasure suite, though alternatives were offered. Unlike the F/A-18, the F-18L carried no fuel in its wings and lacked weapons stations on the intakes. It had three underwing pylons on each side, instead.

The F/A-18L was essentially an F/A-18A lightened by about 2,500 to 3,000 pounds (1,130 to 1,360 kg); weight was reduced by removing the folding wing and associated actuators, implementing a simpler landing gear (single wheel nose gear and cantilever oleo main gear), and changing to a land-based tail hook. The revised F/A-18L included wing fuel tanks and fuselage stations of the F/A-18A. Its weapons capacity would increase from 13,700 to 20,000 pounds (6,210 to 9,070 kg), largely due to the addition of a third underwing pylon and strengthened wingtips (11 stations in total vs 9 stations of the F/A-18A). Compared to the F-18L, the outboard weapons pylons are closer to the wingtip missile rails. Because of the strengthened nonfolding wing, the wingtip missile rails were designed to carry either the AIM-7 Sparrow (7F/7M/7P variants, same as the F/A-18A) or Skyflash medium-range air-to-air missiles, in addition to the AIM-9 Sidewinder as found on the F/A-18A. The F/A-18L was strengthened for a 9g design load factor compared to the F/A-18A's 7.5g factor.

The partnership between McDonnell Douglas and Northrop soured over competition for foreign sales for the two models. Northrop felt that McDonnell Douglas would put the F/A-18 in direct competition with the F-18L. In October 1979, Northrop filed a series of lawsuits charging that McDonnell was using Northrop technology developed for the F-18L for foreign sales of the F/A-18 in violation of their agreement, and asked for a moratorium on foreign sales of the Hornet. McDonnell Douglas countersued, alleging Northrop illegally used F/A-18 technology in its F-20 Tigershark. A settlement was announced 8 April 1985 for all of the lawsuits. McDonnell Douglas paid Northrop $50 million for "rights to sell the F/A-18 wherever it could". Additionally, the companies agreed on McDonnell Douglas as the prime contractor with Northrop as the principal subcontractor. As principal subcontractor, Northrop produced the rear section for the F/A-18 (initially the A/B, then the C/D and eventually also the E/F Super Hornet), while McDonnell Douglas produced the rest with final assembly performed by McDonnell Douglas. At the time of the settlement, Northrop had ceased work on the F-18L. Most export orders for the F-18L were captured by the F-16 or the F/A-18. The F-20 Tigershark did not enter production, and although the program was not officially terminated until 17 November 1986, functionally it was dead by mid-1985.

=== Into production ===
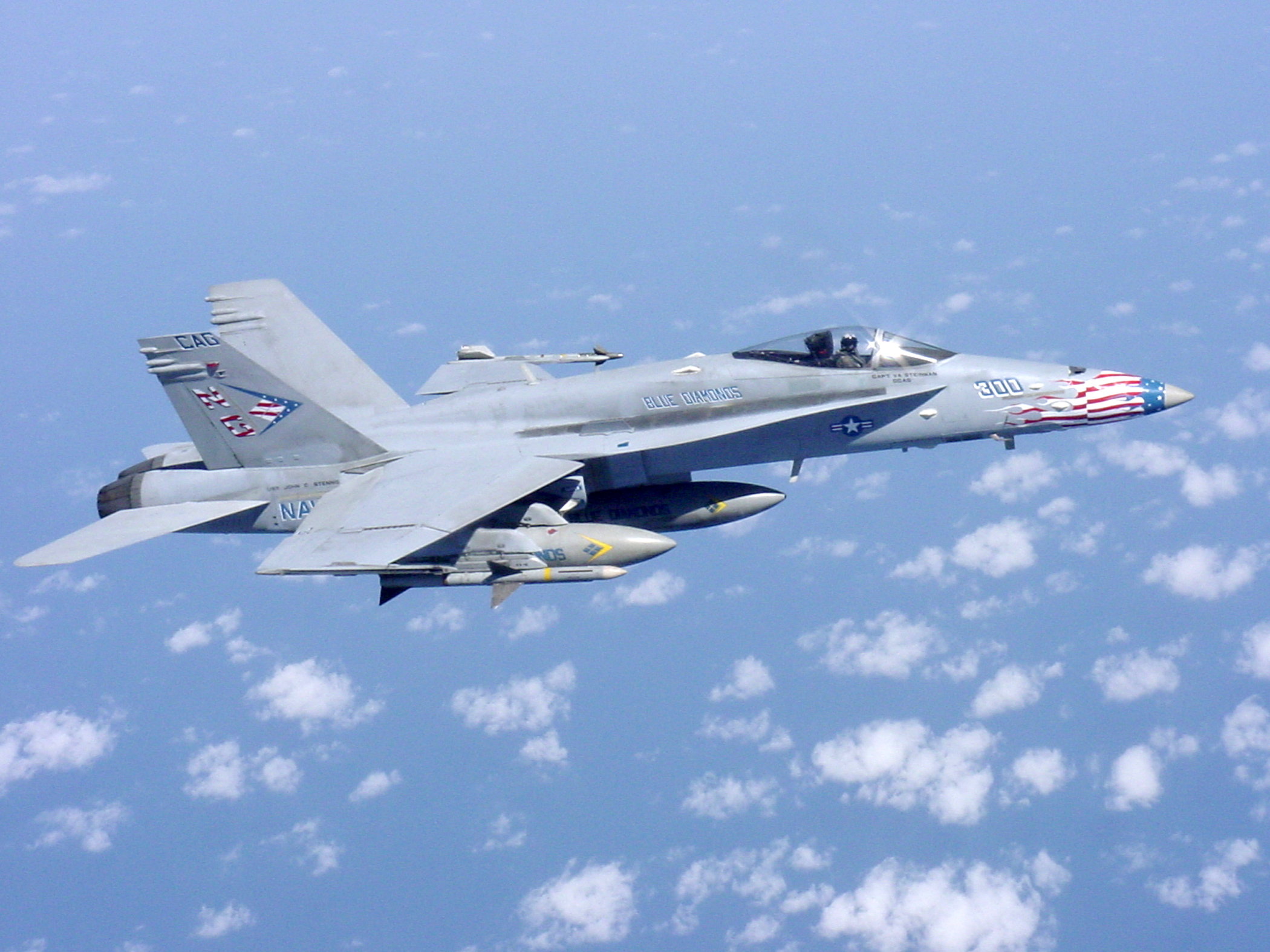
U.S. Navy F/A-18C during Operation Enduring Freedom in 2002

During flight testing, the snag on the leading edge of the stabilators was filled in, and the gap between the leading-edge extensions (LEX) and the fuselage was mostly filled in. The gaps, called the boundary layer air discharge slots, controlled the vortices generated by the LEX and presented clean air to the vertical stabilizers at high angles of attack, but they also generated a great deal of parasitic drag, worsening the problem of the F/A-18's inadequate range. McDonnell filled in 80% of the gap, leaving a small slot to bleed air from the engine intake. This may have contributed to early problems with fatigue cracks appearing on the vertical stabilizers due to extreme structural loads, resulting in a short grounding in 1984 until the stabilizers were strengthened. Starting in May 1988, a small vertical fence was added to the top of each LEX to broaden the vortices and direct them away from the vertical stabilizers. This also provided a minor increase in controllability as a side effect. F/A-18s of early versions had a problem with insufficient rate of roll, exacerbated by the insufficient wing stiffness, especially with heavy underwing ordnance loads. The first production F/A-18A flew on 12 April 1980. After a production run of 380 F/A-18As (including the nine assigned to flight systems development), manufacture shifted to the F/A-18C in September 1987.

=== Improvements and design changes ===
In the 1990s, the U.S. Navy faced the need to replace its aging A-6 Intruders and A-7 Corsair IIs with no replacement in development. To answer this deficiency, the Navy commissioned development of the F/A-18E/F Super Hornet. Despite its designation, it is not just an upgrade of the F/A-18 Hornet, but rather, a new, larger airframe using the design concepts of the Hornet. Hornets and Super Hornets will serve complementary roles in the U.S. Navy carrier fleet until the Hornet A-D models are completely replaced by the F-35C Lightning II. Although the airframe was originally designed for service life of 6,000 flight hours, the Marines have chosen to extend the use of certain F/A-18s up to 10,000 flight hours, due to delays in the F-35B variant.

=== End of production ===
Production of the C- and D- models ended in 2000, with the plant transitioning to the F/A-18E/F Super Hornets. The last F/A-18C was assembled in Finland and delivered to the Finnish Air Force in August 2000. The last F/A-18D was delivered to the U.S. Marine Corps in August 2000. Production of the F/A-18E/F is scheduled to end in 2027.

== Design ==
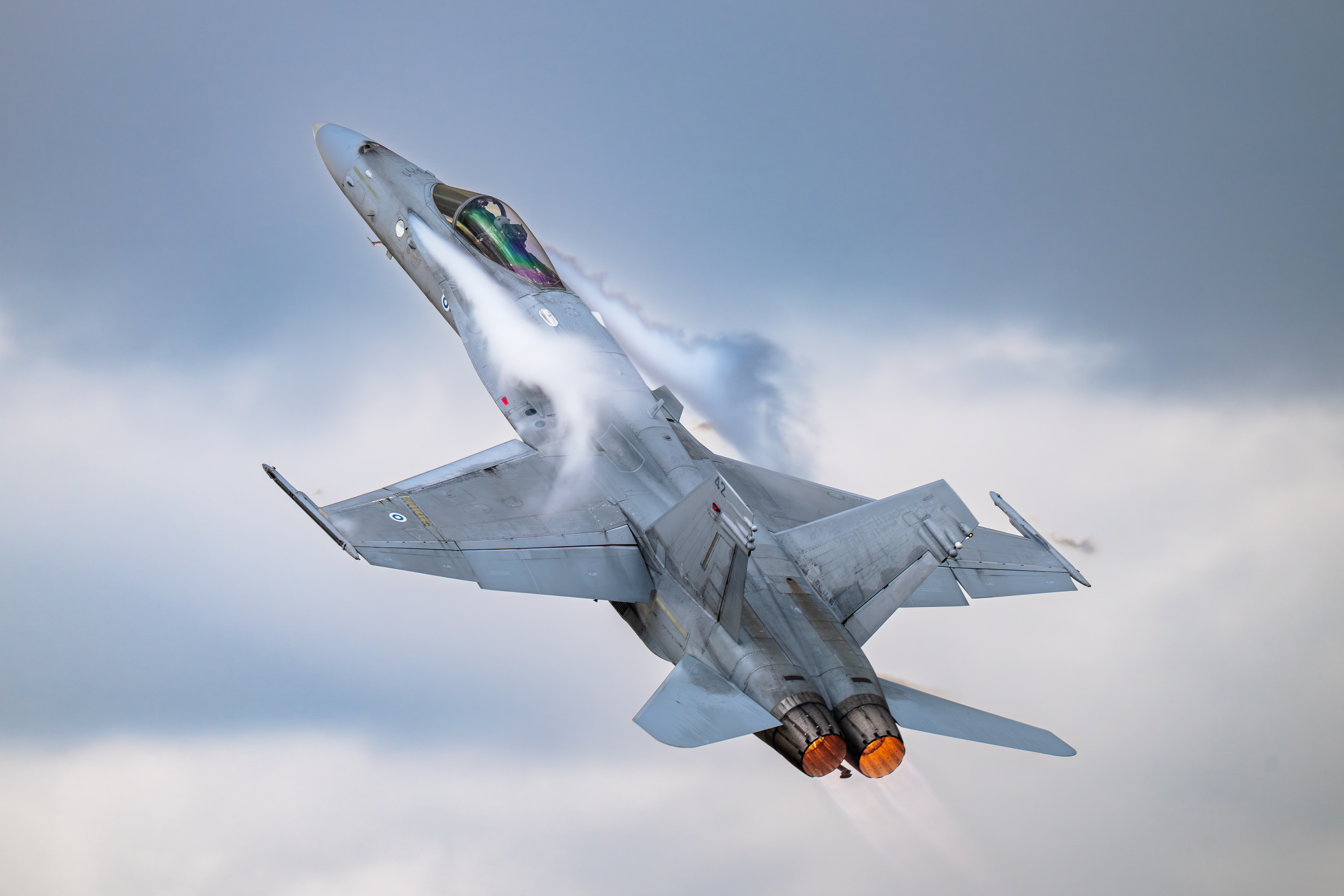
F/A-18C Hornet performing a high-g pull-up. The high angle of attack causes powerful vortices to form at the leading edge extensions.

The F/A-18 is a twin engine, midwing, multimission tactical aircraft. It is highly maneuverable, due to its good thrust-to-weight ratio, digital fly-by-wire control system, and leading-edge extensions, which allow the Hornet to remain controllable at high angles of attack. The trapezoidal wing has a 20-degree sweepback on the leading edge and a straight trailing edge. The wing has full-span, leading-edge flaps and the trailing edge has single-slotted flaps and ailerons over the entire span.

Canted vertical stabilizers are another distinguishing design element, one among several other such elements that enable the Hornet's excellent high angle of attack ability, including oversized horizontal stabilators, oversized trailing-edge flaps that operate as flaperons, large full-length leading-edge slats, and flight control computer programming that multiplies the movement of each control surface at low speeds and moves the vertical rudders inboard instead of simply left and right. The Hornet's normally high angle of attack performance envelope was put to rigorous testing and enhanced in the NASA F-18 High Alpha Research Vehicle (HARV). NASA used the F-18 HARV to demonstrate flight handling characteristics at high angle-of-attack (alpha) of 65–70 degrees using thrust vectoring vanes. F/A-18 stabilators were also used as canards on NASA's F-15S/MTD.

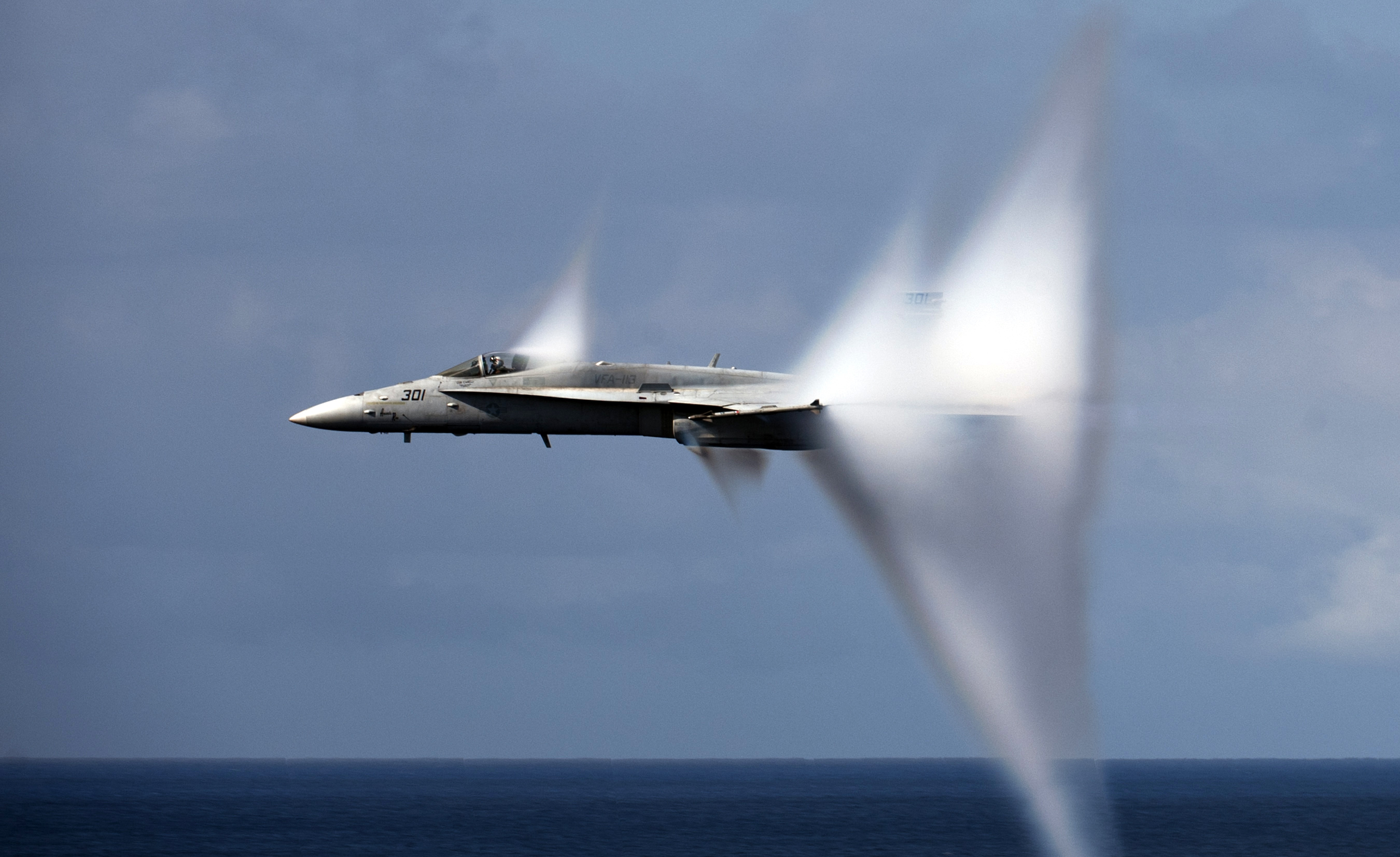
F/A-18C Hornet in transonic flight producing flow-induced vapor cone

The Hornet was among the first aircraft to heavily use multifunction displays, which at the switch of a button allow a pilot to perform either fighter or attack roles or both. This "force multiplier" ability gives the operational commander more flexibility to employ tactical aircraft in a fast-changing battle scenario. It was the first Navy aircraft to incorporate a digital multiplexing avionics bus, enabling easy upgrades.

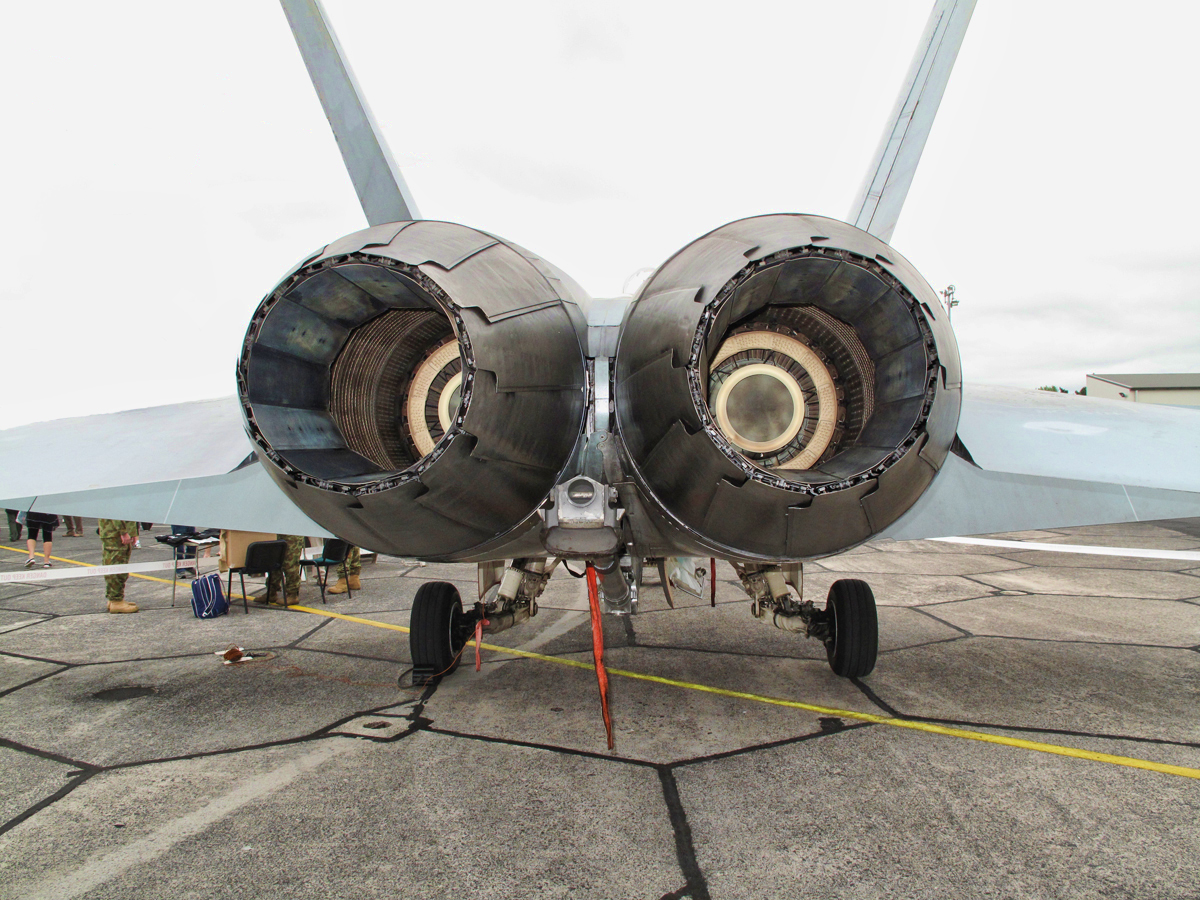
Exhaust nozzles of an RAAF F/A-18

The Hornet was designed to reduce maintenance, and as a result, has required far less downtime than its heavier counterparts, the F-14 Tomcat and the A-6 Intruder. Its mean time between failures is three times greater than any other Navy strike aircraft, and requires half the maintenance time. Its General Electric F404 engines were also innovative in that they were designed with operability, reliability, and maintainability first. The engine, while unexceptional in rated performance, demonstrates exceptional robustness under various conditions and is resistant to stall and flameout. The F404 engine connects to the airframe at only 10 points and can be replaced without special equipment: a four-person team can remove the engine within 20 minutes. The aircraft has a top speed of Mach 1.8 at 40,000 ft.

The engine air inlets of the Hornet, like those of the F-16, are of a simpler "fixed" pitot-type design, while those of the F-4, F-14, and F-15 have variable geometry or variable intake ramp air inlets. The fixed-geometry design is simpler, lighter, and less maintenance-intensive than variable geometry inlets, at the expense of pressure recovery performance at higher Mach numbers. This was considered a worthwhile tradeoff as the aircraft was designed to primarily operate at subsonic and transonic speeds.

A 1989 USMC study found that single-seat fighters were well suited to air-to-air combat missions, while dual-seat fighters were favored for complex strike missions against heavy air and ground defenses in adverse weather—the question being not so much as to whether a second pair of eyes would be useful, but as to having the second crewman sit in the same fighter or in a second fighter. Single-seat fighters that lacked wingmen were shown to be especially vulnerable.

== Operational history ==
=== United States ===
==== Entry into service ====
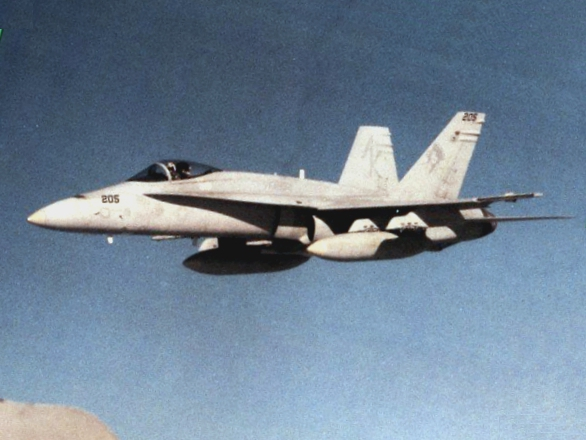
A F/A-18A Hornet from VFA-132 Privateers in flight, circa 1985

McDonnell Douglas rolled out the first F/A-18A on 13 September 1978, in blue-on-white colors marked with "Navy" on the left and "Marines" on the right. Its first flight was on 18 November. In a break with tradition, the Navy pioneered the "principal site concept" with the F/A-18, where almost all testing was done at Naval Air Station Patuxent River, instead of near the site of manufacture, and using Navy and Marine Corps test pilots instead of civilians early in development. In March 1979, Lt. Cdr. John Padgett became the first Navy pilot to fly the F/A-18.

Following trials and operational testing by VX-4 and VX-5, Hornets began to fill the Fleet Replacement Squadrons VFA-125, VFA-106, and VMFAT-101, where pilots are introduced to the F/A-18. The Hornet entered operational service with Marine Corps squadron VMFA-314 at MCAS El Toro on 7 January 1983, and with Navy squadrons VFA-113 and VFA-25 on 1 July 1984, replacing F-4s and A-7Es, respectively.

Navy strike-fighter squadrons VFA-25 and VFA-113 (assigned to CVW-14) deployed aboard USS Constellation from February to August 1985, marking the first deployment for the F/A-18.

The initial fleet reports were complimentary, indicating that the Hornet was extraordinarily reliable, a major change from its predecessor, the F-4J. In January 1985, the VFA-131 "Wildcats" and the VFA-132 "Privateers" moved from Naval Air Station Lemoore, California to Naval Air Station Cecil Field, Florida to become the Atlantic Fleet's first F/A-18 squadrons. VFA-151, VFA-161, VFA-192 and VFA-195 transitioned to the F/A-18A in 1986. With the exception of VFA-161, the rest would move to NAF Atsugi, Japan to join CVW-5 and the USS Midway. Other squadrons that switched to F/A-18 included VFA-146 "Blue Diamonds", and VFA-147 "Argonauts".

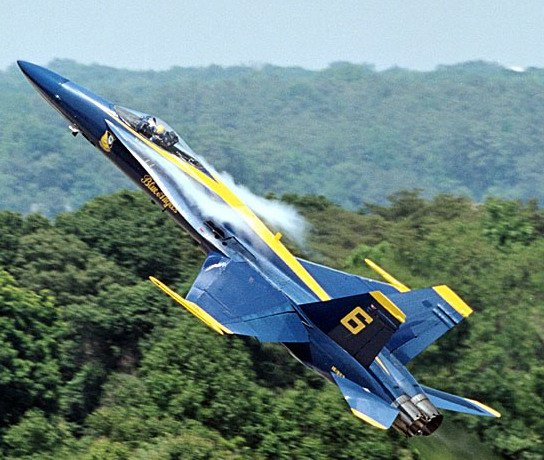
Blue Angels' No. 6 F/A-18A

The U.S. Navy's Blue Angels Flight Demonstration Squadron switched to the F/A-18 Hornet in 1986, replacing the A-4 Skyhawk. The Blue Angels performed in F/A-18A, B, C, and D models at air shows and other special events across the US and worldwide before transitioning to the F/A-18E/F Super Hornet in late 2020. Blue Angels pilots must have 1,250 hours and an aircraft-carrier certification. The two-seat B and D models were typically used to give rides to VIPs, but also filled in for other aircraft, if such a need arose.

NASA operates several F/A-18 aircraft for research purposes and also as chase aircraft; these F/A-18s are based at the Armstrong Flight Research Center (formerly the Dryden Flight Research Center) in California. NASA received three two-seat F/A-18B aircraft in 2018. On 21 September 2012, two NASA F/A-18s escorted a NASA Boeing 747 Shuttle Carrier Aircraft carrying the Space Shuttle Endeavour over portions of California to Los Angeles International Airport before being delivered to the California Science Center museum in Los Angeles.

==== Combat operations ====
The F/A-18 first saw combat action in April 1986, when VFA-131, VFA-132, VMFA-314, and VMFA-323 Hornets from USS Coral Sea flew suppression of enemy air defense (SEAD) missions against Libyan air defenses during Operation Prairie Fire and an attack on Benghazi as part of Operation El Dorado Canyon.

During the Gulf War of 1991, the Navy deployed 106 F/A-18A/C Hornets and Marine Corps deployed 84 F/A-18A/C/D Hornets. F/A-18 pilots were credited with two kills during the Gulf War, both MiG-21s. On 17 January, the first day of the war, U.S. Navy pilots Lieutenant Commander Mark I. Fox and, Lieutenant Nick Mongilio were in a flight of four Hornets when they were sent from USS Saratoga in the Red Sea to bomb airfield H-3 in southwestern Iraq. While en route, they were warned by an E-2C of approaching "Bandits" or Iraqi MiG-21 aircraft. The Hornets shot down the two MiGs with AIM-7 and AIM-9 missiles in a brief dogfight. Only 40 seconds were needed from when the bandits appeared on the E-2's radar until both aircraft were downed. The F/A-18s, each carrying four 2,000 lb (910 kg) bombs, then resumed their bombing run before returning to Saratoga.

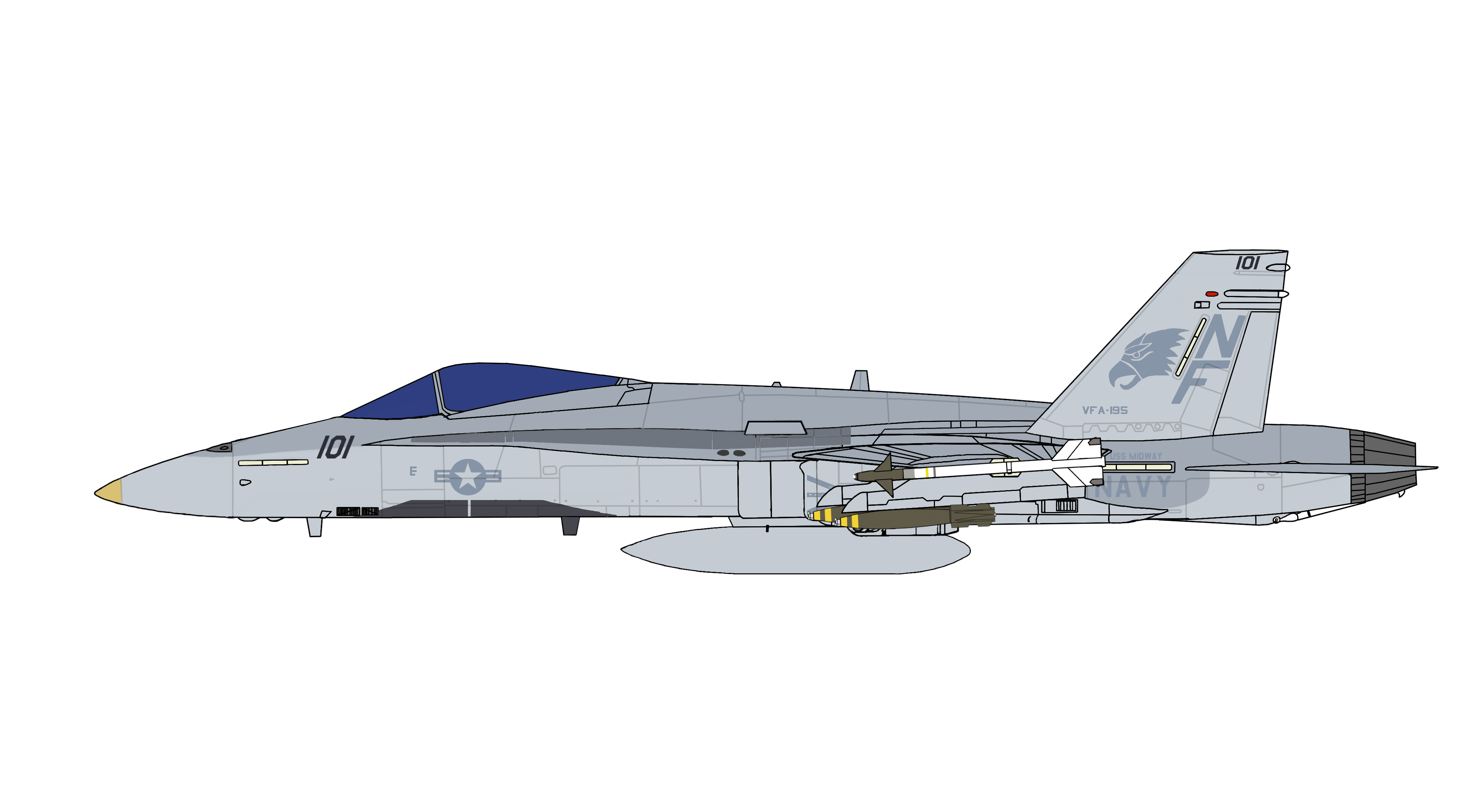
NF101, an F/A-18A Hornet assigned to VFA-195 Dambusters aboard the USS Midway in the 1991 Gulf War

The Hornet's survivability was demonstrated when a Hornet took hits in both engines and flew 125 mi (201 km) back to base. It was repaired and flying within a few days. F/A-18s flew 4,551 sorties with 10 Hornets damaged including three losses, one confirmed lost to enemy fire. All three losses were U.S. Navy F/A-18s, with two of their pilots lost. On 17 January 1991, Lieutenant Commander Scott Speicher of VFA-81 was shot down and killed in the crash of his aircraft. An unclassified summary of a 2001 CIA report suggests that Speicher's aircraft was shot down by a missile fired from an Iraqi Air Force aircraft, most likely a MiG-25.

On 24 January 1991, F/A-18A bureau number 163121, from USS Theodore Roosevelt, piloted by Lt H.E. Overs, was lost due to an engine failure or loss of control over the Persian Gulf. The pilot ejected and was recovered by USS Wisconsin. On 5 February 1991, F/A-18A bureau number 163096, piloted by Lieutenant Robert Dwyer was lost over the North Persian Gulf after a successful mission to Iraq; he was officially listed as killed in action, body not recovered.

As the A-6 Intruder was retired in the 1990s, its role was filled by the F/A-18. The F/A-18 demonstrated its versatility and reliability during Operation Desert Storm, shooting down enemy fighters and subsequently bombing enemy targets with the same aircraft on the same mission. It broke records for tactical aircraft in availability, reliability, and maintainability.

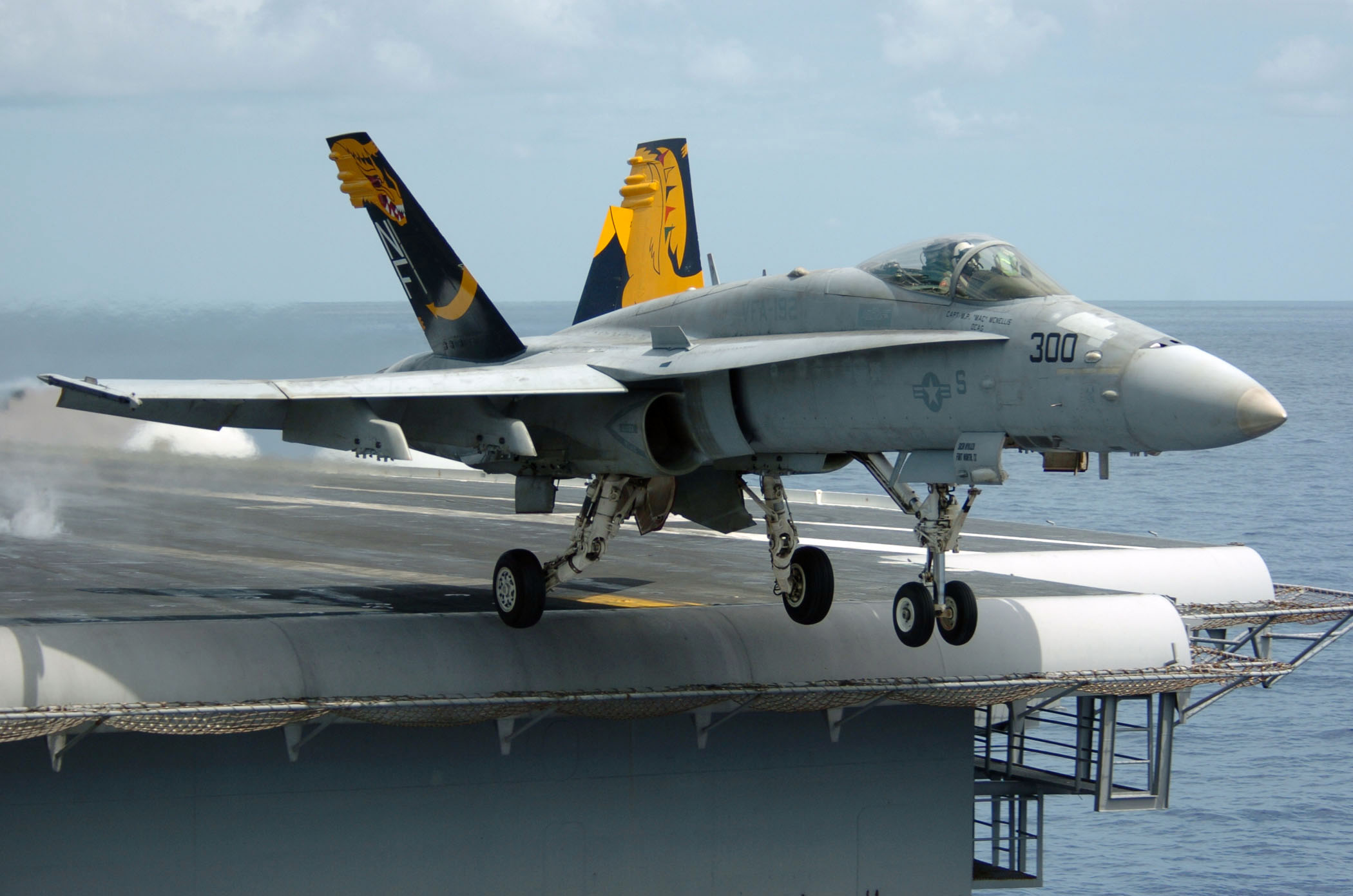
F/A-18C of VFA-192 taking off from USS Kitty Hawk in 2005

Both U.S. Navy F/A-18A/C models and Marine F/A-18A/C/D models were used continuously in Operation Southern Watch and over Bosnia and Kosovo in the 1990s. U.S. Navy Hornets flew during Operation Enduring Freedom in 2001 from carriers operating in the North Arabian Sea. Both the F/A-18A/C and newer F/A-18E/F variants were used during Operation Iraqi Freedom in 2003, operating from aircraft carriers as well from an air base in Kuwait. Later in the conflict USMC A+, C, and primarily D models operated from bases within Iraq.

An F/A-18C was accidentally downed in a friendly fire incident by a Patriot missile when a pilot tried to evade two missiles fired at his plane and crashed. Two others collided over Iraq in May 2005.

The last operational deployment of the F/A-18C Hornet in U.S. Navy service was aboard the USS Carl Vinson and ended on 12 March 2018. The aircraft briefly went back to sea for routine carrier qualifications in October, but it was retired from active Navy service on 1 February 2019. The type continued to be used by reserve units, primarily for adversary training. The actual final Navy F/A-18C operational flight occurred on 2 October 2019.

As of 2024, The United States Marine Corps operated a fleet of 179 F/A-18C and D Hornets, with plans to keep them operational with upgraded radars and electronics until 2030, when they are scheduled to be fully replaced by the Lockheed Martin F-35 Lightning II.

On 25 March 2026, during the ongoing 2026 Iran war, Iran’s Islamic Revolutionary Guard Corps (IRGC) claimed to have shot down a U.S. F-18 near Chabahar in Sistan and Baluchestan province. However, the U.S. Central Command (CENTCOM) formally rejected this claim, calling it "false" and stating no U.S. aircraft were downed. Iranian state media, including Press TV, released alleged video footage on 25-26 March 2026, showing an aircraft being struck, claiming it was an F-18 hit by a new "advanced air defense network". Neutral source suggest that the F-18 was hit but was not shot down. It is not clear whether it was a U.S. Marine F/A-18 Hornet or a U.S. Navy F/A-18 Super Hornet.

=== Non-U.S. service ===
The F/A-18 has been purchased and is in operation with several foreign air services. Export Hornets are typically similar to U.S. models of a similar manufacture date. Since none of the customers operate aircraft carriers, all export models have been sold without the automatic carrier landing system, and the Royal Australian Air Force further removed the catapult attachment on the nose gear. Except for Canada, all export customers purchased their Hornets through the U.S. Navy, via the U.S. Foreign Military Sales program, where the Navy acts as the purchasing manager, but incurs no financial gain or loss. Canada is the largest Hornet operator outside of the U.S.

==== Australia ====
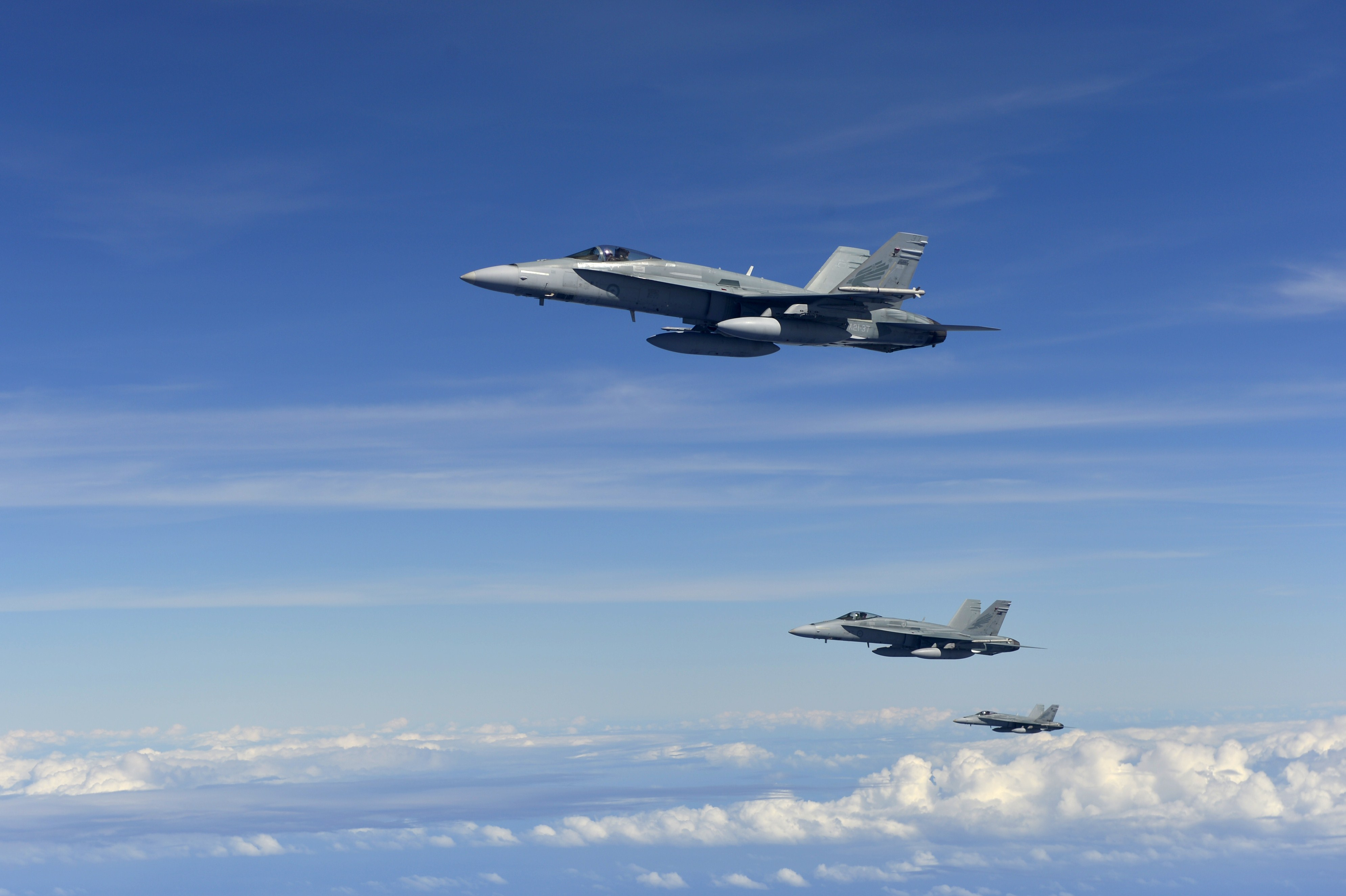
Three RAAF F/A-18As in 2013

From the late 1970s, the Australian government sought a replacement for the Dassault Mirage IIIO then operated by Royal Australian Air Force (RAAF) fighter squadrons. Numerous options were considered for the replacement, notably the F-15A Eagle, the F-16 Fighting Falcon, and the then new F/A-18 Hornet. The F-15 was discounted because the version offered had no ground-attack capability. The F-16 was considered unsuitable largely due to having only one engine.

The F/A-18 was officially chosen in October 1981. The RAAF was to receive 57 F/A-18A fighters and 18 F/A-18B two-seat trainers. Initial differences between the Australian and U.S. Navy's F/A-18 were the removed nose-wheel tie bar for catapult launch (later re-fitted with a dummy version to remove nose wheel shimmy), addition of a high frequency radio, an Australian fatigue data analysis system, an improved video and voice recorder, and the use of instrument landing system/VHF omnidirectional range instead of the carrier landing system.

Two aircraft were completed in the US, while the remainder were assembled in Australia at Government Aircraft Factories. F/A-18 deliveries to the RAAF began on 29 October 1984, and continued until May 1990. The fleet was upgraded beginning in the late 1990s to extend their service lives to 2015.

In 2001, Australia deployed four aircraft to Diego Garcia, in an air-defense role, during coalition operations against the Taliban in Afghanistan. In 2003, 75 Squadron deployed 14 F/A-18s to Qatar as part of Operation Falconer and these aircraft saw action during the invasion of Iraq. Australia had 71 Hornets in service in 2006, after four were lost to crashes.

By 2007, it was anticipated the "classic Hornets" would be replaced by the F-35 Lightning II, beginning in 2015. Some of the Australian Hornets subsequently had refits applied to extend their service lives out further to a new planned retirement date of 2020. Australia has also purchased 24 F/A-18F Super Hornets, with deliveries beginning in 2010.

In March 2015, six F/A-18As from No. 75 Squadron were deployed to the Middle East as part of Operation Okra, replacing a detachment of Super Hornets.

Australia has sold 25 F/A-18A/Bs to Canada with first two delivered to RCAF in February 2019. By 2021, 12 (A)F/A-18A and 6 (A)F/A-18B (and an additional 7 disassembled (A)F/A-18 for spare parts) were sold to the RCAF.

At Wings Over Illawarra 2021, the Hornet performed its last public flying display before retirement. Australia formally retired the Hornet at RAAF Base Williamtown on 29 November 2021. On 30 November 2021, No. 75 Squadron RAAF flew 7 of the last Hornets from RAAF Base Tindal to RAAF Base Williamtown. On 3 December 2021, the last Hornet left RAAF Base Tindal for decommissioning. Due to inclement weather, the Hornet diverted to RAAF Base Townsville and concluded the final RAAF Hornet flight to RAAF Base Williamtown on 4 December 2021.

==== Canada ====
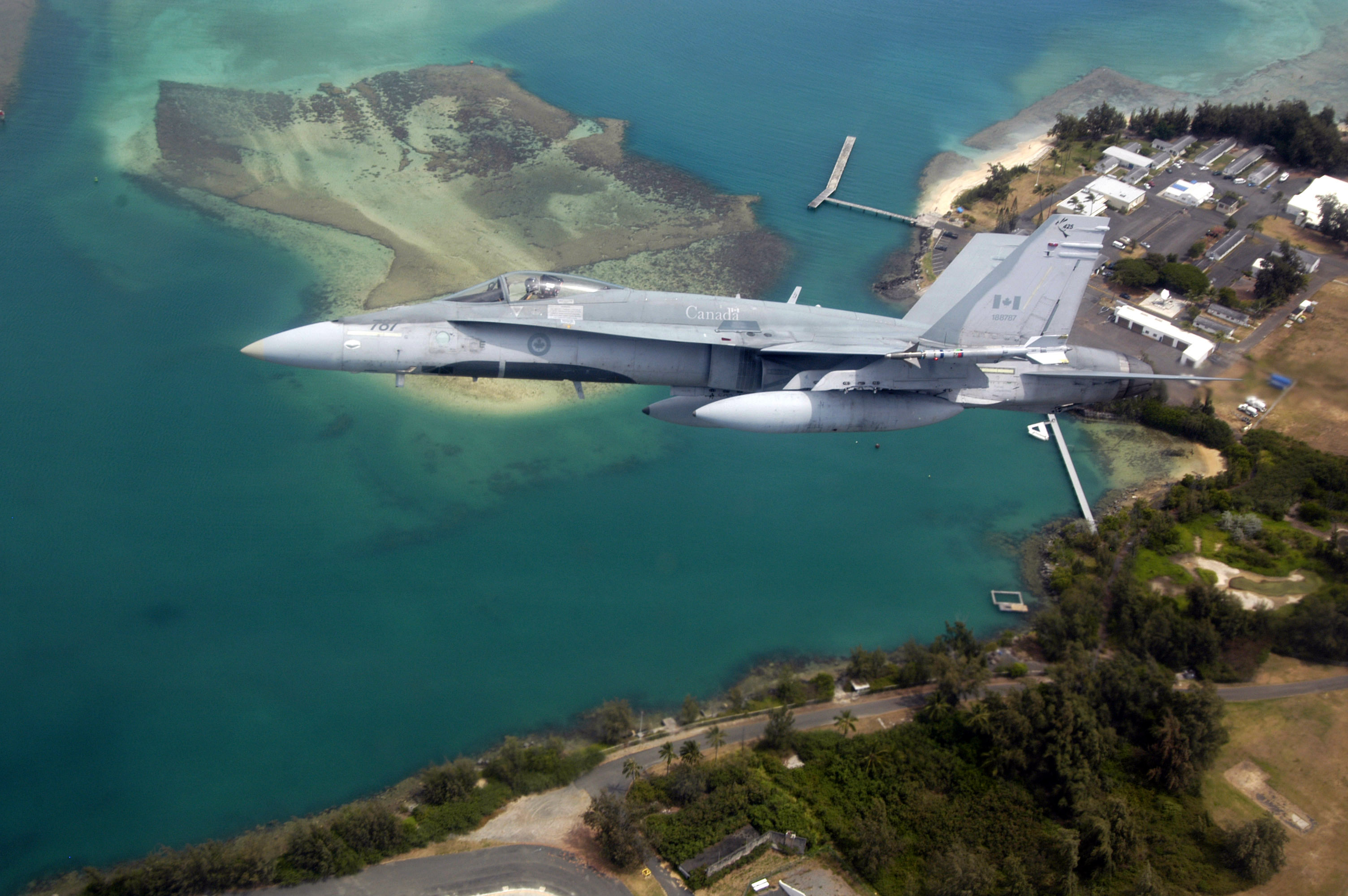
Canadian CF-188A Hornet off Hawaii. Note the "false cockpit" on the underside of the aircraft for confusing enemy pilots during dogfights.

Canada was the first export customer for the Hornet, replacing the Canadair CF-104 Starfighter (air reconnaissance and strike), the McDonnell CF-101 Voodoo (air interception) and the Canadair CF-116 Freedom Fighter (ground attack). The Canadian Forces Air Command ordered 98 A models (Canadian designation CF-188A/CF-18A) and 40 B models (designation CF-188B/CF-18B). The original CF-18 as delivered was nearly identical to the F/A-18A and B models. Many features that made the F/A-18 suitable for naval carrier operations were retained by the Canadian Forces, such as the robust landing gear, the arrestor hook, and wing folding mechanisms.

In 1991, Canada committed 26 CF-18s to the Gulf War, based in Qatar. These aircraft primarily provided Combat Air Patrol duties, although, late in the air war, began to perform air strikes on Iraqi ground targets. On 30 January 1991, two CF-18s on CAP detected and attacked an Iraqi TNC-45 patrol boat. The vessel was repeatedly strafed and damaged by 20mm cannon fire, but an attempt to sink the ship with an air-to-air missile failed. The ship was subsequently sunk by American aircraft, but the Canadian CF-18s received partial credit for its destruction.

In June 1999, 18 CF-18s were deployed to Aviano AB, Italy, where they participated in both the air-to-ground and air-to-air roles in the former Yugoslavia.

62 CF-18A and 18 CF-18B aircraft took part in the Incremental Modernization Project which was completed in two phases. The program was launched in 2001 and the last updated aircraft was delivered in March 2010. The aims were to improve air-to-air and air-to-ground combat abilities, upgrade sensors and the defensive suite, and replace the datalinks and communications systems on board the CF-18 from the F/A-18A and F/A-18B standard to the current F/A-18C and F/A-18D standard.

In July 2010 the Canadian government announced plans to replace the remaining CF-18 fleet with 65 F-35 Lightning IIs, with deliveries scheduled to start in 2016. In November 2016, Canada announced plans to buy 18 Super Hornets as an interim solution while reviewing its F-35 order. The plan for Super Hornets was later, in October 2017, put on hold due to a trade conflict with the U.S. over the Bombardier C-Series. Instead, Canada was seeking to purchase surplus Hornets from Australia or Kuwait. Canada has since acquired 25 ex-Australian F/A-18A/Bs, the first two of which were delivered in February 2019. 18 of these airframes will be introduced into active service with the remaining 7 to be used for spare parts and testing.

==== Finland ====
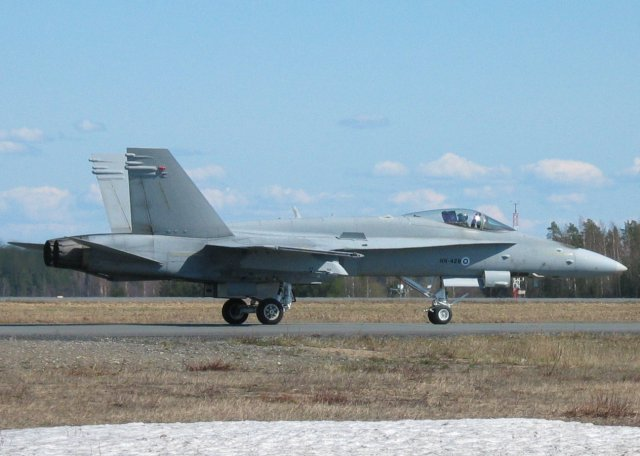
Finnish Air Force F/A-18 at Rissala Airport

The Finnish Air Force ordered 64 F-18C/Ds (57 C models, seven D models) in 1992. The F-18Ds were built at St. Louis, while the F-18Cs were locally assembled in Finland. Delivery of the aircraft started in November 1995 and ended in August 2000. The Hornet replaced the MiG-21bis and Saab 35 Draken in Finnish service. The Finnish Hornets were initially to be used only for air defense, hence the F-18 designation. The F-18C includes the ASPJ (Airborne Self-Protection Jammer) jamming pod ALQ-165. The U.S. Navy later included the ALQ-165 on their F/A-18E/F Super Hornet procurement.

One Hornet was destroyed in a mid-air collision in 2001. A damaged F-18C, nicknamed "Frankenhornet", was rebuilt into a F-18D using the forward section of a Canadian CF-18B that was purchased. The modified fighter crashed during a test flight in January 2010, due to a faulty tailplane servo cylinder. A third Hornet crashed in Rovaniemi during flight show training in May 2025.

The Finnish Air Force's Hornet fleet went through a two-stage Mid-Life Upgrade (MLU) program. From 2006 to 2010, the MLU 1 stage was aimed at improving the aircraft's air-to-air capabilities. It included the integration of the new AIM-9X Sidewinder missile together with the JHMCS helmet-mounted sight, new radios, a new IFF interrogator, and a new moving map display. Then, from 2012 to 2016, the MLU 2 stage was mainly focused at enabling the aircraft to use standoff air-to-ground weapons, including the JDAM, JSOW and JASSM. The Hornets also received the Litening targeting pod. New chaff/flare dispensers were installed. The cockpit was modernized, and Link 16 was added. The upgrade also includes the procurement and integration of a new version of the AIM-120 AMRAAM air-to-air missile. In total, 62 aircraft (the whole Finnish Hornet fleet as of 2016) were modernized to MLU 2 standards. Since this upgrade gave the plane a ground-attack capability, the Finnish Air Force also started to refer to the plane as "F/A-18" rather than just "F-18".

With a service life of 30 years, the Hornets are to remain in active service until 2025–2030. In October 2014, the Finnish national broadcaster Yle announced that consideration was being given to the replacement of the Hornet. In 2015, Finland started the HX Fighter Program that aims to acquire new multirole fighters to replace the current Hornet fleet. On 10 December 2021, the Finnish government announced the selection of Lockheed Martin's fifth-generation F-35A Lightning II for its HX Fighter Program. The first Hornet, HN-401, was retired on 26 April 2024.

==== Kuwait ====
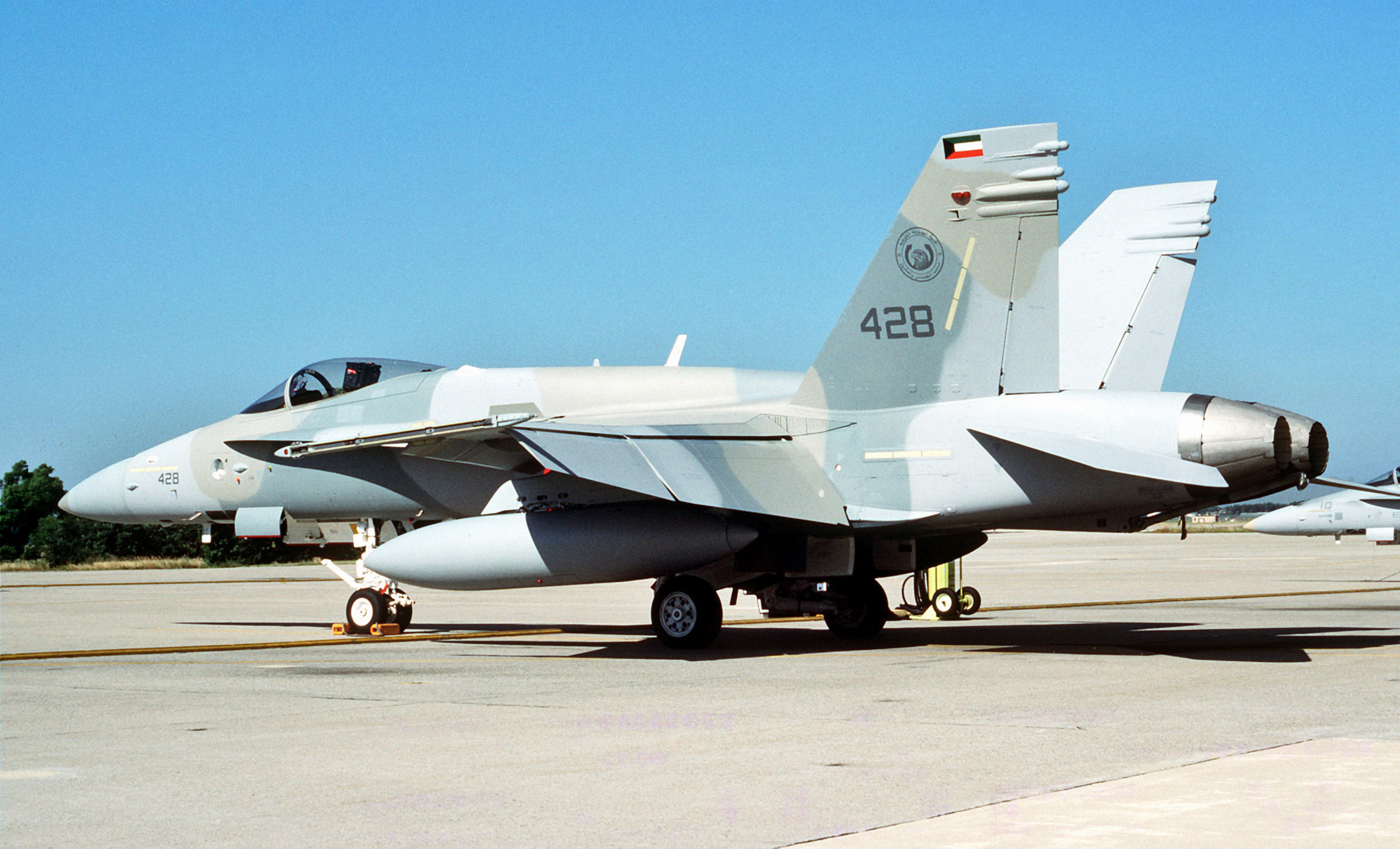
An F/A-18 of the Kuwaiti Air Force

The Kuwait Air Force (Al Quwwat Aj Jawwaiya Al Kuwaitiya) ordered 32 F/A-18C and eight F/A-18D Hornets in 1988. Delivery started in October 1991 until August 1993. The F/A-18C/Ds replaced A-4KU Skyhawk and Mirage F1CK-2. Kuwait Air Force Hornets have flown missions over Iraq during Operation Southern Watch in the 1990s. They have also participated in military exercises with the air forces of other Gulf nations. Kuwait had 39 F/A-18C/D Hornets in service in 2008. Kuwait also participated in the Yemeni Civil War (2015–present). In February 2017, the Commander of the Kuwait Air Force revealed that the F/A-18s based at King Khalid Air Base had performed approximately 3,000 sorties over Yemen. During the 2026 Iranian missile strikes in Kuwait, a Kuwaiti F/A-18 shot down three American F-15Es in a case of friendly fire. All six pilots ejected and survived.

==== Malaysia ====
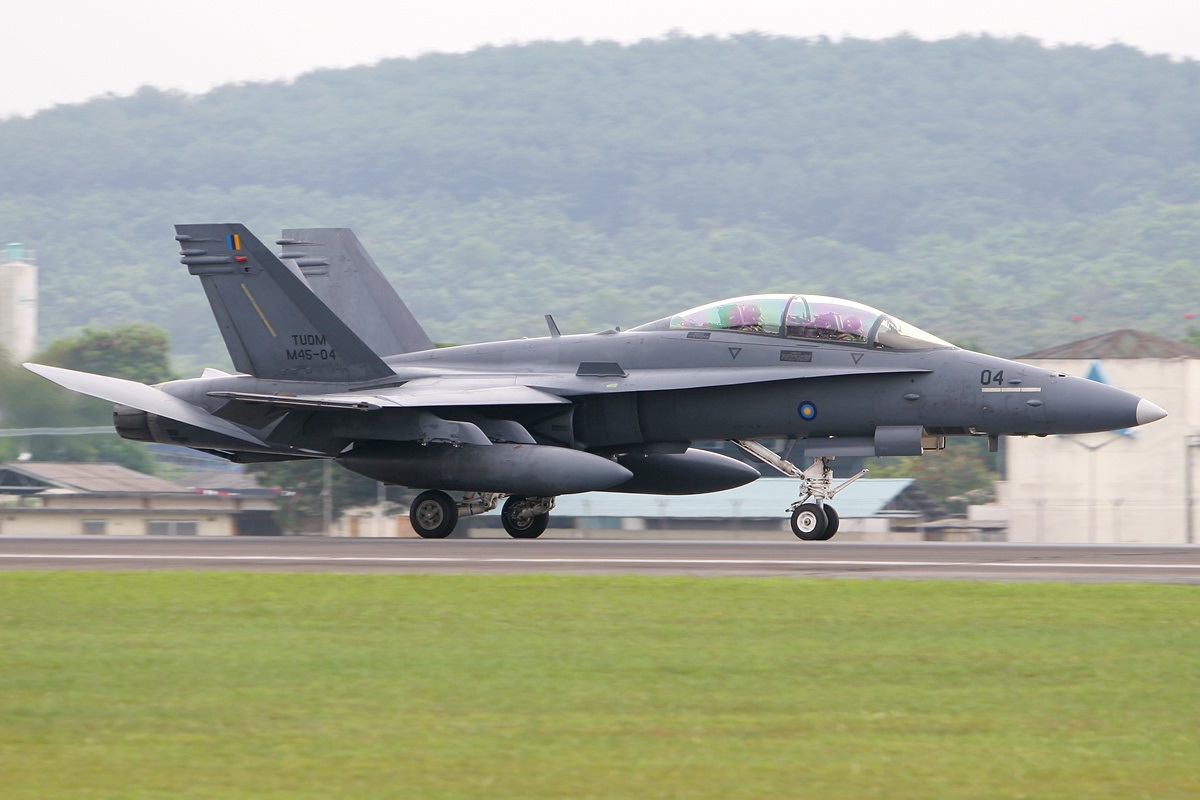
Royal Malaysian Air Force F/A-18D returning to base after a national day flypast

The Royal Malaysian Air Force (Tentera Udara Diraja Malaysia) has eight F/A-18Ds. Delivery of the aircraft occurred from March to August 1997.

Three Hornets together with five UK-made BAE Hawk 208 were deployed in a bombing airstrike on the "Royal Security Forces of the Sultanate of Sulu and North Borneo" terrorists on 5 March 2013, just before the joint forces of the Malaysian Army and Royal Malaysia Police commandos launched an all-out assault during Operation Daulat. The Hornets were tasked with close air support to the no-fly zone in Lahad Datu, Sabah.

As of July 2024, Malaysia intends to acquire Kuwaiti legacy F/A-18s as the Kuwaiti Air Force replaces their Hornets with newer Super Hornets and Eurofighter Typhoons. The United States has granted clearance for Kuwaiti F/A-18s to be exported to Malaysia in June 2025. The RMAF was set to receive around 30 F/A-18C/Ds. A team of eight RMAF personnel was sent to the Ahmad al-Jaber Air Base in November 2025 to evaluate the Kuwaiti aircraft. Malaysia formally cancelled the Kuwaiti F/A-18s procurement in February 2026 due to delays of their projected delivery and operational timeline, and uncertainty of their maintenance and support arrangements in the future.

==== Spain ====
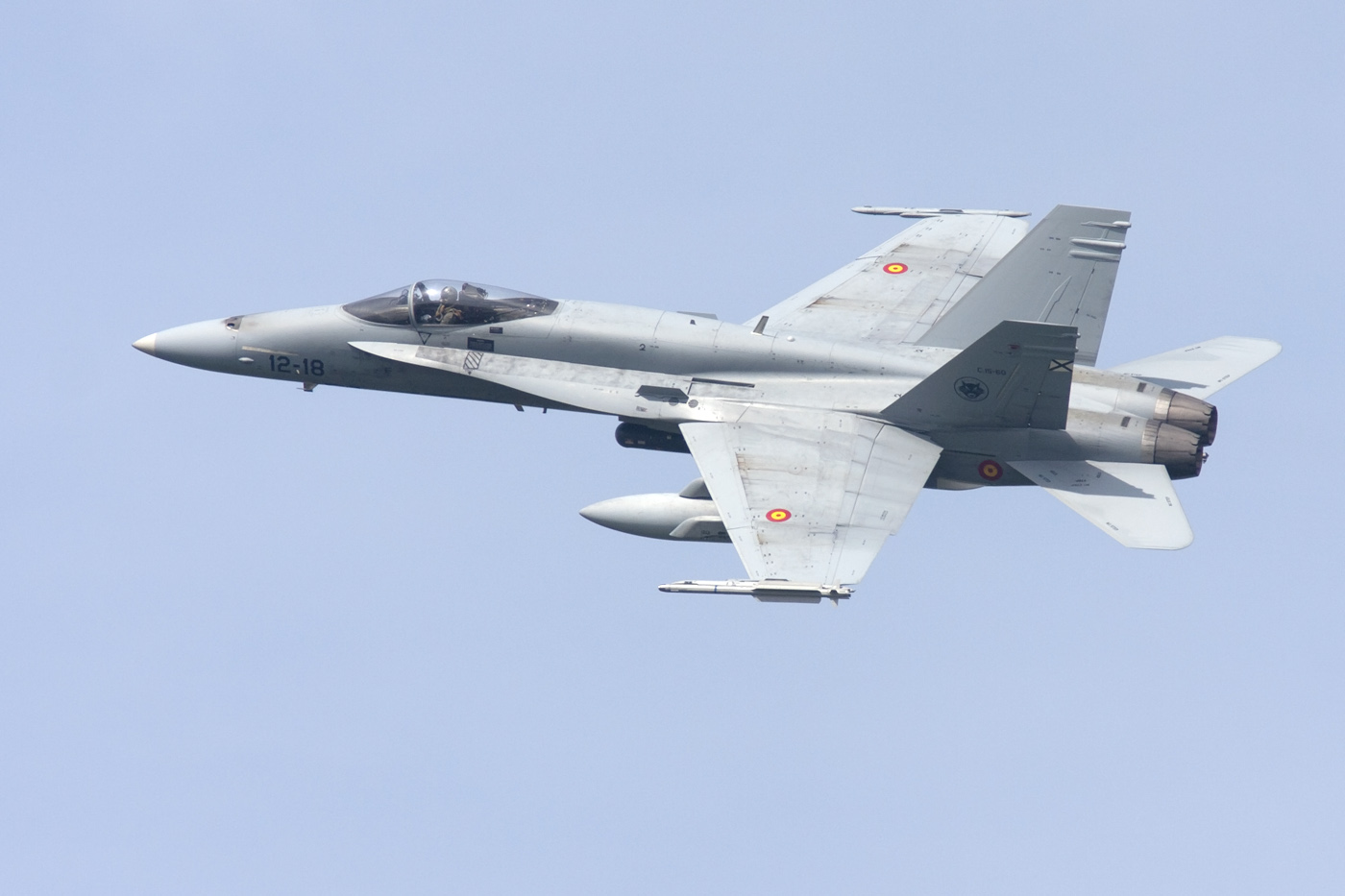
EF-18A taking off and banking to the left in 2015

The Spanish Air and Space Force (Ejército del Aire y del Espacio) ordered 60 EF-18A model and 12 EF-18B model Hornets (the "E" standing for "España", Spain), named respectively as C.15 and CE.15 by Spain (the “C” standing for “Caza”, Fighter). The Spanish version was delivered from 22 November 1985 to July 1990. These fighters were upgraded to F-18A+/B+ standard, close to F/A-18C/D (plus version includes later mission and armament computers, databuses, data-storage set, new wiring, pylon modifications and software, new abilities as AN/AAS-38B NITE Hawk targeting FLIR pods).

In 1995 Spain obtained 24 ex-USN F/A-18A Hornets, with six more on option. These were delivered from December 1995 until December 1998. Before delivery, they were modified to EF-18A+ standard. This was the first sale of USN surplus Hornets.

Spanish Hornets operate as an all-weather interceptor 60% of the time and as an all-weather day/night attack aircraft for the remainder. In case of war, each of the frontline squadrons would take a primary role: 121 is tasked with tactical air support and maritime operations; 151 and 122 are assigned to all-weather interception and air combat roles; and 152 is assigned the Suppression of Enemy Air Defenses (SEAD) mission. Air refueling is provided by KC-130Hs and Boeing 707TTs. Pilot conversion to EF-18 is centralized in 153 Squadron (Ala 15). Squadron 462's role is air defense of the Canary Islands, being responsible for fighter and attack missions from Gando AB.

Spanish Air Force EF-18 Hornets have flown Ground Attack, SEAD, combat air patrol (CAP) combat missions in Bosnia and Kosovo, under NATO command, in Aviano detachment (Italy). They shared the base with Canadian and USMC F/A-18s. Six Spanish Hornets had been lost in accidents by 2003. On 25 May 1995, while taking part of Operation Deny Flight, Spanish EF-18s armed with laser-guided bombs and supported by US F-16s destroyed an ammunition depot at Pale, a Bosnian Serb stronghold in the outskirts of Sarajevo.

Over Yugoslavia, eight EF-18s, based at Aviano AB, participated in bombing raids in Operation Allied Force in 1999, being among the first planes to strike Yugoslav targets. Over Bosnia, they also performed missions for air-to-air combat air patrol, close air support air-to-ground, photo reconnaissance, forward air controller-airborne, and tactical air controller-airborne. Over Libya, four Spanish Hornets participated in enforcing a no-fly zone.

==== Switzerland ====
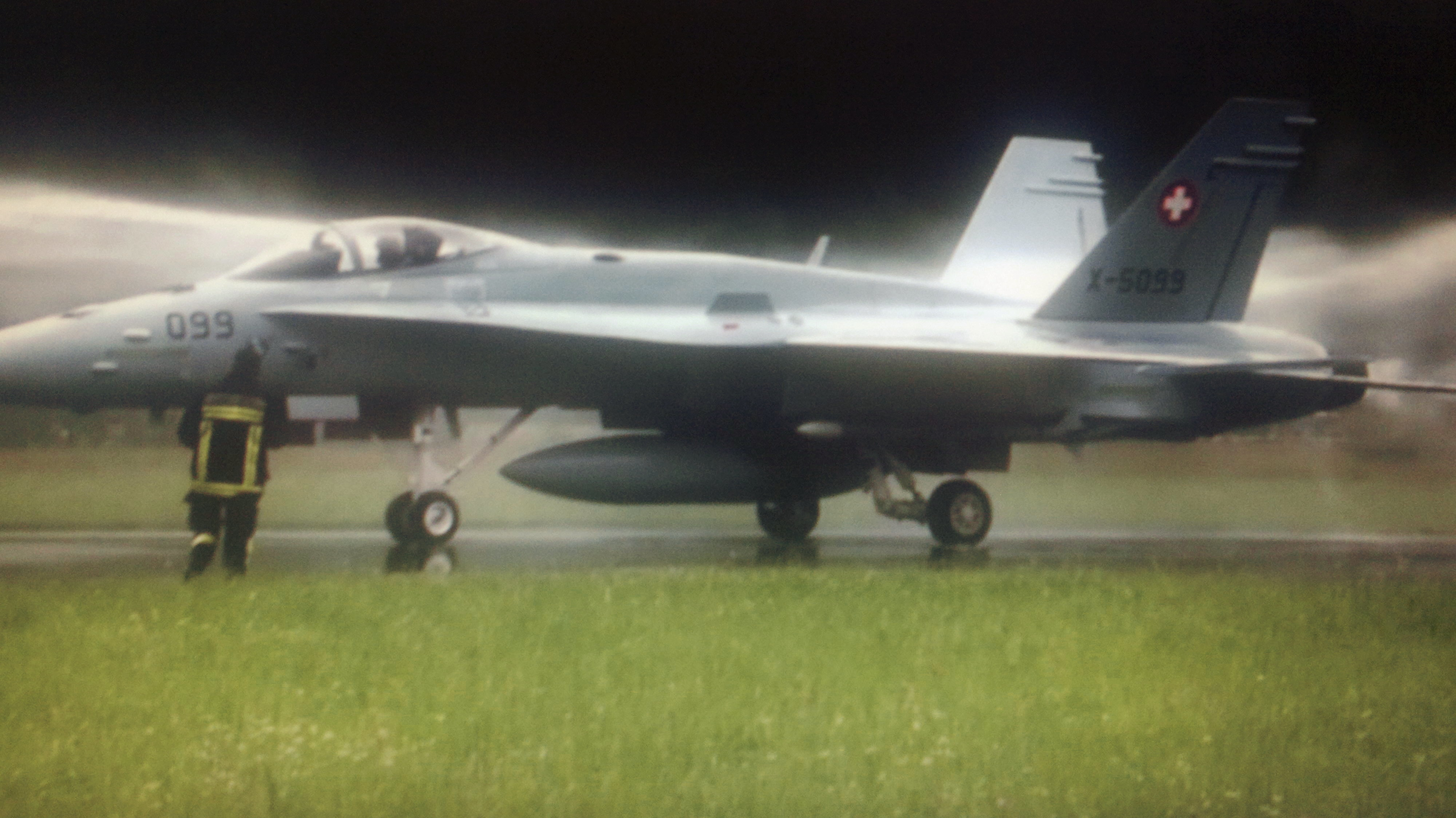
Hugo Wolf F/A-18C full-scale training simulator, X-5099

The Swiss Air Force purchased 26 C models and eight D models, they were delivered from January 1996 to December 1999. Three D models and one C model had been lost in crashes as of 2016. On 14 October 2015, an F/A-18D crashed in France during training with two Swiss Air Force Northrop F-5s in the Swiss/French training area EURAC25; the pilot ejected safely.

During late 2007, Switzerland requested to be included in the F/A-18C/D Upgrade 25 Program, to extend the useful life of its F/A-18C/Ds. The program includes significant upgrades to the avionics and mission computer, 12 ATFLIR surveillance and targeting pods, and 44 sets of Raytheon AN/ALR-67(V)3 Advanced Special Receiver ECM equipment. In October 2008, the Swiss Hornet fleet reached the 50,000 flight hour milestone.

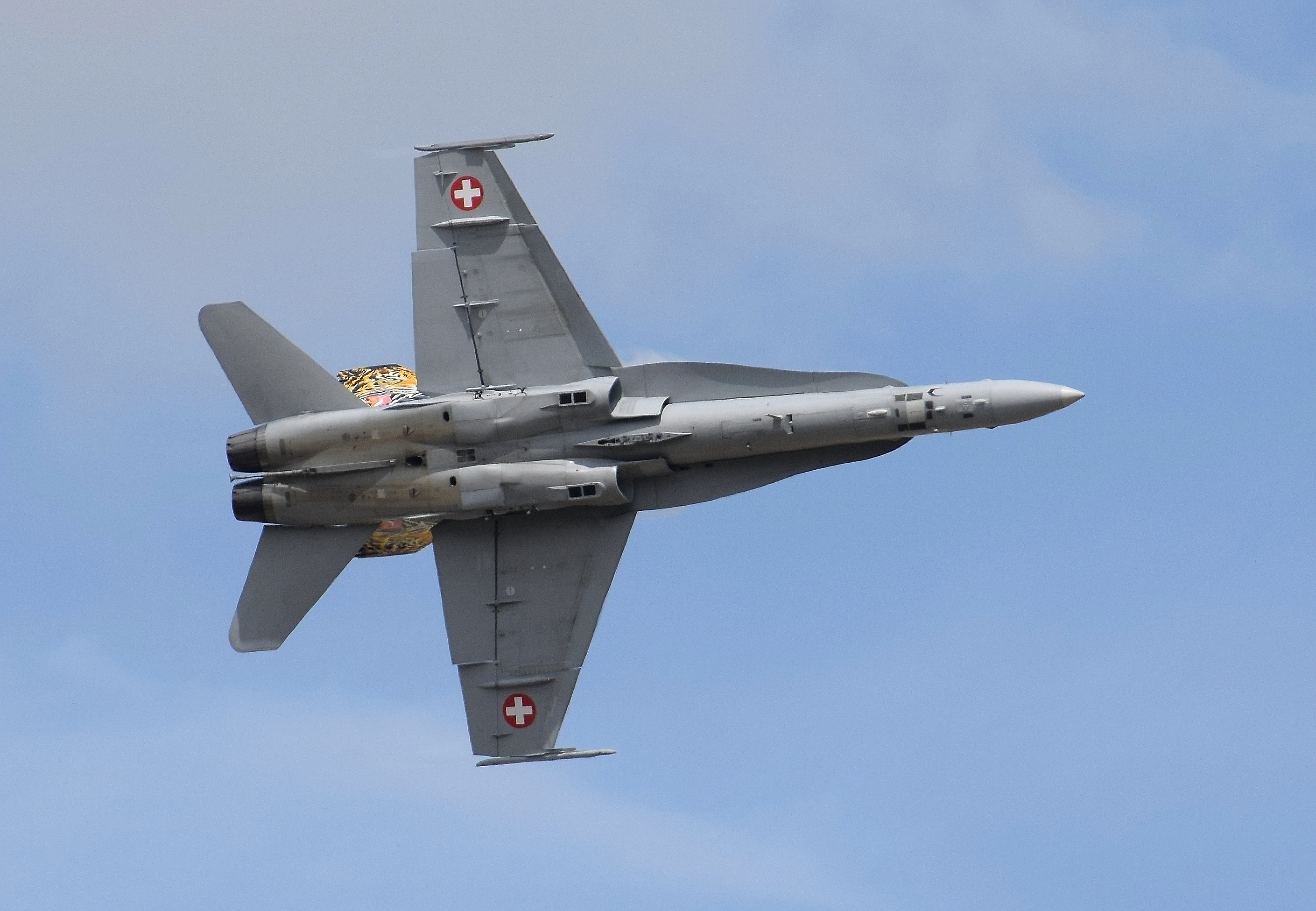
Swiss Air Force Hornet F/A-18C at RIAT 2019

The Swiss Air Force has also taken delivery of two F/A-18C full-scale mock-ups for use as ground crew interactive training simulators. Locally built by Hugo Wolf AG, they are externally accurate copies and have been registered as Boeing F/A-18C (Hugo Wolf) aircraft with tail numbers X-5098 and X-5099. These include a complex equipment fit, including many original cockpit components and instruments, allowing the simulation of fires, fuel leaks, nosewheel collapse and other emergency scenarios. X-5098 is permanently stationed at Payerne Air Base while X-5099, the first one built, is moved between air bases according to training demands.

=== Potential operators ===
In June 2023, the Financial Review reported that Australia, the United States and Ukraine were negotiating the supply of 41 Australian F/A-18 Hornet fighter jets to the Ukrainian Air Force. A further update was issued in December 2023, that the U.S. have continued talks with the Australian government and have begun exploring the option of providing aging jets and parts from the Finnish Air Force.

During December 2023 Ukraine asked the US, according to documents viewed by Reuters, for F/A-18 Hornets. The Ukrainian ambassador to Australia is expected to again request surplus Hornets. A report found that 14 of the 41 airframes were airworthy and another two years flying could be "squeezed" from them.

=== Failed bids ===
Several Nations considered operating the hornet at various points in time. The F/A-18C and F/A-18D were considered by the French Navy (Marine Nationale) during the 1980s for deployment on their aircraft carriers Clemenceau and Foch and again in the 1990s for the later nuclear-powered Charles de Gaulle, in the event that the Dassault Rafale M was not brought into service when originally planned.

Austria, Chile, Czech Republic, Hungary, Philippines, Poland, and Singapore evaluated the Hornet but did not purchase it.

The Imperial Iranian Air Force, as part of its large modernization plans in the 1970s, originally considered the YF-17 but - after the F-16 was chosen by the original NATO partners - chose to buy 160 F-16s. However, after the Navy's request for a naval YF-17, the Shah expressed interest once more in the program and in the end about 200 to 250 F-18Ls were considered with delivery planned for the early to mid 1980s. An additional $8 million was used for research and development into the F/A-18 program.

South Korea originally set out with an ambitious plan to build 120 new fighter jets through its Korean Fighter Program. Although the F/A-18 Hornet was first selected, complications with the deal led to a change in direction. Instead, the country opted for the F-16C/D Block 52D, known locally as the KF-16C/D, with 72 of the jets to be built domestically in South Korea.

Thailand ordered four C and four D model Hornets in 1995–1996 for $392 million, with plans for ten additional Hornets. Thailand already paid $74.5 million deposit before the Asian financial crisis in late 1990s hit the country, which resulted in the order being canceled in April 1998. The eight Hornets were completed as F/A-18Ds for the U.S. Marine Corps.

The F/A-18A and F-18L land-based version competed for a fighter contract from Greece in the 1980s. The Greek government chose F-16 and Mirage 2000 instead.

== Variants ==
=== F/A-18A/B Hornet ===
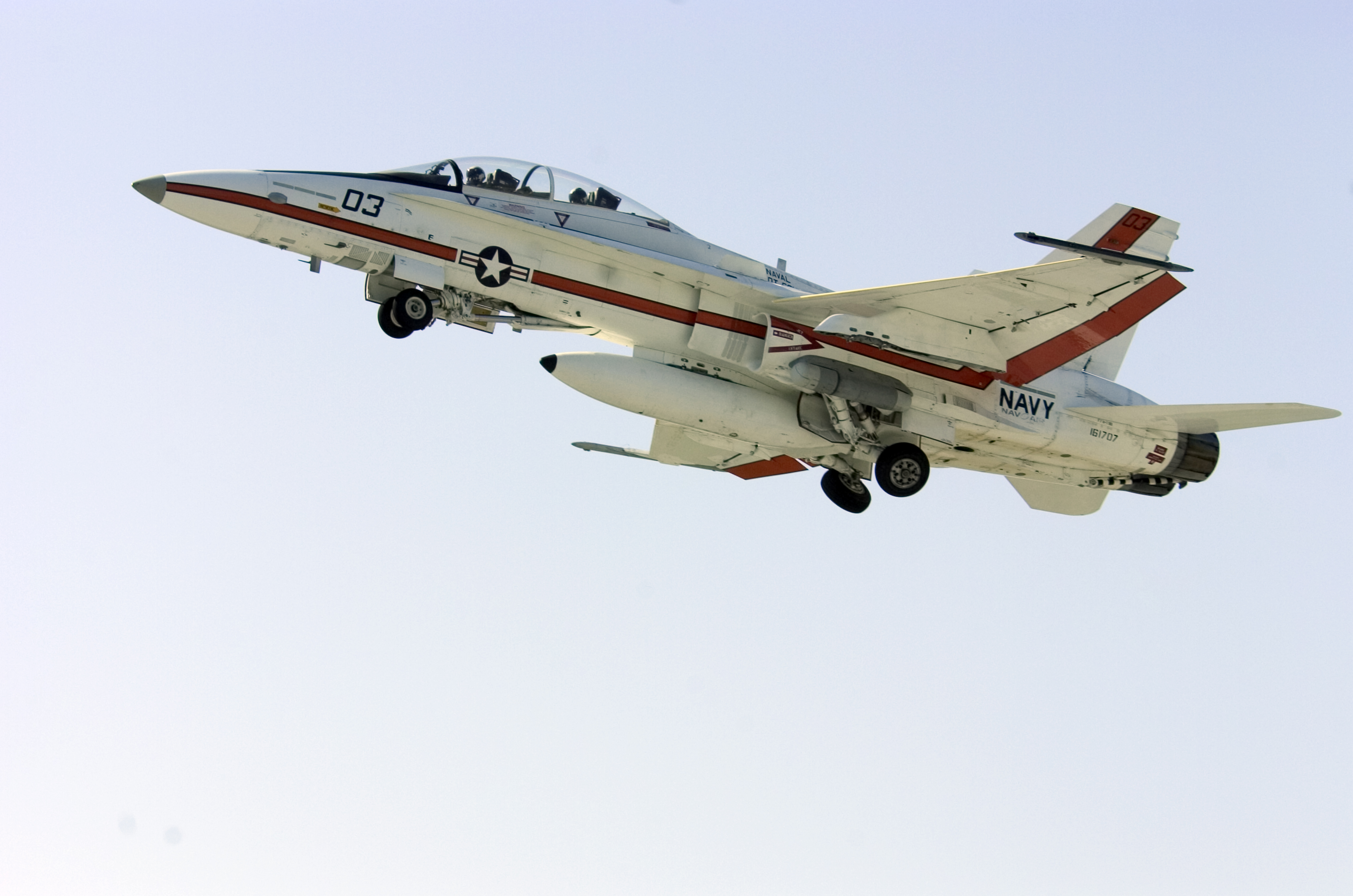
An F/A-18B Hornet assigned to the U.S. Naval Test Pilot School

The F/A-18A, single-seat variant, can employ the AGM-84 Harpoon, AGM-65E Maverick, AGM-88 HARM and the AGM-62 Walleye I/II. The F/A-18A was also equipped with the AN/AAS-38 Nite Hawk targeting pod and the AN/ASQ-173 laser detector tracker strike camera pod for targeting. During the Gulf War, there were limited numbers of the Nite Hawk for USN and USMC Hornets. The F/A-18B has space for the two-seat cockpit, provided by a relocation of avionics equipment and a 6% reduction in internal fuel. Two-seat Hornets are otherwise fully combat-capable. The B-model is used primarily for training.

In 1992, the original Hughes AN/APG-65 radar was replaced with the Hughes (now Raytheon) AN/APG-73, a faster and more capable radar. A-model Hornets that have been upgraded to the AN/APG-73 and are capable of carrying the AIM-120 AMRAAM are designated F/A-18A+. Later in the 2010s they received life-extending upgrades from the USMC and then became F/A-18A++.

=== F/A-18C/D Hornet ===
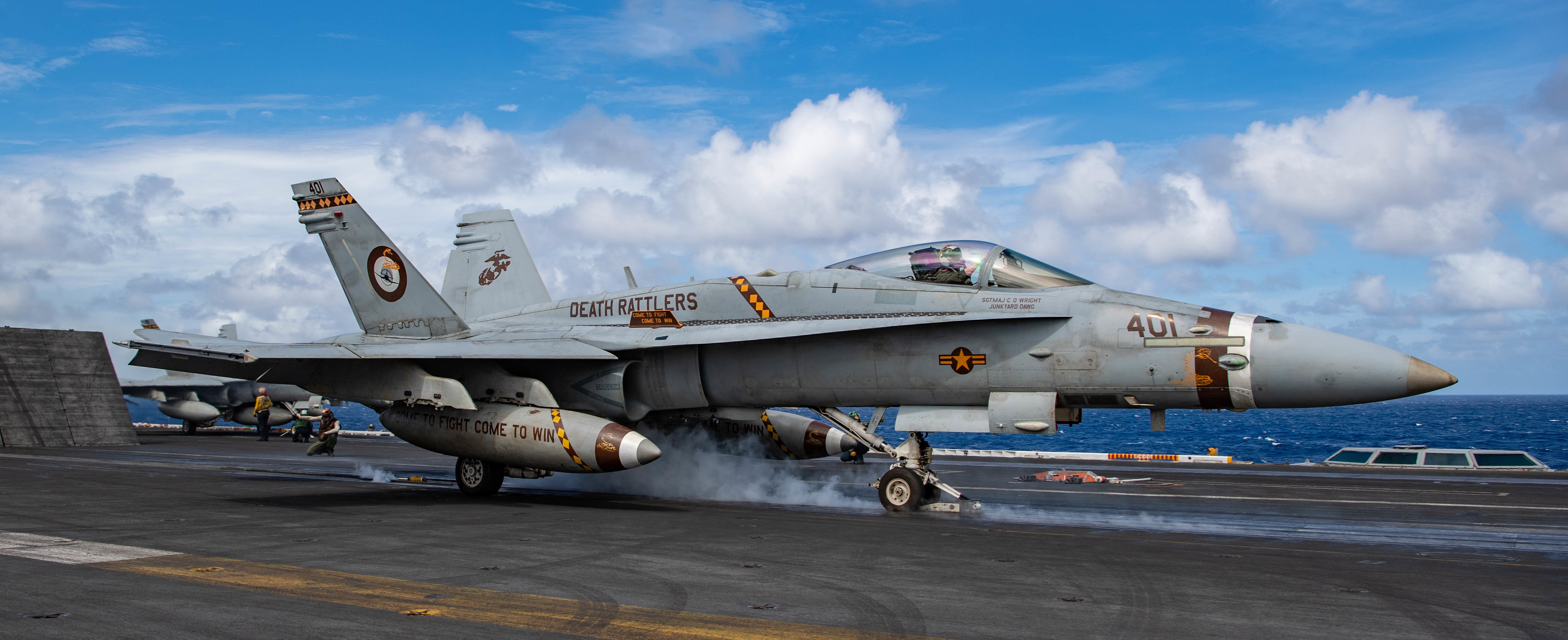
A U.S. Marine Corps F/A-18C of VMFA-323, launches off the flight deck of the USS Nimitz in 2021

The F/A-18C and D models are the result of a block upgrade in 1987 incorporating upgraded radar, avionics, and the capacity to carry new missiles such as the AIM-120 AMRAAM air-to-air missile and later on the AGM-84E SLAM as well as the IR version of the AGM-65 (AGM-65F). Other upgrades include the Martin-Baker NACES (Navy Aircrew Common ejection seat), and a self-protection jammer. A synthetic aperture ground mapping radar enables the pilot to locate targets in poor visibility conditions. C and D models delivered since 1989 also have improved night attack abilities, consisting of the Hughes AN/AAR-50 thermal navigation pod, AN/AAS-38A NITE Hawk FLIR (forward looking infrared array) targeting pod, night vision goggles, and two full-color (formerly monochrome) multi-function display (MFDs) and a color moving map.

The F/A-18C is the single-seat variant and the F/A-18D is the two-seat variant. The D-model can be configured for training or as an all-weather strike craft. The "missionized" D model's rear seat is configured for a Marine Corps naval flight officer who functions as a Weapons and Sensors Officer to assist in operating the weapons systems. The F/A-18D is primarily operated by the U.S. Marine Corps in the night attack and Forward Air Controller (Airborne) (FAC(A)) roles.

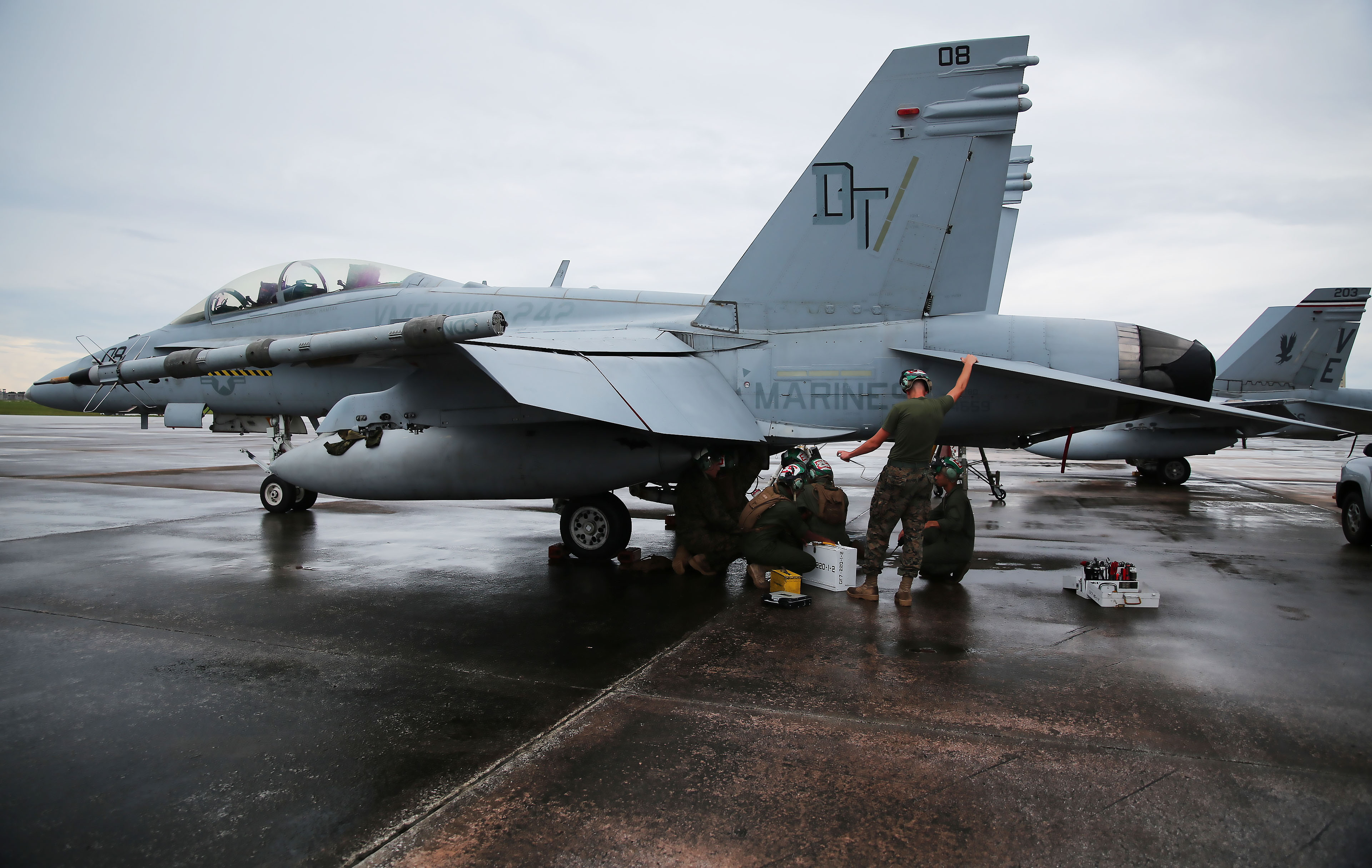
U.S. Marines perform maintenance on an F/A-18D of VMFA-242 at Andersen Air Force Base

Sixty D-model Hornets are configured as the night attack F/A-18D (RC) with the ability for reconnaissance. These could be outfitted with the ATARS electro-optical sensor package that includes a sensor pod and equipment mounted in the place of the M61 cannon.

Beginning in 1992, the F404-GE-402 enhanced performance engine, providing approximately 10% more maximum static thrust became the standard Hornet engine. Since 1993, the AAS-38A NITE Hawk added a designator/ranger laser, allowing it to self-mark targets. The later AAS-38B added the ability to strike targets designated by lasers from other aircraft without having to mount a separate laser spot tracking pod.

The U.S. Navy retired its F/A-18C/D in February 2019. However, the USMC still retains theirs, and is in the process of upgrading their radar to APG-79(V)4 Active Electronically Scanned Array radar system. This variant for the USMC with the MLU is called F/A-18C+. These are F/A-18Cs of the Blocks 25 and 30 that are being modernized to the most modern Block 35 and for a longer service life.

=== F/A-18E/F Super Hornet ===
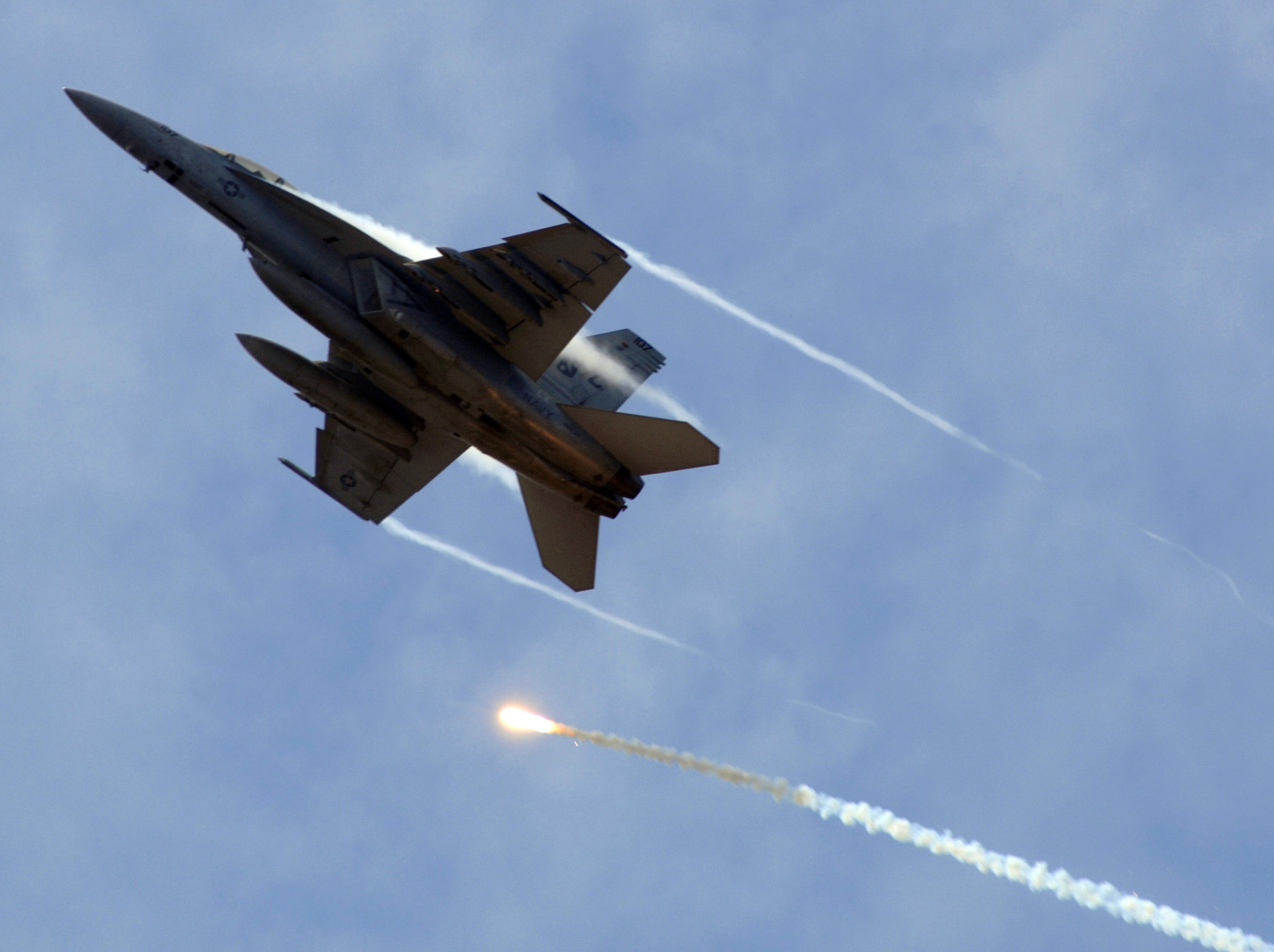
A VFA-11 F/A-18F Super Hornet performing evasive maneuvers during an air power demonstration above USS Harry S. Truman

The single-seat F/A-18E and two-seat F/A-18F, both officially named Super Hornet, carry over the name and design concept of the original F/A-18 but have been extensively redesigned by McDonnell Douglas. The Super Hornet, which began production in 1995, has a new, 25% larger airframe, larger rectangular air intakes, more powerful GE F414 engines based on F/A-18's F404, and an upgraded avionics suite. Like the Marine Corps' F/A-18D, the Navy's F/A-18F carries a naval flight officer as a second crew member in a weapon systems officer role. The Super Hornet is unofficially known as "Rhino" in operational use. This name was chosen to distinguish the newer variants from the legacy F-18A/B/C/D Hornet and avoid confusion during carrier deck operations. The Super Hornet is also operated by Australia and Kuwait.

=== EA-18G Growler ===
The EA-18G Growler is an electronic warfare version of the two-seat F/A-18F, which entered production in 2007. The Growler has replaced the Navy's EA-6B Prowler and carries a Naval Flight Officer as a second crewman in an Electronic Warfare Officer (EWO) role. Growlers are used by the United States and Australia.

=== US variants list ===
F/A-18A
Original single-seat version, can carry the AGM-84 ASM, AGM-62 Walleye, AGM-88 HARM and the TV guided versions AGM-65 Maverick.
F/A-18B
Two-seat version of the F/A-18A, combat capable but mainly used for training.
F/A-18C
Improved version of the F/A-18A, can carry the AIM-120 AMRAAM, AGM-84E SLAM and the IR guided versions AGM-65 Maverick.
F/A-18D
Two-seat version of the F/A-18C, used only by USMC.
F/A-18E
Most modern version of the F/A-18, has a larger airframe, more powerful engines, and a better avionics suite compared to the F/A-18C.
F/A-18F
Two-seat version of the F/A-18E.
F-18(R)
This was a proposed reconnaissance version of the F/A-18A. It included a sensor package that replaced the 20 mm cannon. The first of two prototypes flew in August 1984. Small numbers were produced.
RF-18D
Proposed two-seat reconnaissance version for the U.S. Marine Corps in the mid-1980s. It was to carry a radar reconnaissance pod. The system was cancelled after it was unfunded in 1988. This ability was later realized on the F/A-18D(RC).
TF-18A
Two-seat training version of the F/A-18A fighter, later redesignated F/A-18B.

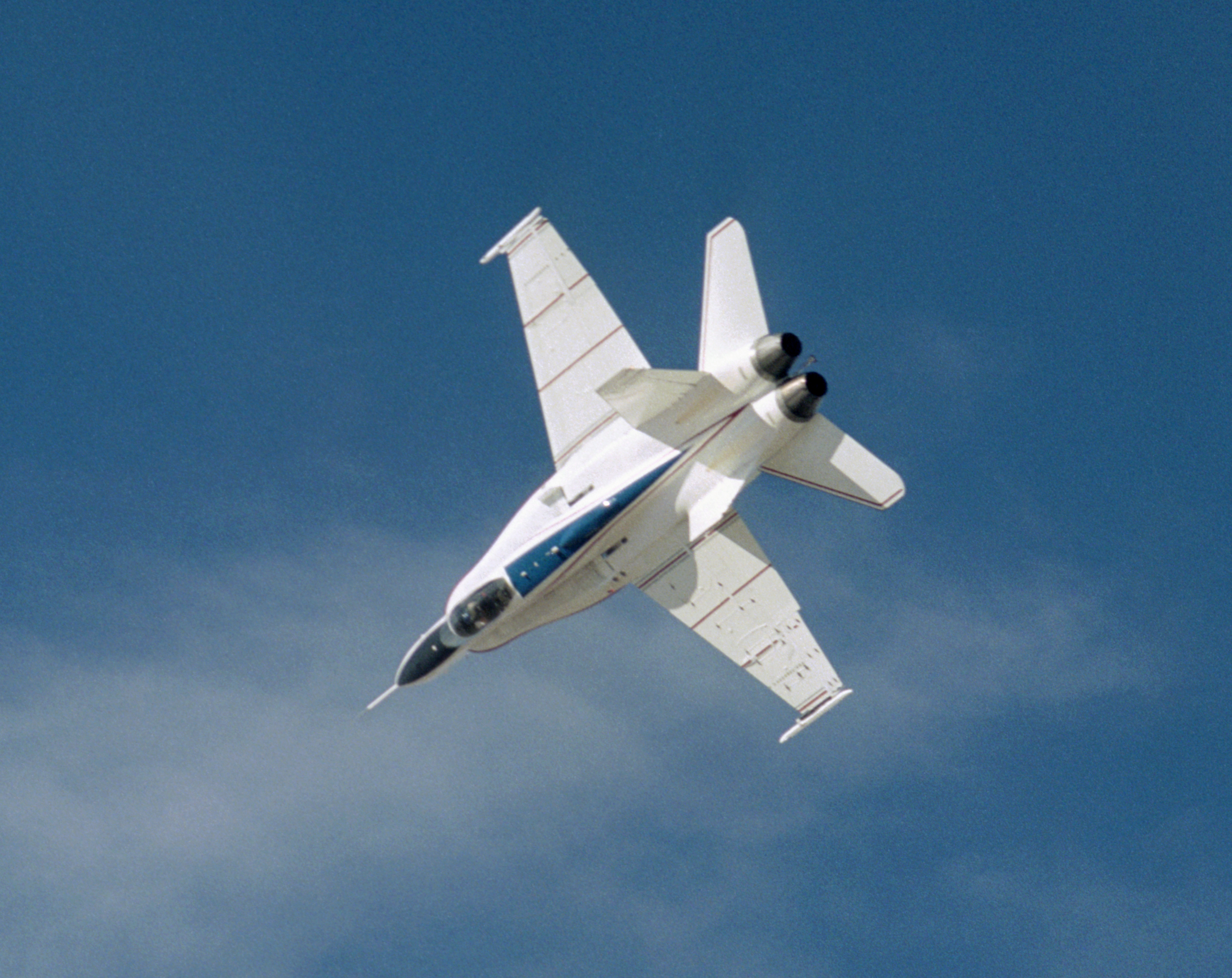
X-53, NASA's modified F/A-18

F-18 HARV
Single-seat High Alpha Research Vehicle for NASA. High angles of attack using thrust vectoring, modifications to the flight controls, and forebody strakes

X-53 Active Aeroelastic Wing
A NASA F/A-18 has been modified to demonstrate the Active Aeroelastic Wing technology, and was designated X-53 in December 2006.

=== Export variants ===
These designations are not part of 1962 United States Tri-Service aircraft designation system.

F-18L
A proposed land-based export version of the single-seat F-18A with air-superiority and attack capabilities. This variant was to be lightened by the removal of carrier landing capability and assembled by Northrop. Customers preferred the standard Hornet and the F-18L never entered mass production.

(A)F/A-18A/B

- (A)F/A-18A: Single-seat fighter/attack version for the Royal Australian Air Force.
- (A)F/A-18B: Two-seat training version for the Royal Australian Air Force.

"F/A-18A" was the original company designation, designations of "AF-18A" & "ATF-18A" have also been applied. Assembled in Australia (excluding the first two (A)F/A-18Bs) by Aero-Space Technologies of Australia (ASTA) from 1985 through to 1990, from kits produced by McDonnell Douglas with increasing local content in the later aircraft. Originally the most notable differences between an Australian (A)F/A-18A/B and a US F/A-18A/B were the lack of a catapult attachment, replacing the carrier tailhook with a lighter land arresting hook, and the automatic carrier landing system with an Instrument Landing System. Australian Hornets have been involved in several major upgrade programs. This program called HUG (Hornet Upgrade) has had a few evolutions over the years. The first was to give Australian Hornets F/A-18C model avionics. The second and current upgrade program (HUG 2.2) updates the fleet's avionics even further. By 2021 12 (A)F/A-18A and 6 (A)F/A-18B (and an additional 7 broken down (A)F/A-18 for spare parts) were sold to the Royal Canadian Air Force.

CF-188

- CF-188A: Single-seat fighter/attack version for the Canadian Armed Forces (CAF)/Royal Canadian Air Force (RCAF). Unofficially referred to as the CF-18A Hornet.
- CF-188B: Two-seat training and combat version for the CAF/RCAF. Unofficially referred to as the CF-18B Hornet.

EF-18 Hornet

- EF-18A: Single-seat fighter/attack version for the Spanish Air and Space Force, the E is for España (Spain in Spanish). The Spanish Air and Space Force designation is C.15, the C being for Caza (fighter aircraft in Spanish, lit. hunt). They were first upgraded to the EF-18A+ version in 1992, this included the pylons in the F/A-18C standard. The Spanish Air Force did not acquire licenses, but locally developed upgrades. From 2004 to 2013 they were locally upgraded by EADS CASA and Indra Sistemas in the Mid-life Upgrade (MLU) program, with better avionics, data buses, TPAC, data presentation (similar to the F/A-18C Hornet), navigation, communications (radios), software and ECM suit. The AN/APG-65 radar was upgraded to the V3 version and the aircraft also received the AL-400 Radar Warning Receiver and the ASQ-600 emission detector and were certified to operate with Iris-T, GBU-48 and Taurus. This also included a thorough structural and engine revision and overhaul, and a new paint job for a few units. This version is locally known as EF-18MLU/C.15M/EF-18M.
- EF-18B: Two-seat training version for the Spanish Air and Space Force. The Spanish Air and Space Force designation is CE.15. The E is for Entrenamiento, meaning training in Spanish. They were first upgraded to the EF-18B+ version in 1992. The MLU variant is called EF-18BM.

KAF-18 Hornet

- KAF-18C: Single-seat fighter/attack version for the Kuwait Air Force
- KAF-18D: Two-seat training version for the Kuwait Air Force

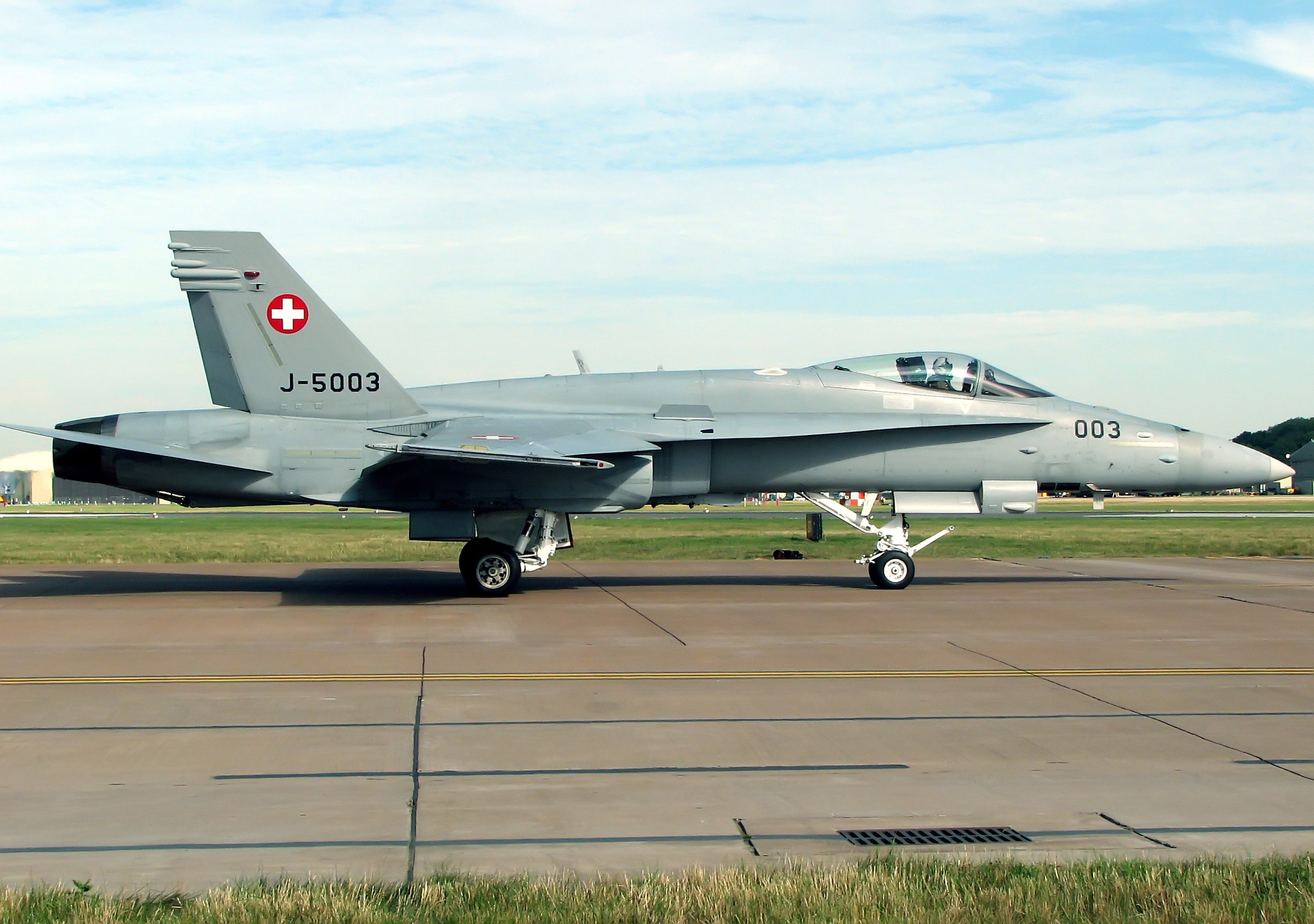
F/A-18C of the Swiss Air Force taxis for takeoff

F-18C/D Hornet

- The Finnish Air Force uses F/A-18C/D Hornets, with a Finland-specific mid-life update. The first seven Hornets (D models) were produced by McDonnell Douglas. The 57 single-seat F-18C model units were assembled by Patria in Finland. The letter A (meaning attack) was dropped from the name, because of a treaty with the Soviet union after WW2 stating that Finland is not allowed to have offensive weapons, though these aircraft still do have a air-to-ground capability. The Mid-Life Upgrade 2 (MLU 2) performed from 2012 to 2016 provided Finnish hornets with air-to-ground mission capability, allowing it to deploy air-to-ground weapons such as JDAMs, JSOWs and JASSMs, alongside avionics and air-to-air missile upgrades. Official Finnish sources now also use the F/A-18C/D designation.

F-18C/D Hornet

- Switzerland uses F-18C/D, later Swiss specific mid-life update. The Swiss F-18s had no ground attack capability originally, until hardware was retrofitted.

== Operators ==
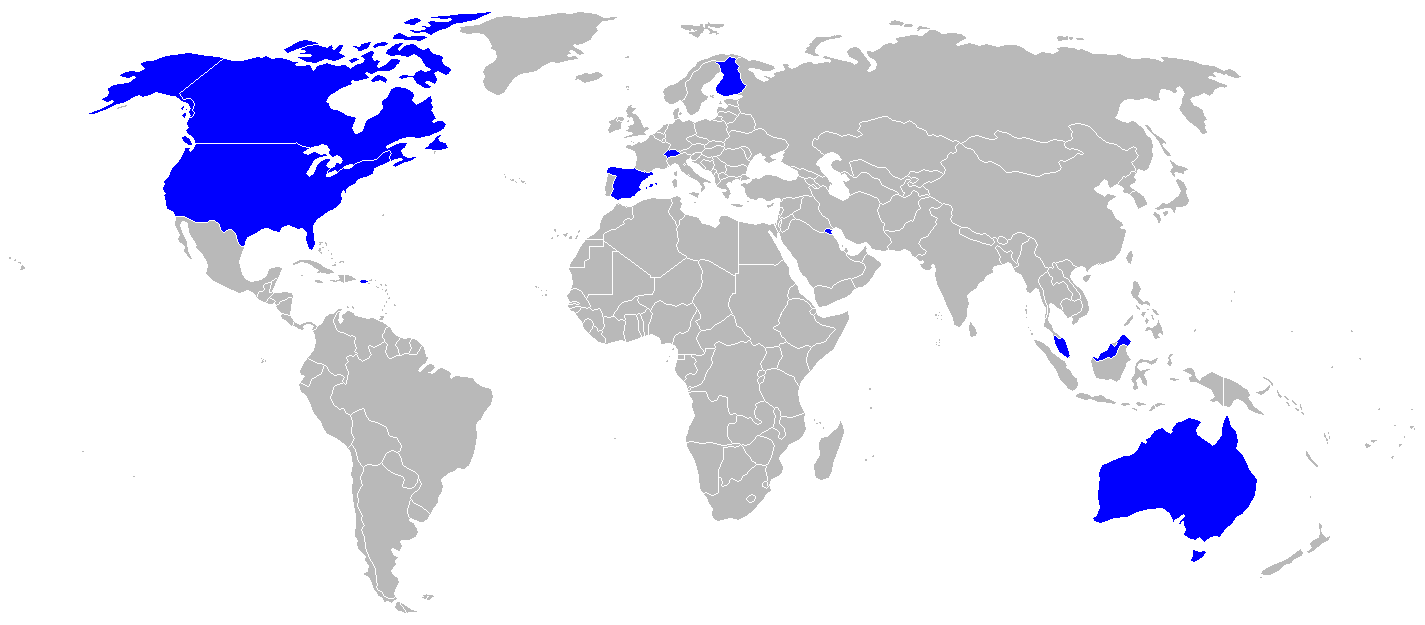
F/A-18 operators

Canada

- Royal Canadian Air Force (see McDonnell Douglas CF-18 Hornet)
  - 86 (63 CF-18A & 23 CF-18B) aircraft in use as of 2021.
  - 10 Ex-RAAF F/A-18A/B in use as of 2025.

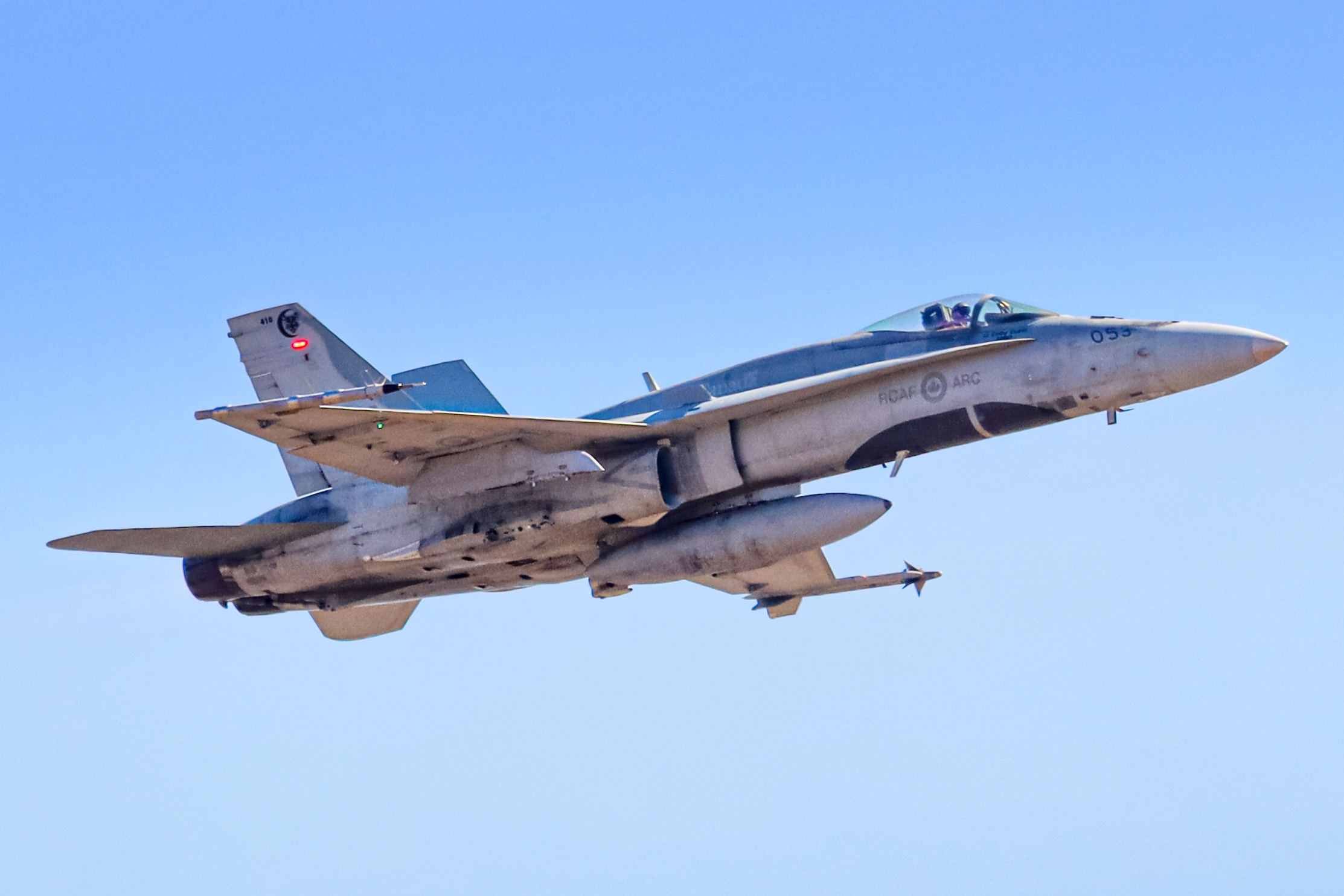
One of ten in service Ex-RAAF F-18 Hornet in RCAF

Finland

- Finnish Air Force - 53 F/A-18Cs and 7 F/A-18Ds in use as of 2025.
  - Karelia Air Wing
    - No. 31 Squadron
  - Lapland Air Wing
    - No. 11 Squadron

Kuwait

- Kuwait Air Force - 31 F/A-18Cs and 8 F/A-18Ds in service as of November 2008. 34 (27 F/A-18C & 7 F/A-18D) aircraft were in use as of 2021.
  - 9th Fighter and Attack Squadron
  - 25th Fighter and Attack Squadron

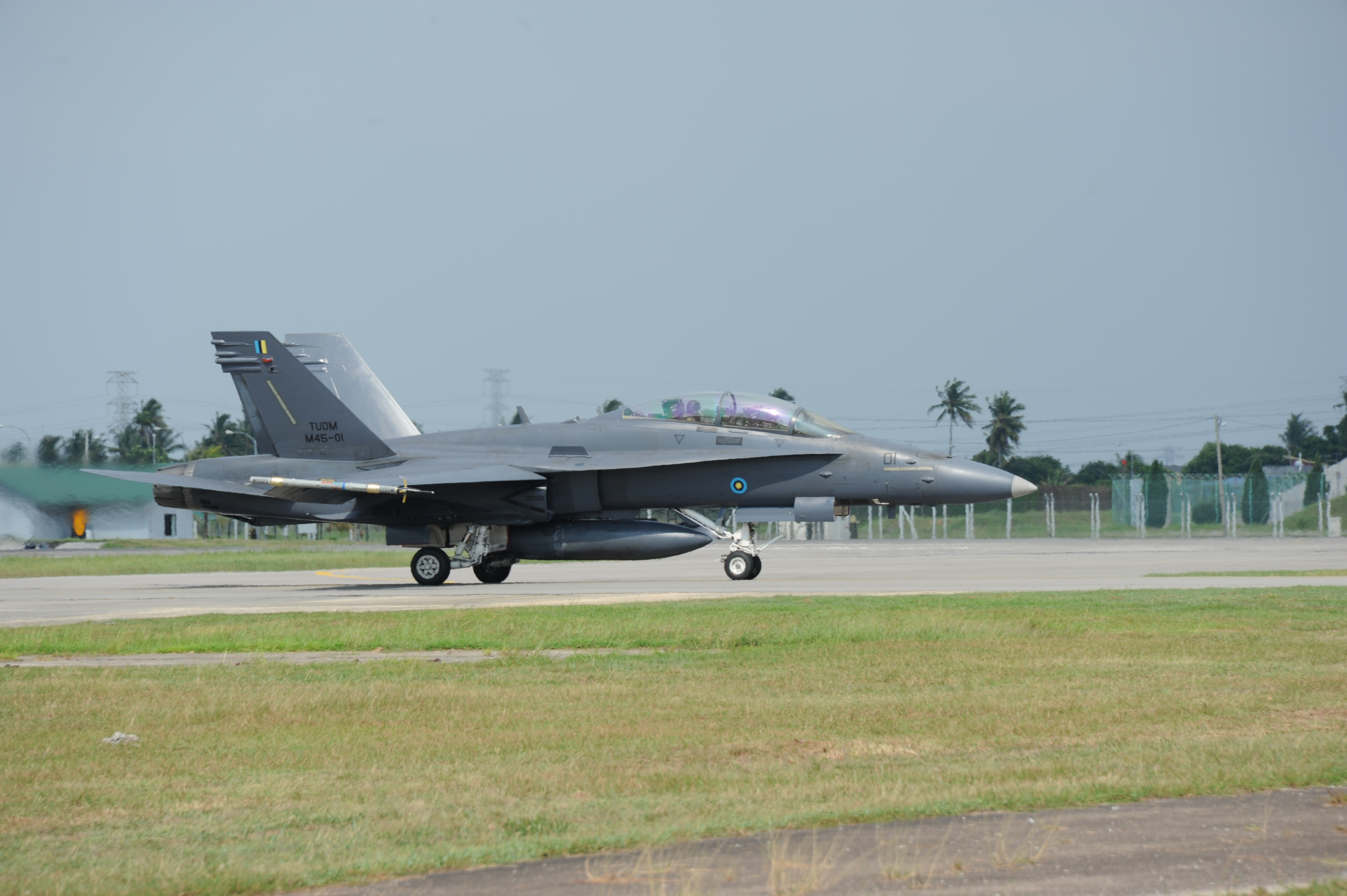
Royal Malaysian Air Force F/A-18D Hornet during Cope Taufan 2012

Malaysia

- Royal Malaysian Air Force - 7 F/A-18Ds in operation as of 2025. 1 crashed in 2025.
  - RMAF Butterworth
    - No. 18 Squadron

Spain

- Spanish Air and Space Force - 85 F/A-18A+/B+ in service. There were 84 (72 EF-18M and F/A-18C & 12 EF-18BM) aircraft in use as of 2021.
  - Ala de Caza 15 (15th Fighter Wing) Zaragoza AB, (151, 152 and 153 Squadrons)
  - Ala de Caza 12, Torrejón AB (121 and 122 Squadrons)
  - Ala 46, Gando AB (Canary Islands), with Squadron 462 operating 20 ex-U.S. Navy F/A-18As. They did not receive any important upgrades, unlike the Hornets operating from the Spanish mainland.

Switzerland

- Swiss Air Force - 25 F/A-18Cs and 5 F/A-18Ds in service as of 2021.
  - Fliegerstaffel 11
  - Fliegerstaffel 17
  - Fliegerstaffel 18

NASA video of an F/A-18A aerial refueling operation, documenting behavior of the drogue basket, 2002

United States

- United States Marine Corps Aviation 186 F/A-18A/B/C/D Hornets in operation as of 2023
  - VMFA-112 1992–present (Marine Air Reserve)
  - VMFA-232 1989–present
  - VMFA-312 1987–present
  - VMFA-323 1982–present
  - MAWTS-1 1990–present
- NASA's Armstrong Flight Research Center – 3 F/A-18s in use

=== Former operators ===
Australia

- Royal Australian Air Force
  - No. 3 Squadron RAAF 1985–2017 (converted to F-35A)
  - No. 75 Squadron RAAF 1988–2021 (converted to F-35A)
  - No. 77 Squadron RAAF 1985–2020 (converted to F-35A)
  - No. 2 Operational Conversion Unit RAAF 1985-2019 (converted to F-35A)
  - Aircraft Research and Development Unit

U.S. Navy F/A-18C from VFA-131 launches from French aircraft carrier Charles de Gaulle off the Virginia Capes

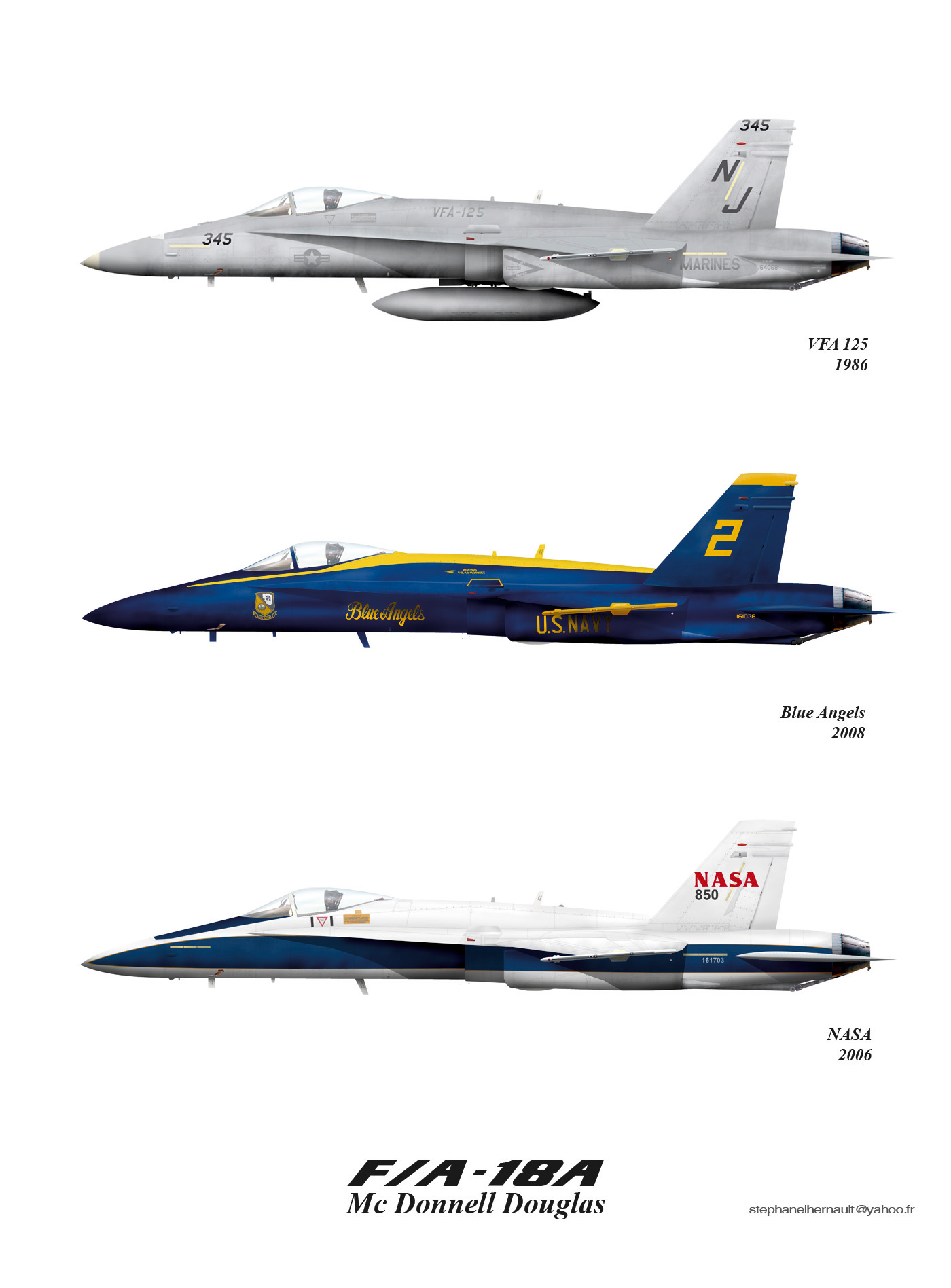
F/A-18A Hornets in various color schemes

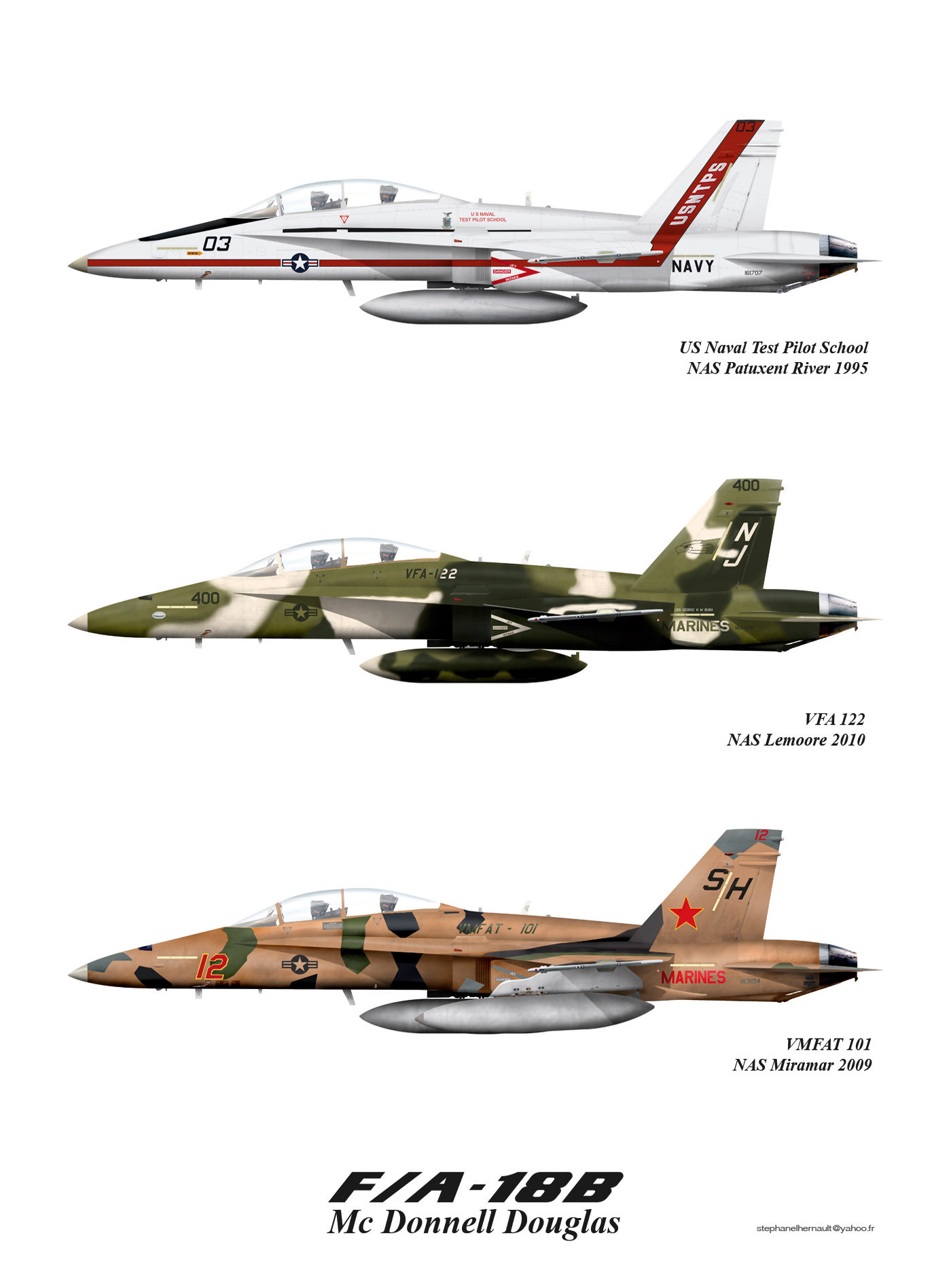
F/A-18B Hornets in various color schemes

United States

- United States Marine Corps
  - VMFA-115 1985–2023 (to convert to F-35C)
  - VMFA-122 1986–2017 (converted to F-35B)
  - VMFA-134 1989–2007 (Marine Corps Reserve; placed in cadre status)
  - VMFA-142 1990–2008 (Marine Corps Reserve; placed in cadre status)
  - VMFA-212 1988–2008 (disestablished)
  - VMFA-235 1989–1996 (disestablished)
  - VMFA-251 1987–2020 (to convert to F-35C)
  - VMFA-314 1982–2019 (converted to F-35C)
  - VMFA-321 1991–2004 (Marine Corps Reserve; disestablished)
  - VMFA-333 1987–1992 (disestablished)
  - VMFA-451 1987–1997 (re-designated to VMFAT-501 April 2010, converted to F-35B)
  - VMFA-531 1984–1992 (disestablished)
  - VMFA(AW)-121 1989–2012 (converted to F-35B)
  - VMFA(AW)-225 1991–2020 (converted to F-35B)
  - VMFA(AW)-242 1991–2020 (converted to F-35B)
  - VMFA(AW)-332 1993–2007 (disestablished)
  - VMFA(AW)-533 1992–2023 (converted to F-35B)
  - VMFAT-101 1987–2023 (disestablished)
- United States Navy
  - VFC-12 1990–2021 (Naval Air Reserve Force)
  - VFA-15 1986–2017 (disestablished)
  - VFA-22 1990–2004 (initially converted to F/A-18E Super Hornet, 2004–2007; subsequently converted to F/A-18F Super Hornet, 2007–present)
  - VFA-25 1984–2013 (converted to F/A-18E Super Hornet)
  - VFA-27 1991–2004 (converted to F/A-18E Super Hornet)
  - VFA-34 1996–2019 (converted to F/A-18E Super Hornet)
  - VFA-37 1990–2018 (converted to F/A-18E Super Hornet)
  - VFA-81 1988–2008 (converted to F/A-18E Super Hornet)
  - VFA-82 1987–2005 (disestablished)
  - VFA-83 1988–2018 (converted to F/A-18E Super Hornet)
  - VFA-86 1987–2012 (converted to F/A-18E Super Hornet, but in the process of converting to the F-35C Lightning II)
  - VFA-87 1986–2015 (converted to F/A-18E Super Hornet)
  - VFA-94 1990–2016 (initially converted to F/A-18F Super Hornet, 2016–2023; subsequently converted to F/A-18E Super Hornet, 2023–present)
  - VFA-97 1991–2015 (converted to F/A-18E Super Hornet, but currently operating the F-35C Lightning II)
  - VFA-105 1990–2006 (converted to F/A-18E Super Hornet)
  - VFA-106 1984–2018 (fleet replacement squadron for USN and USMC; operates F/A-18E/F; legacy F/A-18A/A+/B/C/D Hornets phased out in 2018. Converted to F-35C)
  - VFA-113 1984–2016 (converted to F/A-18E Super Hornet)
  - VFA-115 1996–2001 (converted to F/A-18E Super Hornet, but will soon switch to the F-35C Lightning II)
  - VFA-122 2010–2013 (fleet replacement squadron for F/A-18E/F; legacy F/A-18A/A+/B/C/D Hornets phased out in 2013)
  - VFA-125 1980–2010 (disestablished, former fleet replacement squadron for USN and USMC; aircraft transferred to VFA-122 and legacy F/A-18A/A+/B/C/D Hornets phased out in 2013. Currently F-35C Fleet Replacement Squadron)
  - VFA-127 1989–1996 (disestablished)
  - VFA-131 1984–2018 (converted to F/A-18E Super Hornet)
  - VFA-132 1984–1992 (disestablished)
  - VFA-136 1985–2008 (converted to F/A-18E Super Hornet)
  - VFA-137 1985–2003 (converted to F/A-18E Super Hornet)
  - VFA-146 1989–2015 (converted to F/A-18E Super Hornet)
  - VFA-147 1989–2007 (converted to F/A-18E Super Hornet, but currently operating the F-35C Lightning II)
  - VFA-151 1986–2013 (converted to F/A-18E Super Hornet)
  - VFA-161 1986–1988 (disestablished)
  - VFA-192 1986–2014 (converted to F/A-18E Super Hornet)
  - VFA-195 1985–2011 (converted to the F/A-18E Super Hornet)
  - VFA-201 1999–2007 (Naval Air Reserve Force; disestablished)
  - VFA-203 1990–2004 (Naval Air Reserve Force; disestablished)
  - VFA-204 1990–2022 (Naval Air Reserve Force; converted to F-5N/F Tiger II)
  - VFA-303 1990–1994 (Naval Air Reserve Force; disestablished)
  - VFA-305 1990–1994 (Naval Air Reserve Force; disestablished)
  - VX-4 1982–1994 (merged with VX-5 in 1994 to form VX-9)
  - VX-5 1983–1994 (merged with VX-4 in 1994 to form VX-9)
  - VX-9 1994–2020 (legacy hornets phased out in 2020; currently operate F/A-18E/F and E/A-18G aircraft)
  - VX-23
  - VX-31
  - Naval Strike and Air Warfare Center / Naval Aviation Warfighting Development Center

== Aircraft on display ==
YF-18A

- 160775 – U.S. Naval Museum of Armament & Technology, NAWS China Lake, California. This is the first F/A-18A built in 1978. Aircraft was recently restored in the same livery after being built. Aircraft was moved off base for better public viewing.
- 160780 – Virginia Air and Space Center, Hampton, Virginia.

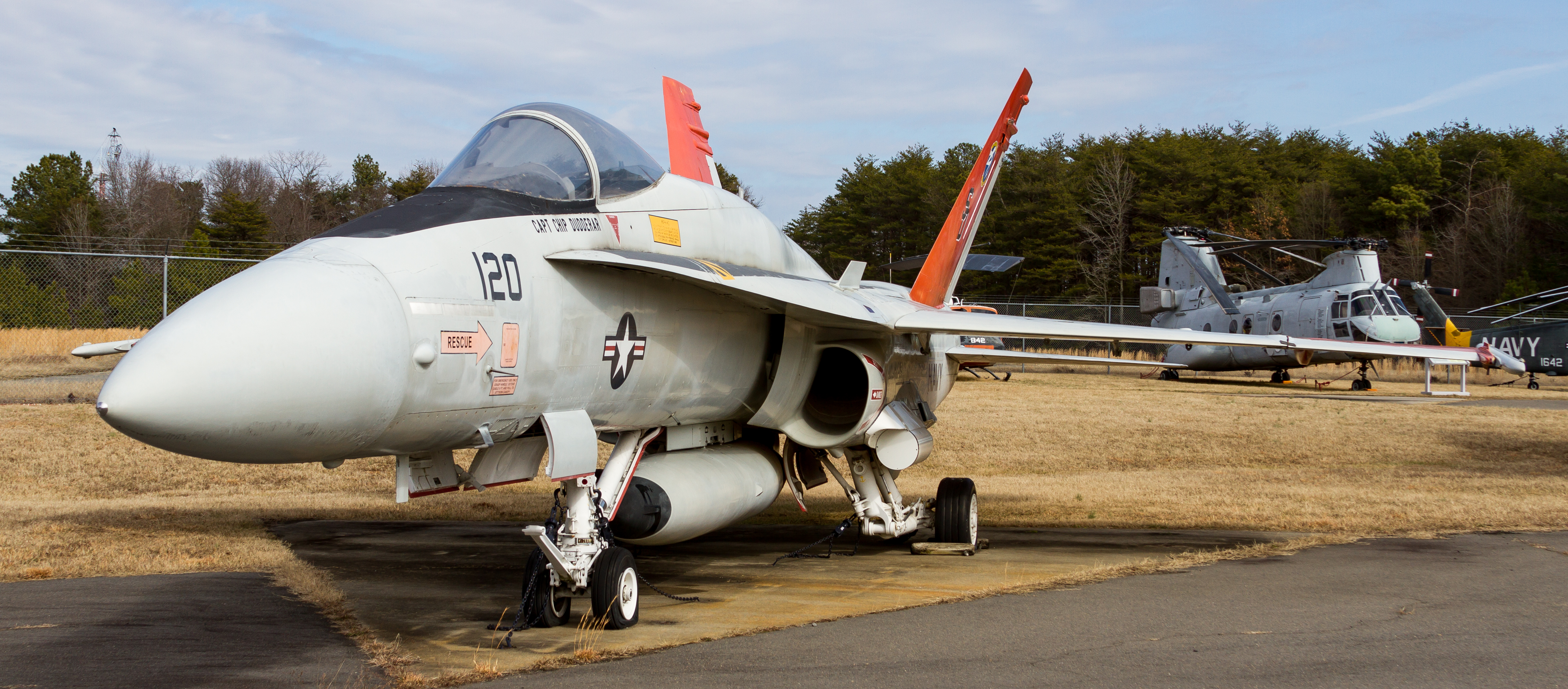
An F/A-18A Hornet on display at the Patuxent River Naval Air Museum

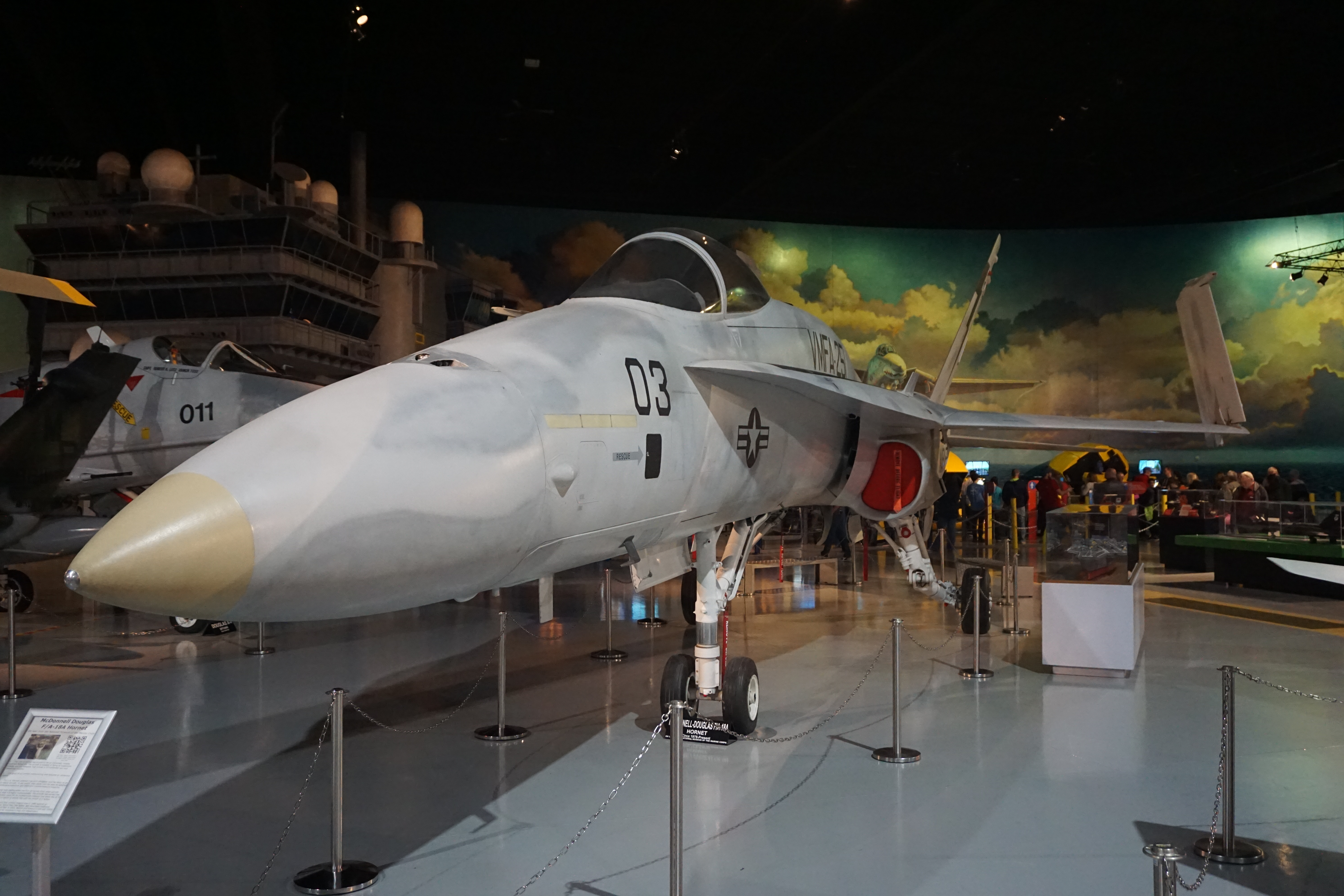
F/A-18A on display at the Air Zoo

F/A-18A

- 161353 – Patuxent River Naval Air Museum, NAS Patuxent River, Lexington Park, Maryland.
- 161366 – Naval Air Station Lemoore, California, main gate.
- 161367 – Naval Air Systems Command Headquarters Building, NAS Patuxent River, Lexington Park, Maryland.
- 161712 – Naval Air Station Joint Reserve Base Fort Worth, Fort Worth, Texas, in VMFA-112 markings.
- 161725 – California Science Center museum, Los Angeles, California.
- 161726 – In Blue Angels markings, main gate, NAS JRB New Orleans, New Orleans, Louisiana.
- 161749 – Flying Leatherneck Aviation Museum, MCAS Miramar, California.
- 161941 – In Blue Angels #1 markings, main gate, NAS Jacksonville Heritage Park, Jacksonville, Florida.
- 161942 – In Blue Angels #1 markings, USS Lexington Museum, Corpus Christi, Texas. On loan from the National Naval Aviation Museum at NAS Pensacola, Florida.
- 161948 - In Blue Angels markings, Valiant Air Command Warbird Museum, Titusville, Florida. On loan from the National Naval Aviation Museum.
- 161957 – Naval Air Warfare Center Training Systems Division (NAWCTSD), Naval Support Activity Orlando, Florida. This aircraft was relocated from NAS Atlanta, Georgia, following that installation's BRAC-directed closure.
- 161961 – Naval Air Station Pensacola, Florida, main gate in Blue Angels #1 markings.
- 161982 – Navy Inventory Control Point Philadelphia (NAVINCP-P), Philadelphia, Pennsylvania.
- 161983 – In Blue Angels #5 markings, Navy–Marine Corps Memorial Stadium, Annapolis, Maryland.
- 162430 – Palm Springs Air Museum, Palm Springs, California.
- 162435 – Patriots Point Naval & Maritime Museum, Mount Pleasant, South Carolina.

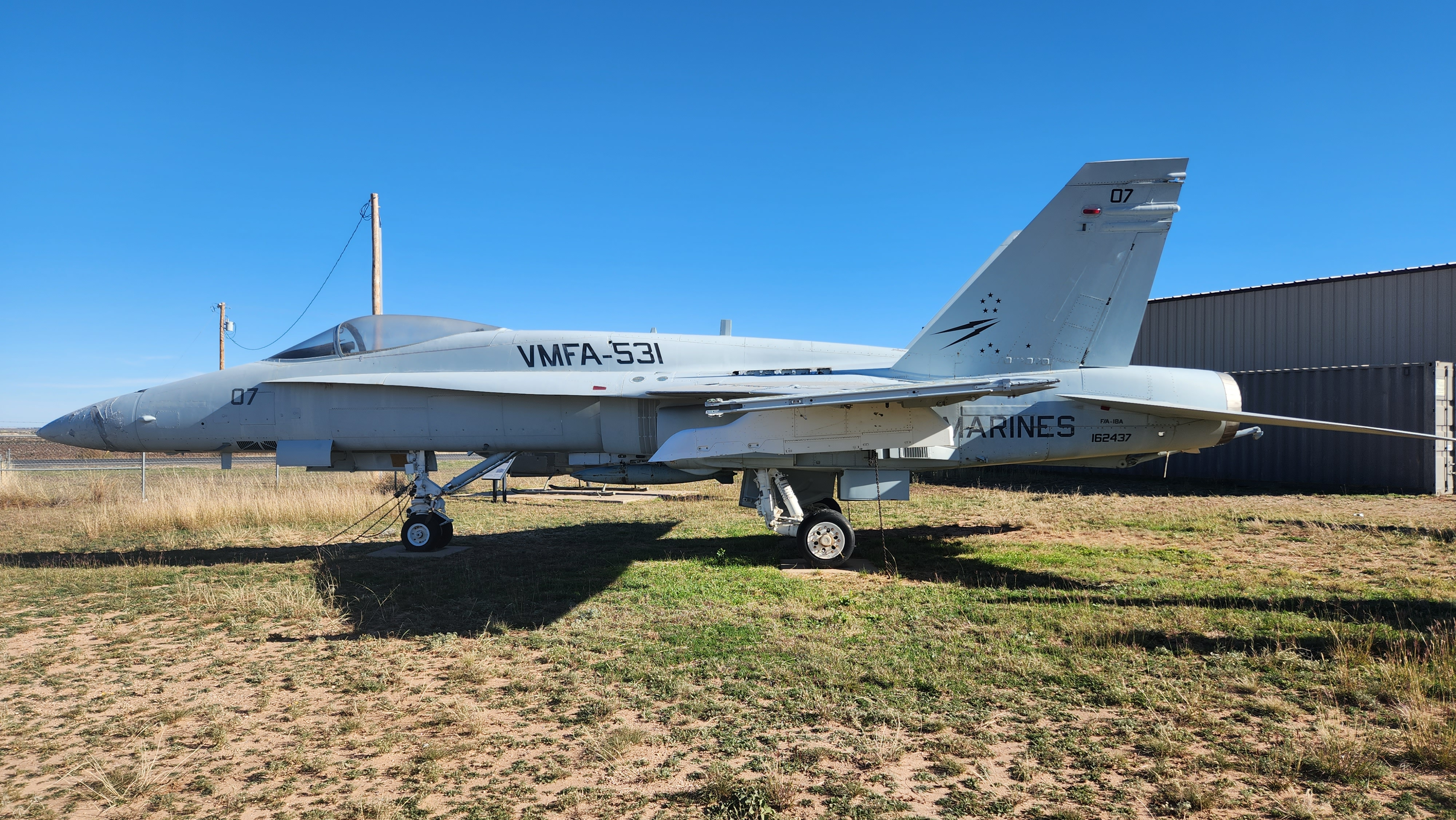
F/A-18A on display at the Texas Air Museum in Slaton, Texas

- 162437 – Texas Air Museum, Slaton, Texas in VMFA-531 markings
- 162448 – Naval Air Facility El Centro, California, main gate.
- 162454 – NAS Oceana Air Park, Naval Air Station Oceana, Virginia.
- 162826 – In Blue Angels #3 markings, Fort Worth Aviation Museum, Fort Worth, Texas.
- 162901 – USS Midway (CV-41), San Diego Aircraft Carrier Museum, San Diego, California.
- 163093 – In Blue Angels #6 markings, Pima Air and Space Museum, Tucson, Arizona
- 163119 – Defense Supply Center Richmond, Richmond, Virginia.
- 163152 – Flying Leatherneck Aviation Museum, MCAS Miramar, California.
- 163157 – MCAS Beaufort, South Carolina.

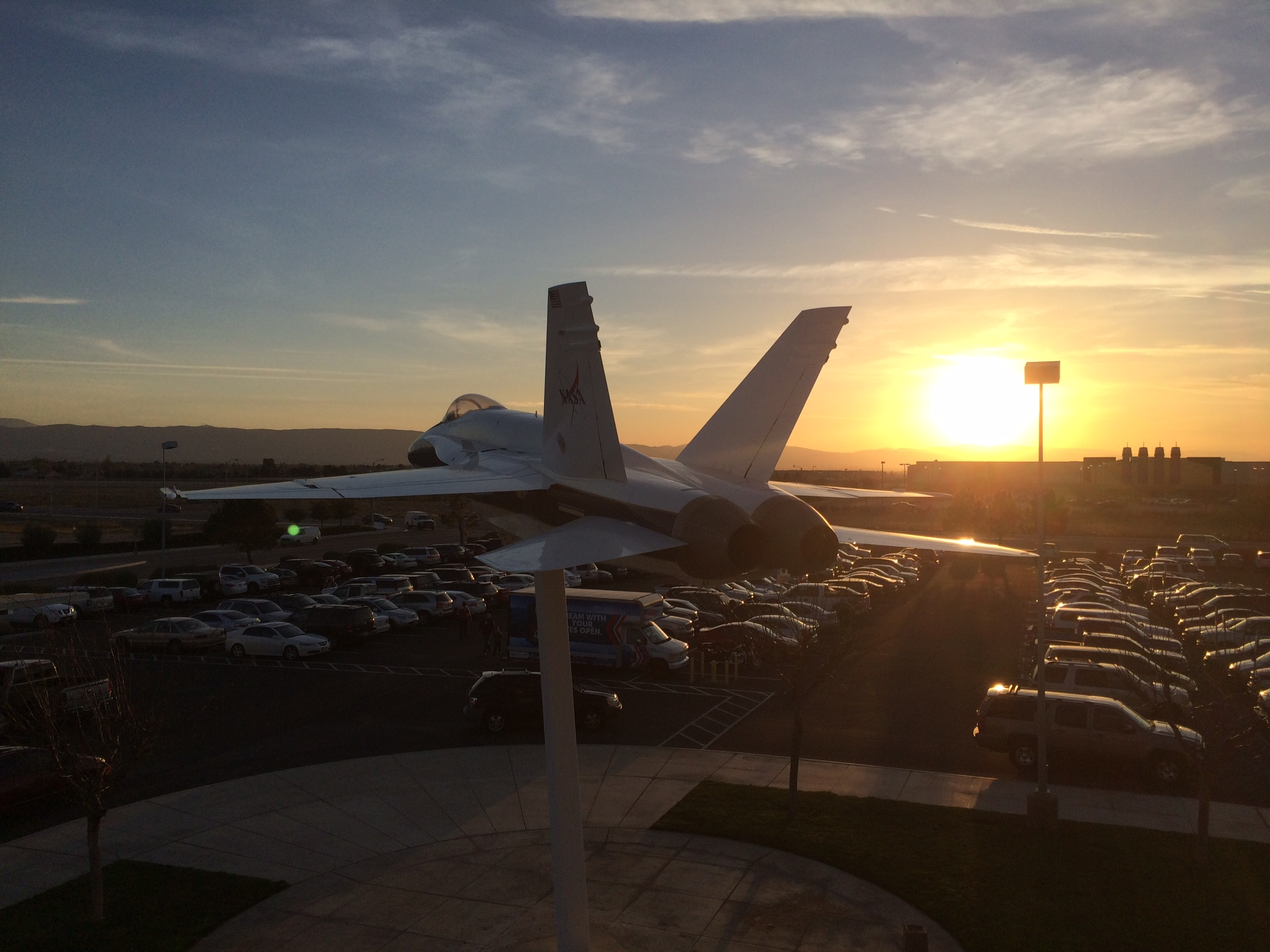
NASA F/A-18A at JetHawks Stadium

- Unknown – The Hangar (Lancaster JetHawks stadium), Lancaster, California. Painted as NASA No. 842.
- 162436 – On display at the Wings of Freedom Aviation Museum, Horsham, Pennsylvania.
- 161521 – In Blue Angels #3 markings. Third Hornet received by Blue Angels (1987). Under restoration and display at Moffett Historical Museum, Moffett Federal Airfield, California.
- 162411 – In Blue Angel #5 markings with the names Lt. Cmdr. Dick Oliver and Lt. Cmdr. Stuart Powrie. Oliver died when flying a F-11A in 1966 for the Blue Angels and Powrie died in an A-4 Skyhawk. Located at then Hickory Aviation Museum, Hickory, North Carolina.
- A21-023 – In 'Worimi' Livery at Fighter World, Williamtown, New South Wales.

F/A-18B

- 161746 – In Blue Angels #7 markings at Saint Louis Science Center, Saint Louis, Missouri.
- 161943 – In Blue Angels #7 markings at Yanks Air Museum, Chino, California.

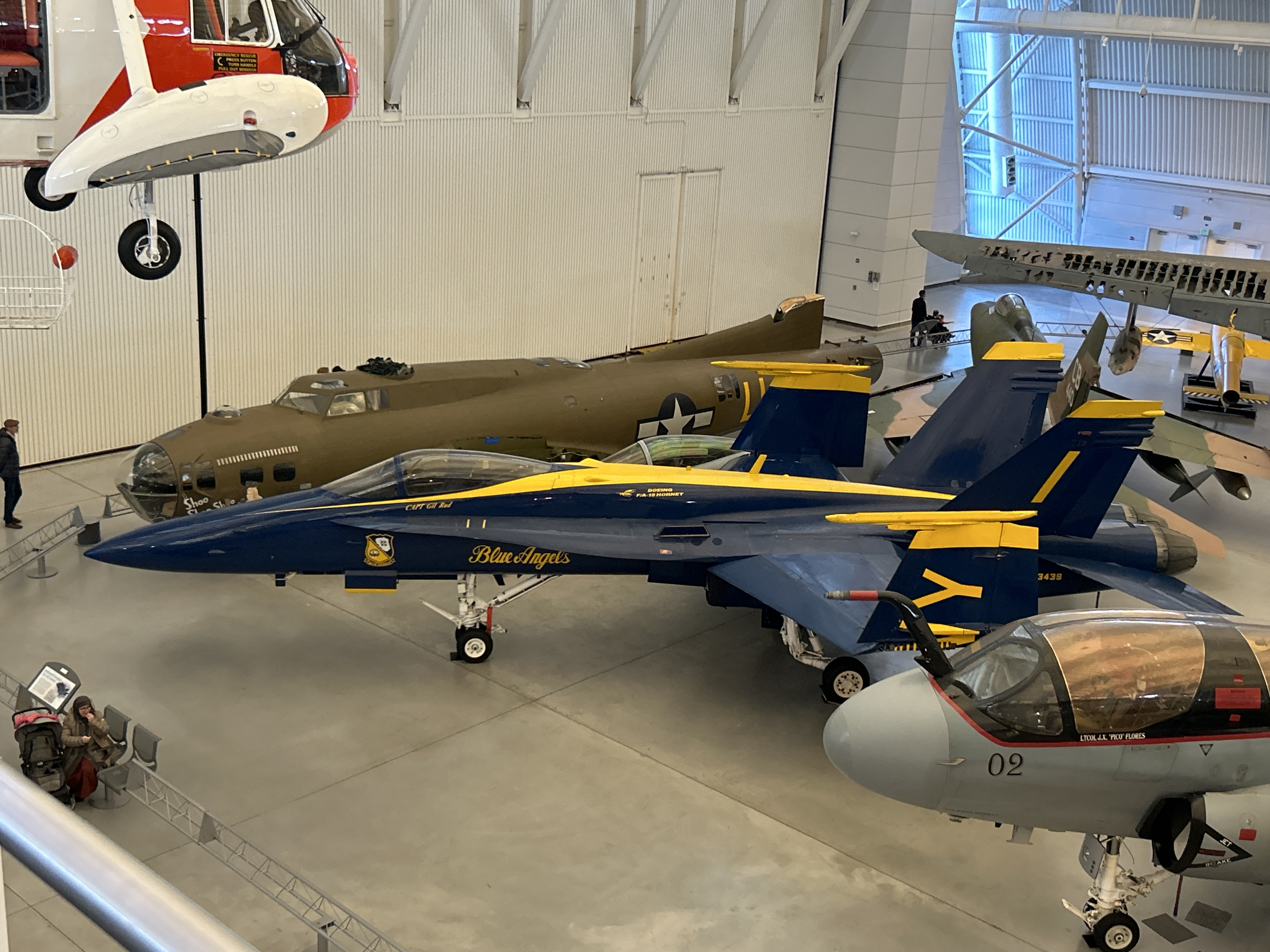
Blue Angels F/A-18C 163439 at the Steven F. Udvar-Hazy Center

F/A-18C

- 163106 – In Blue Angels #2 markings, Museum of Flight, Seattle, Washington.
- 163437 – In front of Headquarters, Naval Air Force Atlantic, Naval Station Norfolk, Norfolk, Virginia.
- 163439 – In Blue Angels #1 markings at the Steven F. Udvar-Hazy Center in Chantilly, Virginia.
- 163485 - In Blue Angels #4 markings at Yankee Air Museum, Belleville, Michigan
- 163498 – Lee Victory Recreation Park, Smyrna, Tennessee.
- 163766 – In Blue Angels #1 markings at Naval Air Station Corpus Christi, Corpus Christi, Texas
- 163768 – In Blue Angels #4 markings at Pearl Harbor Aviation Museum, Ford Island, Pearl Harbor, Hawaii

F/A-18D

- 163486 – MCAS Beaufort (East Side), Beaufort, South Carolina. Painted as VMFA(AW)-533 CO bird, aircraft 01 at the officers' club.

== Notable accidents ==
- On 8 December 2008, a U.S. Marine Corps F/A-18D crashed in a populated area of San Diego, California while on approach to Marine Corps Air Station Miramar, killing four people on the ground. The pilot ejected safely; there was no weapon systems officer on board the aircraft.
- On 6 April 2012, a USN F/A-18D from VFA-106 crashed into apartment buildings in Virginia Beach, Virginia. Both crew members ejected. Seven people were injured including the two pilots, who were taken to the hospital; all survived. The crew performed a last-second fuel dump, and thus may have prevented a large explosion and fire after the crash.
- On 2 June 2016, U.S. Marine Corps Captain Jeff Kuss fatally crashed due to weather and fatigue, during a training exercise to prepare for the Great Tennessee Air Show. Capt. Kuss's jet (Blue Angels No. 6) crashed about two miles from the runway after an attempted "Split S" maneuver.
- On 24 August 2023, a U.S. Marine Corps F/A-18D crashed after taking off from Marine Corps Air Station Miramar. The sole pilot onboard died after ejecting from the aircraft.
- On 21 August 2025, a Royal Malaysian Air Force F/A-18D Hornet caught fire and crashed during takeoff from Kuantan Air Base. Both pilots ejected safely. This incident marked the first loss of Malaysia’s aging Hornet fleet, raising concerns about the country’s defense capabilities. The Prime Minister called for a full investigation, and the event attracted widespread media attention.
- On June 13, 2026, an F/A-18 Hornet of the 3rd Marine Aircraft Wing crashed into a wooded mountain side near Rimrock Lake during a routine training flight, sparking a brush fire. The single pilot of the aircraft ejected the aircraft with minor injuries, and was recovered without incident.

== Specifications (F/A-18C/D) ==
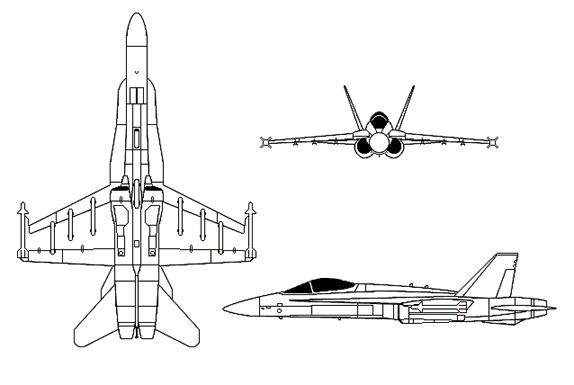
3-view drawing of the F/A-18 Hornet

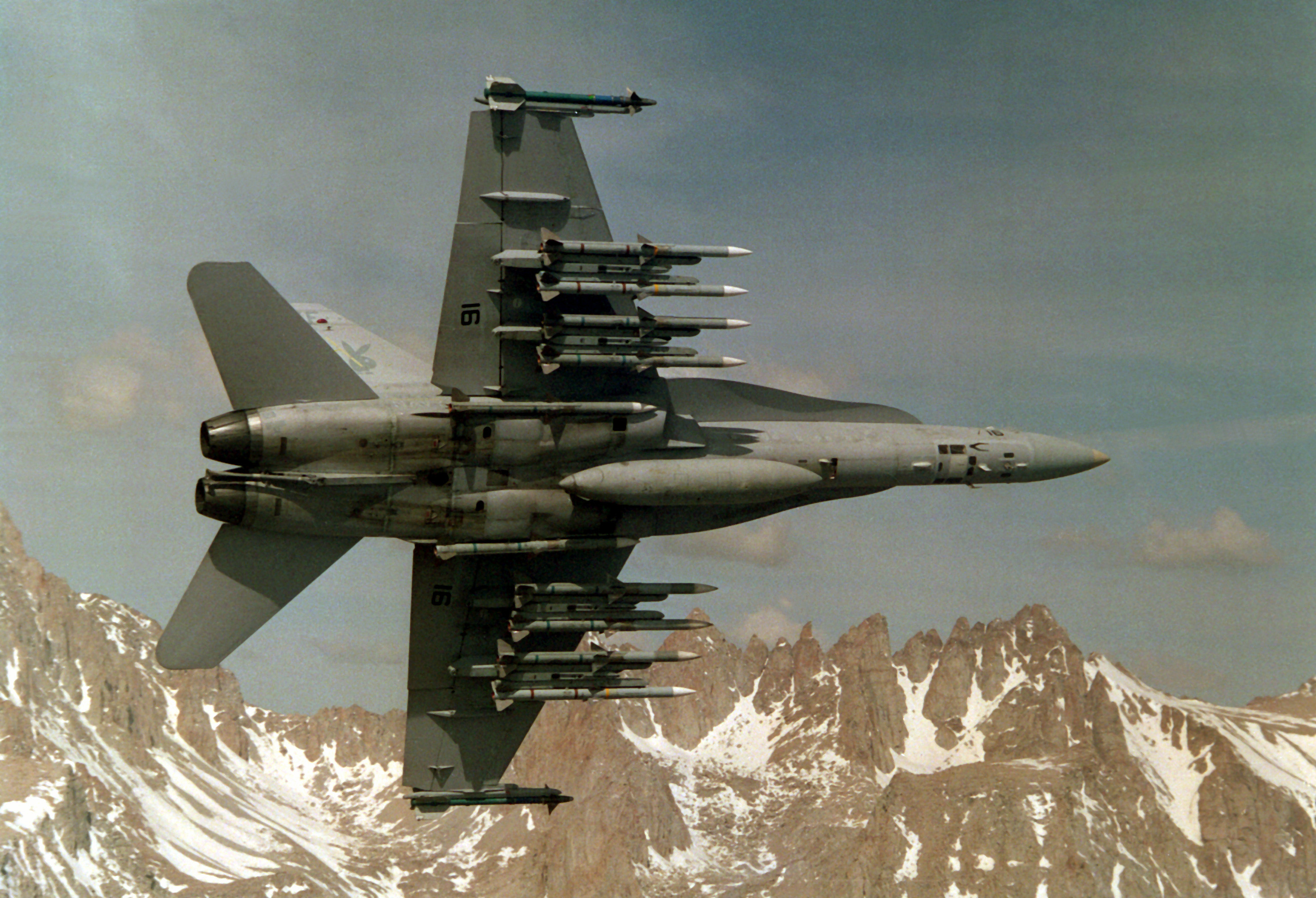
VX-4 F/A-18 with ten AIM-120 AMRAAMs and two AIM-9 Sidewinders

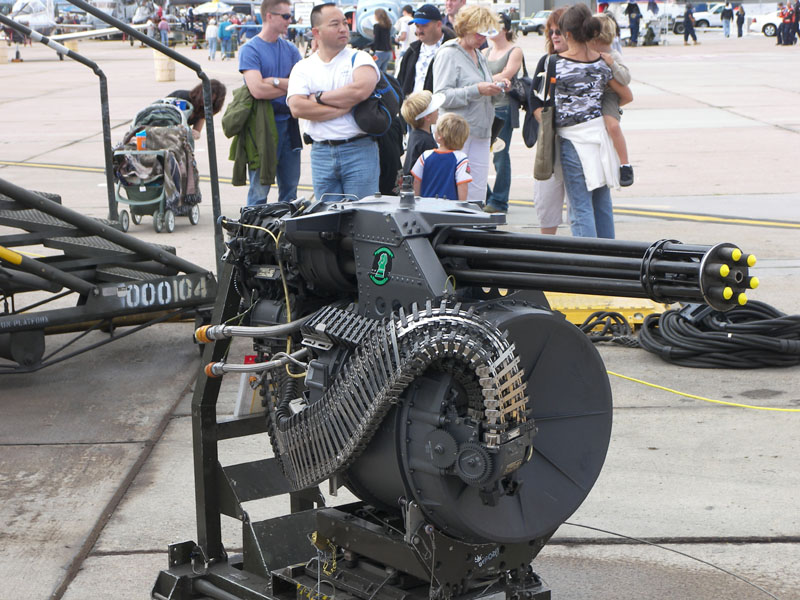
M61 Vulcan on display at Miramar Airshow

Data from U.S. Navy fact file, F/A-18A/B/C/D NATOPS, Frawley Directory, Great Book

General characteristics

- Crew: 1 (C - pilot)/2 (D - pilot and weapon systems officer)
- Length: 56 ft 1 in (17.1 m)
- Wingspan: 40 ft 4 in (12.3 m) with AIM-9 Sidewinders on wingtip LAU-7 launchers
- Width: 27 ft 7 in (8.4 m) wing folded
- Height: 15 ft 5 in (4.7 m)
- Wing area: 410 sq ft (38 m^{2})
- Aspect ratio: 4
- Airfoil: root:NACA 65A005 mod.; tip:NACA 65A003.5 mod.
- Empty weight: 23,000 lb (10,433 kg)
- Gross weight: 36,970 lb (16,769 kg)
- Max takeoff weight: 51,900 lb (23,541 kg)
- Fuel capacity: 10,860 pounds (4,930 kg) internally
- Powerplant: 2 × General Electric F404-GE-402 afterburning turbofan engines, 11,000 lbf (49 kN) thrust each dry, 17,750 lbf (79.0 kN) with afterburner

Performance

- Maximum speed: Mach 1.8, 1,034 kn (1,190 mph; 1,915 km/h) at 40,000 ft (12,192 m) altitude
  - Mach 1.06, 700 kn (806 mph; 1,296 km/h) at sea level
- Cruise speed: 480 kn (550 mph, 890 km/h)
- Range: 1,089 nmi (1,253 mi, 2,017 km) clean with two AIM-9s
- Combat range: 400 nmi (460 mi, 740 km) air-to-air mission
- Ferry range: 1,800 nmi (2,100 mi, 3,300 km) with three external tanks
- Service ceiling: 50,000 ft (15,000 m)
- Rate of climb: 50,000 ft/min (250 m/s)
- Wing loading: 93 lb/sq ft (450 kg/m^{2})
- Thrust/weight: 0.96 (1.13 with loaded weight at 50% internal fuel)

Armament

- Guns: 1× 20 mm (0.787 in) M61A1 Vulcan nose mounted 6-barrel rotary cannon, 578 rounds
- Hardpoints: 9 total: 2 × missile launch rails on wingtips, 4 × under wing, and 3 × under fuselage with a capacity of 13,700 lb (6,200 kg) external fuel and ordnance, with provisions to carry combinations of:
  - Rockets:
    - 2.75 in (70 mm) Hydra 70 rockets
    - 5 in (127.0 mm) Zuni rockets
    - 2.75 in (70 mm) APKWS rockets
  - Missiles:
    - Air-to-air missiles:
      - 2 × AIM-9 Sidewinder on wingtips and
      - 8 × AIM-9 Sidewinder (with double-racks) or 4 × AIM-132 ASRAAM or 4 × IRIS-T (EF-18A/B) or 8 × AIM-120 AMRAAM (with double-racks) and
      - 2× AIM-7 Sparrow or 2 × AIM-120 AMRAAM
    - Air-to-surface missiles:
      - 4 × AGM-65 Maverick
      - AGM-84H/K Standoff Land Attack Missile Expanded Response (SLAM-ER)
      - AGM-88 HARM Anti-radiation missile (ARM)
      - 4 × AGM-154 Joint Standoff Weapon (JSOW)
      - AGM-158 Joint Air-to-Surface Standoff Missile (JASSM)
      - Taurus KEPD 350 cruise missile
    - Anti-ship missile:
      - AGM-84 Harpoon
  - Bombs:
    - B43 nuclear bomb (retired)
    - B61 nuclear bomb
    - Joint Direct Attack Munition JDAM precision-guided munition (PGMs)
    - Paveway series of laser-guided bombs
    - Mk 80 series of unguided bombs
    - CBU-78 Gator
    - CBU-87 Combined Effects Munition
    - CBU-97 Sensor Fuzed Weapon
    - Mk 20 Rockeye II
    - Mk 77 Incendiary bomb
  - Other:
    - ADM-141 TALD
    - SUU-42A/A Flares/Infrared decoys dispenser pod and chaff pod or
    - Electronic countermeasures (ECM) pod
    - up to 3 × 330 US gallons (270 imp gal; 1,200 L) Sargent Fletcher FPU-8/A drop tanks for ferry flight or extended range/loitering time.

Avionics

- AN/AAS-38 Nite Hawk targeting pods (U.S. Navy only), replaced by AN/ASQ-228 ATFLIR or
- AN/AAQ-28 Litening targeting pod (USMC, Royal Australian Air Force, Spanish Air and Space Force, and Finnish Air Force only)
- AN/ALR-67 radar warning receiver
- Hughes AN/APG-73 radar
- AN/AYK-14(V) Weapons System Computer
- ROVER (Remotely Operated Video Enhanced Receiver) antenna for use by U.S. Navy's F/A-18C strike fighter squadrons

== See also ==
- Aircraft in fiction#F/A-18 Hornet for notable appearances in the media.
- 4th generation jet fighter

Related development

- Northrop YF-17
- McDonnell Douglas CF-18 Hornet
- Boeing F/A-18E/F Super Hornet
- Boeing EA-18G Growler
- High Alpha Research Vehicle
- Boeing X-53 Active Aeroelastic Wing

Aircraft of comparable role, configuration, and era

- General Dynamics F-16 Fighting Falcon
- Chengdu J-10
- Mikoyan MiG-29
- Vought Model 1600

Related lists

- List of active United States military aircraft
- List of fighter aircraft
- List of military electronics of the United States
