= Model 96 store =

The McDonnell Model 96 store was a disposable weapons/fuel pod developed for the F-101A Voodoo under development by the Strategic Air Command in the early 1950s.

== Development ==
Originally developed as an escort fighter for early Strategic Air Command bombers such as the B-36, the B-47, and the B-50, the mission of the F-101 was changed to that of a "strategic fighter" with equal emphasis on bomber escort and nuclear weapons delivery. This change took place in late 1952, while the F-101A was still under development.

At that time, small nuclear weapons suitable for high-speed external carriage did not exist. The MK 5 and MK 7 weapons were initially considered for use with the new F-101. However, the existing MK 5 bomb would have produced excessive drag and the MK 7, already deployed by F-84 units, was restricted to a maximum carriage speed of Mach 0.82, prohibiting full use of the high-speed performance of the Voodoo. Since use of the MK 7 did not represent a significant improvement over existing capabilities, a commission of representatives from the Air Force, the Armed Forces Special Weapons Project (AFSWP), Sandia Corporation, and the Atomic Energy Commission (AEC) was formed in August 1953 to consider a derivative of the MK 5 as the XW-5/F-101 Joint Project Group. Originally envisioned as a new streamlined casing for the W-5 payload, the new store allowed for the carriage of extra fuel, increasing the combat range of the F-101. The Air Force and the AEC allocated 8 million dollars toward the development of a combination weapons/fuel pod designed, developed, and produced by McDonnell Aircraft Company as the Model 96 store.

Initially, the Model 96 store was to weigh between four and five tons and carry a W-5 fission warhead with a yield of about 80 kilotons. Ballistic testing of the pod began with the first drop of a Model 96 "shape" from a B-47 on March 6, 1954. However, the rapid development of compact thermonuclear weapons led to the W-5 being superseded by the W-15 warhead, based on a Los Alamos device nicknamed Zombie. Although somewhat larger and heavier than the W-5, the W-15 boasted a much greater yield of between 1 and 3 megatons. The resulting pod was 32 feet long, 42 inches in diameter, and had capacity for 703 gallons of fuel in addition to the 6,000-pound class W-15 warhead. The Model 96 store attached directly to the belly of the F-101A. A retractable ventral fin allowed the aircraft to rotate during takeoff. The gross takeoff weight of the F-101/Model 96 combination was just less than 50,000 pounds. Over 19,000 pounds of fuel would have been available in this configuration, giving a high-altitude combat radius of 1,287 nautical miles and a mission endurance of about five hours. To help contend with the extra weight, the F-101 had provision for dual droppable mainwheels that could be attached to the main landing gear.

Flight testing of the Model 96 store mounted on the F-101A began in July 1955, using the tenth preproduction aircraft, 53–2427, to conduct the tests. However, stability problems due to interference effects between the aircraft and the large pod quickly became apparent. Besides experiencing heavy buffeting, the Voodoo also exhibited instability along the roll and yaw axes when carrying the Model 96 store. Considering to Voodoo's propensity for inertia coupling and for sensitivity to "pitch-up" at its cruising altitude, this represented a serious problem. Despite the sustained efforts of the McDonnell engineers, these problems were never entirely overcome.

In May 1955, late in the development of the Model 96 store, the AEC approved a modified version of the Model 96 carrying the new, lighter W-27 thermonuclear warhead with a yield of 2 megatons. This configuration allowed for a 2,700 pound warhead along with 849 gallons of transferable fuel, and weighed just less than 10,000 pounds. However, the continuing problems with the Model 96/F-101 combination coupled with the rapid development of the MK 28 EX weapon resulted in the demise of the Model 96 program in March 1956.
