= Fineness ratio =

Ratio in naval architecture and aerospace engineering

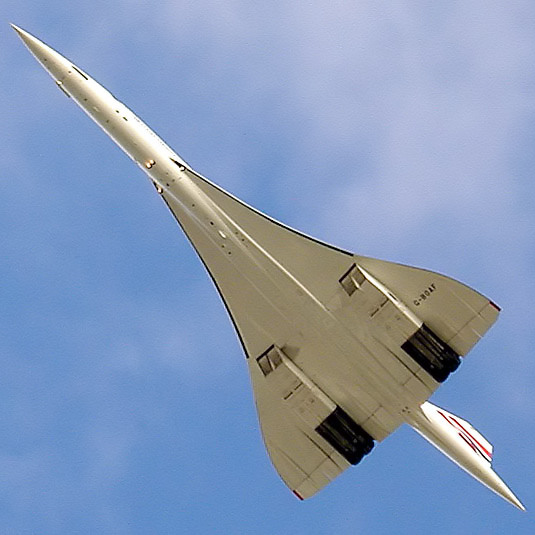
A Concorde in its final flight. The extremely high fineness ratio of the fuselage is evident.

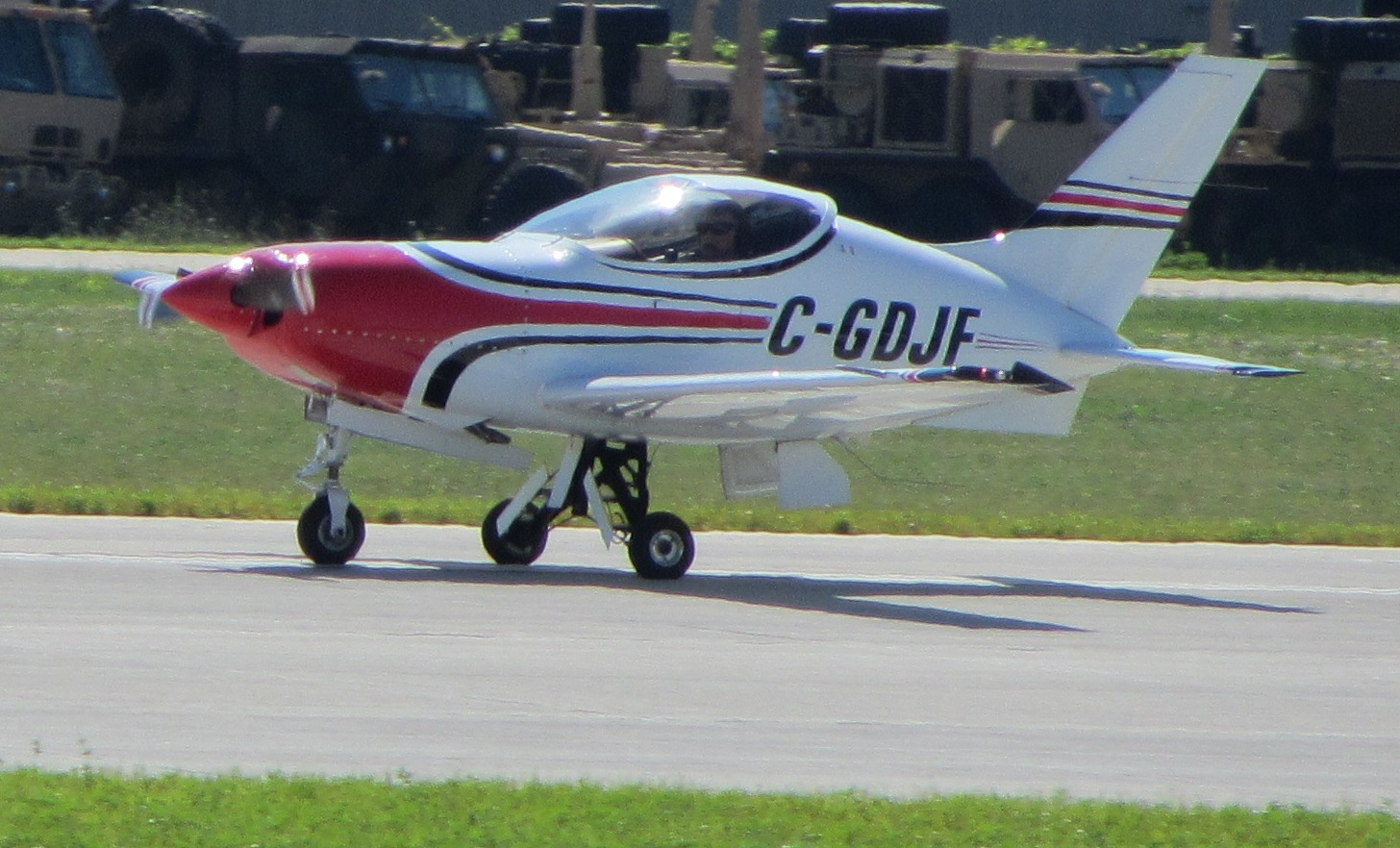
Questair Venture, with an egg-shaped, very-low-fineness-ratio fuselage

In naval architecture and aerospace engineering, the fineness ratio is the ratio of the length of a body to its maximum width. Shapes that are short and wide have a low fineness ratio, those that are long and narrow have high fineness ratios. Aircraft that spend time at supersonic speeds, e.g. the Concorde, generally have high fineness ratios.

At speeds below critical mach, one of the primary forms of drag is skin friction. As the name implies, this is drag caused by the interaction of the airflow with the aircraft's skin. To minimize this drag, the aircraft should be designed to minimize the exposed skin area, or "wetted surface". One solution to this problem is constructing an "egg shaped" fuselage, for example as used on the home-built Questair Venture.

Theoretical ideal fineness ratios in subsonic aircraft fuselages are typically found at about 6:1, however this may be compromised by other design considerations such as seating or freight size requirements. Because a higher fineness fuselage can have reduced tail surfaces, this ideal ratio can practically be increased to 8:1.

Most aircraft have fineness ratios significantly greater than this, however. This is often due to the competing need to place the tail control surfaces at the end of a longer moment arm to increase their effectiveness. Reducing the length of the fuselage would require larger controls, which would offset the drag savings from using the ideal fineness ratio. An example of a high-performance design with an imperfect fineness ratio is the Lancair. In other cases, the designer is forced to use a non-ideal design due to outside factors such as seating arrangements or cargo pallet sizes. Modern airliners often have fineness ratios much higher than ideal, a side effect of their cylindrical cross-section which is selected for strength, as well as providing a single width to simplify seating layout and air cargo handling.

As an aircraft approaches the speed of sound, shock waves form on areas of greater curvature. These shock waves radiate away energy that the engines must supply, energy that does not go into making the aircraft go faster. This appears to be a new form of drag—referred to as wave drag—which peaks at about three times the drag at speeds even slightly below the critical mach. In order to minimize wave drag, the curvature of the aircraft should be kept to a minimum, which implies much higher fineness ratios. This is why high-speed aircraft have long pointed noses and tails, and cockpit canopies that are flush to the fuselage line.

More technically, the best possible performance for a supersonic design is typified by two "perfect shapes", the Sears-Haack body which is pointed at both ends, or the von Kármán ogive, which has a blunt tail. Examples of the former design include the Concorde, F-104 Starfighter and XB-70 Valkyrie, although to some degree practically every post-World War II interceptor aircraft featured such a design. The latter is mostly seen on rockets and missiles, with the blunt end being the rocket nozzle. Missile designers are even less interested in low-speed performance, and missiles generally have higher fineness ratios than most aircraft.

The introduction of aircraft with higher fineness ratios also introduced a new form of instability, inertial coupling. As the engines and cockpit moved away from the aircraft's center of mass with the longer fuselages demanded by the high fineness ratio, the roll inertia of these masses grew to be able to overwhelm the power of the aerodynamic surfaces. A variety of methods are used to combat this effect, including oversized controls and stability augmentation systems.
