= List of X-3 flights =

Following is a list of flights of the Douglas X-3 Stiletto, the American experimental aircraft that first flew in October 1952 and retired in 1956.

== X-3 pilots ==
Pilot	Agency	Flights	Aircraft
Bill Bridgeman	Douglas Aircraft	26	49–2892
Frank Everest	USAF-NACA	3	49–2892
Joseph Walker	NACA	20	49–2892
Chuck Yeager	USAF-NACA	3	49–2892

== X-3 flights ==
Vehicle Flight #	Date	Pilot	Aircraft	Agency	Velocity -Mach-	Altitude: m -	Comments
X-3 #0	October 15, 1952	Bill Bridgeman	49–2892	Douglas 0	?	?	Scheduled taxi test. Became airborne for 1-mile.
X-3 #1	October 20, 1952	Bill Bridgeman	49–2892	Douglas 1	?	?	First "Official" flight. Flew 20-minutes.
X-3 #2	?, 1952	Bill Bridgeman	49–2892	Douglas 2	?	?	-
X-3 #3	?, 1952	Bill Bridgeman	49–2892	Douglas 3	?	?	-
X-3 #4	?, 1952	Bill Bridgeman	49–2892	Douglas 4	?	?	-
X-3 #5	?, 1953	Bill Bridgeman	49–2892	Douglas 5	?	?	-
X-3 #6	?, 1953	Bill Bridgeman	49–2892	Douglas 6	?	?	-
X-3 #7	?, 1953	Bill Bridgeman	49–2892	Douglas 7	?	?	-
X-3 #8	?, 1953	Bill Bridgeman	49–2892	Douglas 8	?	?	-
X-3 #9	?, 1953	Bill Bridgeman	49–2892	Douglas 9	?	?	-
X-3 #10	?, 1953	Bill Bridgeman	49–2892	Douglas 10	?	?	-
X-3 #11	?, 1953	Bill Bridgeman	49–2892	Douglas 11	?	?	-
X-3 #12	July 28, 1953	Bill Bridgeman	49–2892	Douglas 12	1.208	?	Fastest X-3 flight.
X-3 #13	?, 1953	Bill Bridgeman	49–2892	Douglas 13	?	?	-
X-3 #14	?, 1953	Bill Bridgeman	49–2892	Douglas 14	?	?	-
X-3 #15	?, 1953	Bill Bridgeman	49–2892	Douglas 15	?	?	-
X-3 #16	?, 1953	Bill Bridgeman	49–2892	Douglas 16	?	?	-
X-3 #17	?, 1953	Bill Bridgeman	49–2892	Douglas 17	?	?	-
X-3 #18	?, 1953	Bill Bridgeman	49–2892	Douglas 18	?	?	-
X-3 #19	?, 1953	Bill Bridgeman	49–2892	Douglas 19	?	?	-
X-3 #20	?, 1953	Bill Bridgeman	49–2892	Douglas 20	?	?	-
X-3 #21	?, 1953	Bill Bridgeman	49–2892	Douglas 21	?	?	-
X-3 #22	?, 1953	Bill Bridgeman	49–2892	Douglas 22	?	?	-
X-3 #23	?, 1953	Bill Bridgeman	49–2892	Douglas 23	?	?	-
X-3 #24	?, 1953	Bill Bridgeman	49–2892	Douglas 24	?	?	-
X-3 #25	December, 1953	Bill Bridgeman	49–2892	Douglas 25	?	?	Last Douglas evaluation flight.
X-3 #26	July, 1954	Frank Everest	49–2892	USAF 1	?	?	Joint USAF-NACA evaluation flight.
X-3 #27	July, 1954	Frank Everest	49–2892	USAF 2	?	?	Joint USAF-NACA evaluation flight.
X-3 #28	July, 1954	Frank Everest	49–2892	USAF 3	?	?	Joint USAF-NACA evaluation flight.
X-3 #29	July, 1954	Chuck Yeager	49–2892	USAF 4	?	?	Joint USAF-NACA evaluation flight.
X-3 #30	July, 1954	Chuck Yeager	49–2892	USAF 5	?	?	Joint USAF-NACA evaluation flight.
X-3 #31	July, 1954	Chuck Yeager	49–2892	USAF 6	?	?	Joint USAF-NACA evaluation flight.
X-3 #32	August 23, 1954	Joseph Walker	49–2892	NACA 1	?	?	Pilot familiarization.
X-3 #33	September 3, 1954	Joseph Walker	49–2892	NACA 2	?	?	Static longitudinal stability and control, wing and tail loads, and pressure distribution.
X-3 #34	September 9, 1954	Joseph Walker	49–2892	NACA 3	?	?	Same as flight 2.
X-3 #35	September 9, 1954	Joseph Walker	49–2892	NACA 4	?	?	Same as flight 2.
X-3 #36	September 16, 1954	Joseph Walker	49–2892	NACA 5	?	?	Same as flight 2.
X-3 #37	October 19, 1954	Joseph Walker	49–2892	NACA 6	?	?	Same as flight 2.
X-3 #38	October 21, 1954	Joseph Walker	49–2892	NACA 7	?	?	Same as flight 2.
X-3 #39	October 21, 1954	Joseph Walker	49–2892	NACA 8	?	?	Investigation of lateral and directional stability and control.
X-3 #40	October 21, 1954	Joseph Walker	49–2892	NACA 9	?	?	Same as flight 8.
X-3 #41	October 27, 1954	Joseph Walker	49–2892	NACA 10	1.154	9,862	Walker's 10th flight. Tumbled out of control. Pilot recovered. Airframe stressed to limit.
X-3 #42	September 20, 1955	Joseph Walker	49–2892	NACA 11	?	?	Investigation of longitudinal stability and control, wing and tail loads, and wing pressure distribution.
X-3 #43	September 22, 1955	Joseph Walker	49–2892	NACA 12	?	?	Same as flight 11.
X-3 #44	October 6, 1955	Joseph Walker	49–2892	NACA 13	?	?	Directional stability and control, vertical tail loads.
X-3 #45	October 12, 1955	Joseph Walker	49–2892	NACA 14	?	?	Same as flight 13. Drag chute inadvertently deployed in flight without damage to aircraft.
X-3 #46	October 20, 1955	Joseph Walker	49–2892	NACA 15	?	?	Dynamic lateral stability and control, vertical tail loads.
X-3 #47	October 21, 1956	Joseph Walker	49–2892	NACA 16	?	?	Same as flight 15.
X-3 #48	October 23, 1955	Joseph Walker	49–2892	NACA 17	?	?	Same as flight 15. flight marked conclusion of NACA X-3 static and dynamic stability and control and tail loads programs on the aircraft.
X-3 #49	December 13, 1955	Joseph Walker	49–2892	NACA 18	?	?	Control system evaluation. One engine damaged from ingestion of pressure probe; X-3 grounded for maintenance and repairs.
X-3 #50	April 4, 1956	Joseph Walker	49–2892	NACA 19	?	?	Pressure distribution measurements. Nose instrumentation compartment fire caused minor damage to flight-test instrumentation.
X-3 #51	May 23, 1956	Joseph Walker	49–2892	NACA 20	?	?	Lateral control investigation; last NACA flight. Plane retired.
