= Trapezoidal wing =

Aircraft wing shape

Trapezoidal planform

In aeronautics, a trapezoidal wing is a straight-edged and tapered wing planform. It may have any aspect ratio and may or may not be swept.

The thin, unswept, short-span, low-aspect-ratio trapezoidal configuration offers some advantages for high-speed flight and has been used on a small number of aircraft types. In this wing configuration, the leading edge sweeps back and the trailing edge sweeps forward. It can provide low aerodynamic drag at high speeds, while maintaining high strength and stiffness. It was used successfully during the early days of supersonic aircraft.

== Design principles ==
Any wing with straight leading and trailing edges and with differing root and tip chords is a trapezoid, whether or not it is swept.

The area A of such a trapezoidal wing may be calculated from the span s, root chord c_{r} and tip chord c_{t}:

$$A = s \frac{c_r + c_t}{2}$$

The wing loading w is then given by the lift L divided by the area:

$$w=\frac{L}{A}$$

In level flight, the amount of lift is equal to the gross weight.

In a straight trapezoidal wing, such as on the Bell X-1, the thickest part of the wing along its span, the line of maximum chord, runs straight out sideways from root to tip. The leading edge then sweeps backwards and the trailing edge sweeps forward. In a swept trapezoidal wing, the line of maximum chord is swept at an angle, usually forward. This increases the sweep of the leading edge and decreases the sweep of the trailing edge, and in the extreme case both edges sweep backwards by different amounts. The transition form, where the trailing edge is straight, is equivalent to a cropped delta planform.

== High-speed trapezoidal wing ==
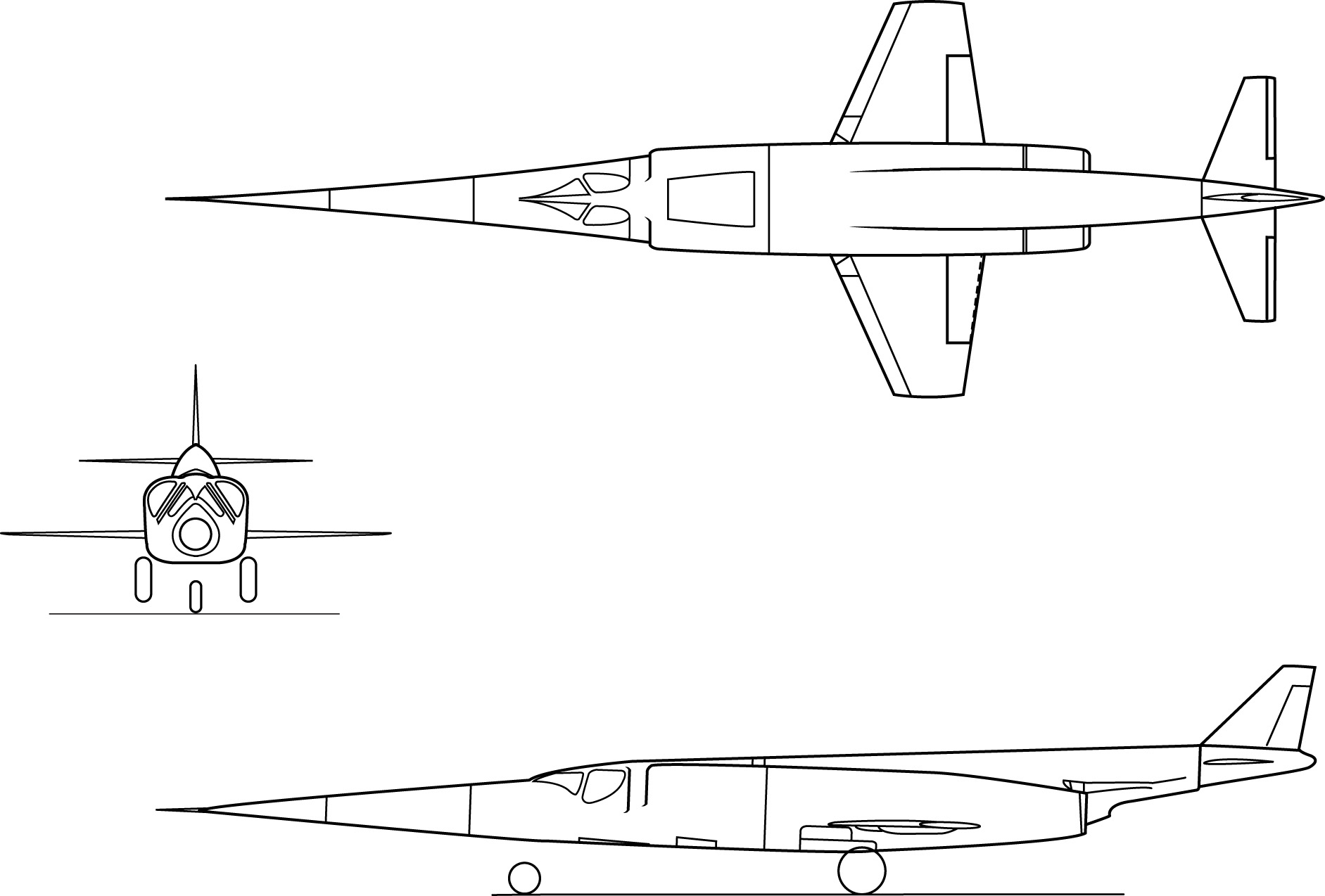
Douglas X-3 Stiletto

At supersonic speeds a thin, small and highly loaded wing offers substantially lower drag than other configurations. Low span and an unswept, tapered planform reduce structural stresses, allowing the wing to be made thin. For minimum drag, wing loading can be in excess of 400 kilograms per square metre (82 lb/sq ft).

Early examples provided a solution to the problem of supersonic flight when engine power was limited. They were made so thin that they had to be machined from a thick, solid sheet of metal. Even with this low-drag wing the Douglas X-3 Stiletto was too underpowered to reach its design flight speed of Mach 2, but the design of its simple hexagonal-airfoil wing was developed for various other X-planes and for Lockheed's widely produced F-104 Starfighter Mach 2.2 high-altitude interceptor.

The small wing of the Starfighter was found to have good gust response at low level, providing a smooth ride at high subsonic speeds. Consequently, the type was adopted for the ground-attack role, notably by the German Luftwaffe. However, the high loading of the wing resulted in a high stalling speed with marginal take-off and landing characteristics and a corresponding high level of takeoff and landing accidents.

A variant with a curved airfoil, blunt trailing edge and conventional internal structure was developed for the North American X-15 rocket plane.

Lockheed continued to use the basic design on many of its aircraft proposals in the 1950s, including the Lockheed CL-400 Suntan and early versions of their supersonic transport designs.

=== High-speed examples ===
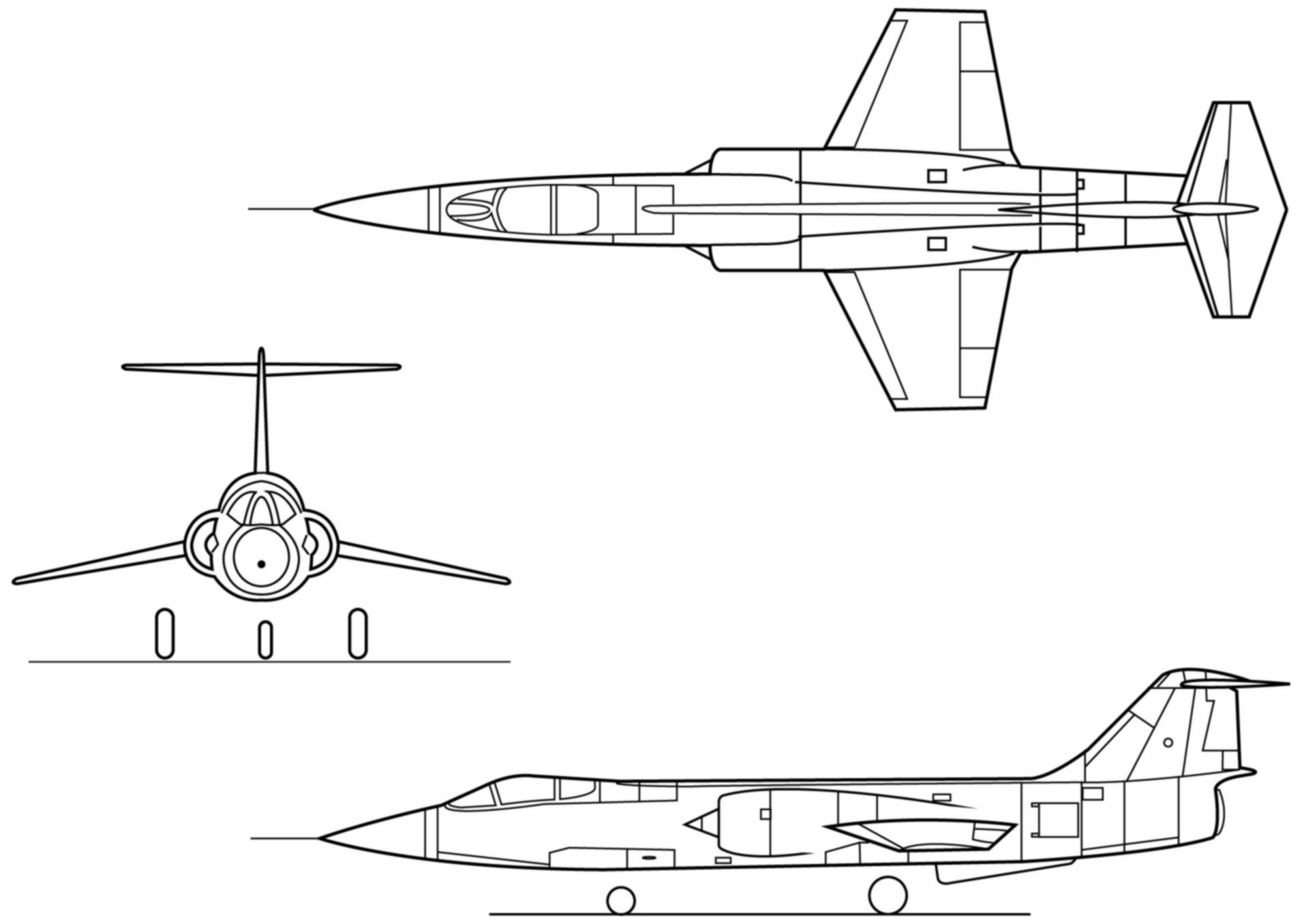
Lockheed F-104 Starfighter

X-planes

- Douglas X-3 Stiletto
- Lockheed X-7
- North American X-15
- Lockheed X-27 project.

Military planes

- Lockheed F-104 Starfighter

== See also ==
- Sweep theory
