= Bill Bridgeman =

American test pilot (1916–1968)

William B. Bridgeman
- Born: William Burton Bridgeman; June 25, 1916; Ottumwa, Iowa, U.S.
- Died: September 29, 1968 (aged 52); Santa Catalina Island, California, U.S.
- Education: University of California (BS)
- Occupation: Test pilot
- Space career

USAF astronaut
- Selection: 1958 MISS Group
- Mission: None
- Military career
- Allegiance: United States of America
- Branch: United States Navy
- Service years: 1941–1947
- Conflicts: World War II; Pearl Harbor; Pacific War

William Barton Bridgeman (June 25, 1916 – September 29, 1968) was an American test pilot who broke aviation records while working for the Douglas Aircraft Company, testing experimental aircraft. In July 1951, the United States Navy announced the D-558-II Skyrocket piloted by Bridgeman had "attained the highest speed and altitude ever recorded by a piloted plane". On August 15 of the same year, he set a world record with a speed of Mach 1.88 and an unofficial record height of 79,494 feet (24,230 m).

Bridgeman was born in Ottumwa, Iowa. His father was a barnstormer and separated from his mother shortly after he was born. He was raised in Malibu, California by his paternal grandmother and majored in geology in college, receiving his Bachelor of Science degree from the University of California.

He enlisted in the United States Navy to attend flight school at Pensacola. He graduated and was commissioned in 1941, and was sent to Pearl Harbor, where he experienced the Japanese attack on December 7. He flew PBY flying boats in the New Guinea/Australia sector, then four-engined PB4Y-2 Privateer patrol bombers on a tour of operations with VP/VPB-109 (the "Reluctant Raiders"). He was reassigned afterwards to training activities stateside from August 1944 until the end of the war, then spent two years flying transport missions from Pearl Harbor to the West Coast.

Upon leaving the Navy in 1947, Bridgeman joined Southwest Airways (a local West Coast airline that eventually became Pacific Air Lines, not to be confused with today's Southwest) to fly DC-3s on the San Francisco-Seattle route. Bored with the airline routine, he left in 1949 to join Douglas as a production test pilot to certify A-1 Skyraiders off the assembly line before their delivery to the Navy. A few months later, he accepted an offer to take over the test program of the D-558 II Skyrocket, one of the world's first supersonic research aircraft.

Bridgeman converted to jet aircraft on the F-80 in early 1950 and eventually conducted a very successful test program with the Skyrocket, collecting data on the behavior of swept-wing aircraft over a wide envelope of load factors and Mach numbers deep in the supersonic range. In May 1951, he broke the world speed record, achieving a speed of Mach 1.72, then broke the record again, reaching Mach 1.88 (1,245 mph, 1,992 km/h) the next month. Immediately afterwards, he broke the world altitude record with 79,494 ft (24,230 m) on the Skyrocket's final flight before delivery to NACA. During this campaign, Bridgeman was one of the first pilots to encounter the phenomenon of inertia coupling, a flight hazard that would dominate high-speed aircraft research for much of the 1950s. He was on the cover of the April 27, 1953, Time magazine.

He appeared as a contestant on the You Bet Your Life radio program on October 29, 1952.

He went on to fly other Douglas test programs including the X-3 Stiletto, a promising but ultimately unsuccessful design. In 1955, he recounted his experiences test-flying the Skyraider and Skyrocket in a successful memoir, The Lonely Sky, written with Jacqueline Hazard, whom he married shortly after the book was published.

He was an astronaut candidate for the United States Air Force Man In Space Soonest program, but the program was cancelled on August 1, 1958, and replaced by NASA's Project Mercury.

Bridgeman eventually moved to Grumman Aircraft where he conducted test programs of commercial aircraft, then pursued a career in commercial real estate. In September 1968, he was the pilot of a routine air-taxi flight from Los Angeles to Santa Catalina Island when his Grumman Goose amphibian went down in the Pacific Ocean. His body was never found.

Preceded by Explorer II	Human altitude record 1951-1953	Succeeded by Marion Eugene Carl
