= Questair Venture =

American homebuilt aircraft

Questair Venture & Spirit
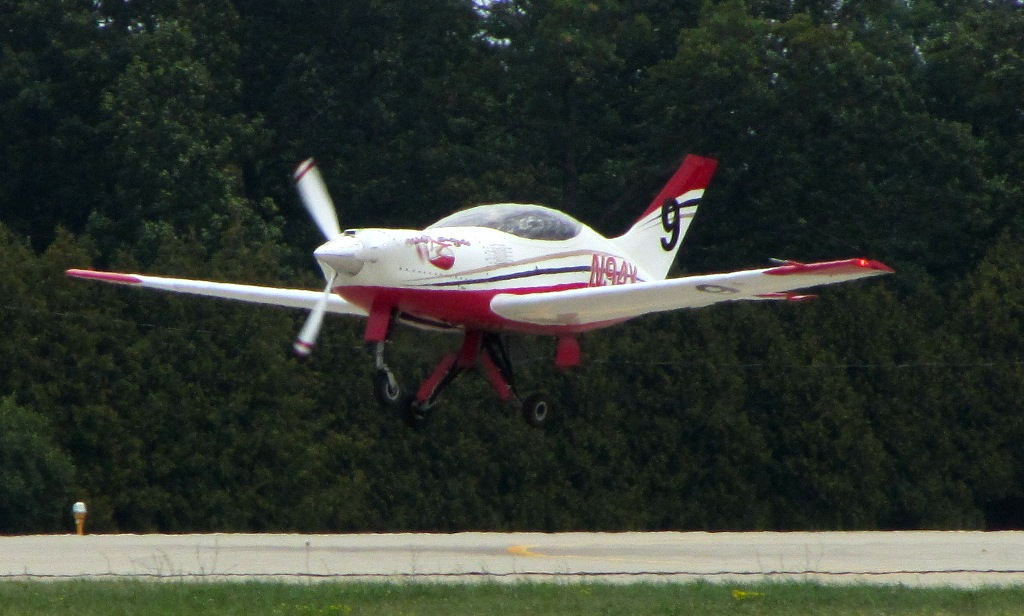
- Questair Venture landing

General information
- Type: Kit aircraft
- National origin: United States
- Manufacturer: Questair
- Designer: Jim Griswold
- Status: In production
- Number built: 62 (2011)

History
- First flight: 1 July 1987

The Questair Venture is a homebuilt aircraft manufactured by Questair at John Bell Williams Airport in Bolton, Mississippi, United States. The aircraft first flew on 1 July 1987.

== Development ==
Questair, Inc. was founded by Ed MacDonough and Jim Griswold in the mid 1980s. The Venture was designed by Griswold, a former chief engineer with Piper Aircraft, and used technology from the Piper Malibu, which Griswold also led the design for. The layout of the design was intended to combine a large two-seat side-by-side cabin with rear baggage space in the smallest possible airframe, having a highly streamlined design.

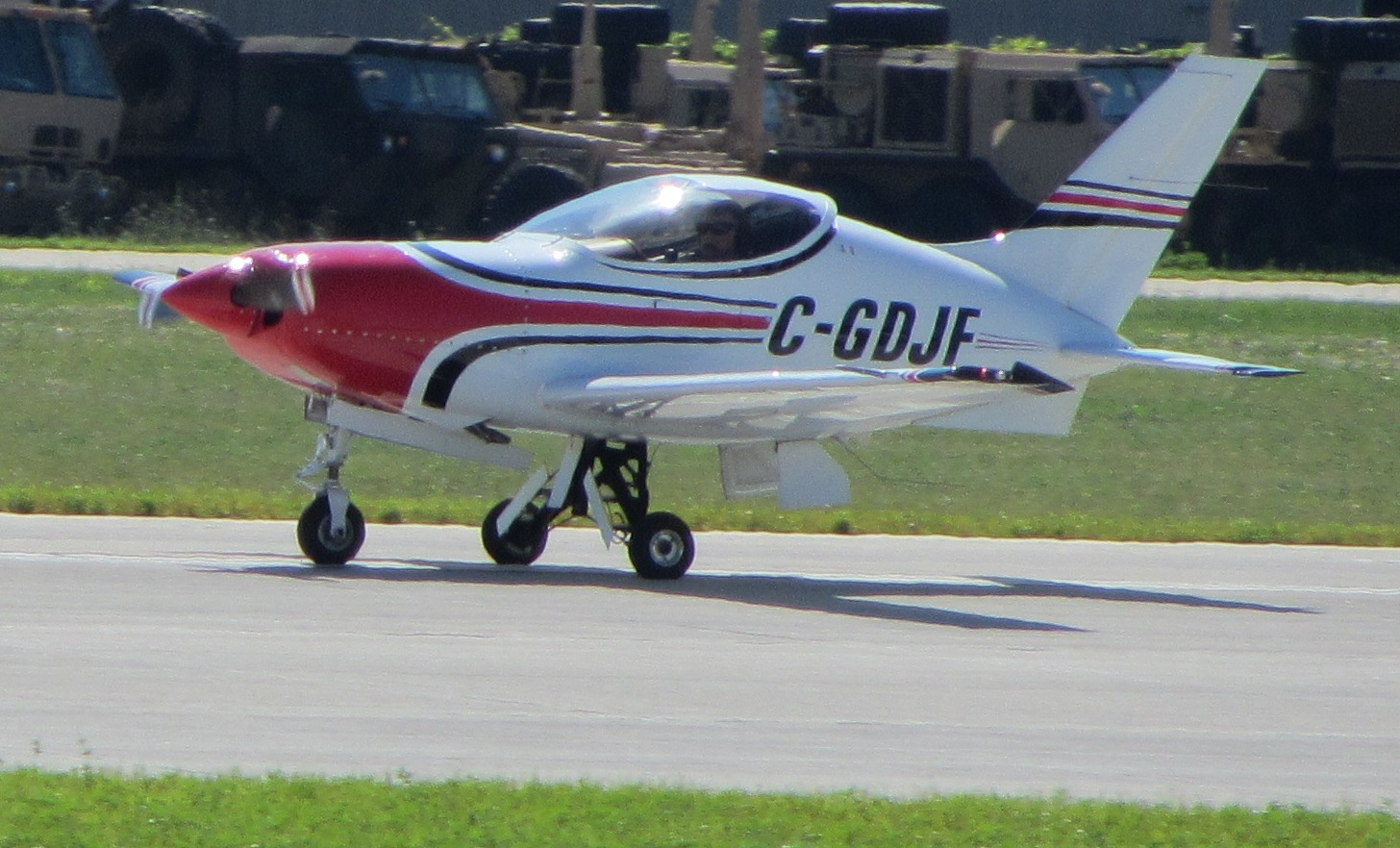
Questair Venture

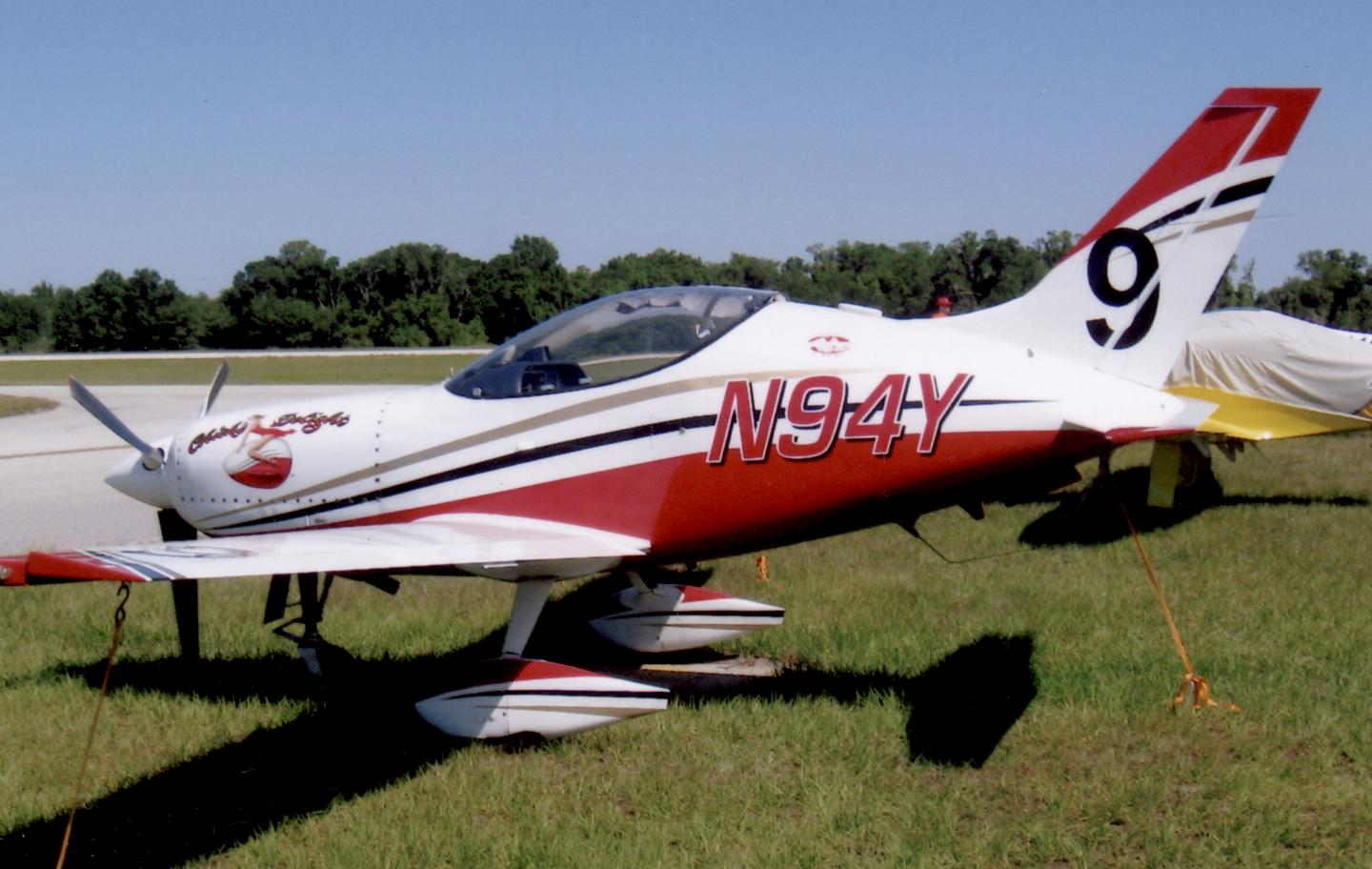
Questair Spirit with fixed undercarriage at Sun N' Fun Lakeland, Florida in April 2009

The aircraft is of all-metal construction using pre-formed multi-curvature panels and is supplied as a kit to homebuilders. The Venture has a complex tricycle retractable undercarriage, but the Spirit version has a fixed spatted wheel fairings on the main landing gear, the nose landing gear remaining retractable. The engine is a Continental IO-550-G, designed specifically for the aircraft.

== Operational history ==
The first Venture made its maiden flight on 1 July 1987, and in 1991 it was followed by the Questair Spirit which had an optional third rear seat as well as fixed tricycle undercarriage. Both types have been built from kits by amateur constructors and over 30 had been completed by 2001. In 1991, a Questair Venture set a time-to-climb record for its class of two minutes, thirty-one seconds to reach 3000 meters. The record stood until broken in 1999 by the custom-built Bohannon B-1.

In June 1989 the Venture set three FAI speed records for piston aircraft weighing less than 1000 kg:

- 331 miles/hour average for four 3-km runs at low altitude (beat by the Nemesis NXT in 2008)
- 305 mph for a 100-km circuit
- 284 mph for a 1000-km circuit

The 100-km and 1000-km records still stand in 2023.

== Aircraft on display ==
- EAA AirVenture Museum, Oshkosh, Wisconsin, second prototype Venture

== Specifications (Venture) ==
Data from Simpson, 2001, p. 455 and Kitplanes

General characteristics

- Crew: one
- Capacity: one passenger
- Length: 16 ft 3 in (4.95 m)
- Wingspan: 27 ft 6 in (8.38 m)
- Height: 7 ft 8 in (2.34 m)
- Wing area: 72.7 sq ft (6.75 m^{2})
- Aspect ratio: 10.4
- Airfoil: Root: NACA 23017 Wing Tip: NACA 23010
- Empty weight: 1,200 lb (544 kg)
- Gross weight: 2,000 lb (907 kg)
- Fuel capacity: 56 U.S. gallons (210 L; 47 imp gal)
- Powerplant: 1 × Continental IO-550-G six cylinder, air-cooled, four stroke aircraft engine, 310 hp (230 kW)

Performance

- Maximum speed: 305 mph (491 km/h, 265 kn)
- Cruise speed: 275 mph (443 km/h, 239 kn)
- Stall speed: 70 mph (110 km/h, 58 kn)
- Range: 1,150 mi (1,850 km, 1,000 nmi)
- Rate of climb: 2,500 ft/min (13 m/s)
- Wing loading: 27.5 lb/sq ft (134 kg/m^{2})

== See also ==
Aircraft of comparable role, configuration, and era

- DarkAero 1
