= Inertia coupling =

Abrupt change in an aircraft's roll due to fuselage inertia

In aeronautics, inertia coupling, also referred to as inertial coupling and inertial roll coupling, is a potentially catastrophic phenomenon of high-speed flight in a long, thin aircraft, in which an intentional rotation of the aircraft about one axis prevents the aircraft's design from inhibiting other unintended rotations. The problem became apparent in the 1950s, when the first supersonic jet fighter aircraft and research aircraft were developed with narrow wingspans, and caused the loss of aircraft and pilots before the design features to counter it (e.g. a big enough fin) were understood.

The term "inertia/inertial coupling" has been criticized as misleading, because the phenomenon is not solely an instability of inertial movement, like the Janibekov effect. Instead, the phenomenon arises because aerodynamic forces react too slowly to track an aircraft's orientation. At low speeds and thick air, aerodynamic forces match aircraft translational velocity to orientation, avoiding the dangerous dynamical regime. But at high speeds or thin air, the wing and empennage may not generate sufficient forces and moments to stabilize the aircraft.

== Description ==
Inertia coupling tends to occur in aircraft with a long, slender, high-density fuselage. A simple, yet accurate mental model describing the aircraft's mass distribution is a rhombus of point masses: one large mass fore and aft, and a small one on each wing. The inertia tensor that this distribution generates has a large yaw component and small pitch and roll components, with the pitch component slightly larger.

Euler's equations govern the rotation of an aircraft. When ω_{r}, the angular rate of roll, is controlled by the aircraft, then the other rotations must satisfy
$$\begin{align}
I_\text{y}\dot{\omega_\text{y}}&=(I_\text{p}-I_\text{r})\omega_\text{r}\omega_\text{p}+T_y \\
I_\text{p}\dot{\omega_\text{p}}&=-(I_\text{y}-I_\text{r})\omega_\text{r}\omega_\text{y}+T_p
\end{align}$$
where y, p, and r indicate yaw, pitch, and roll; I is the moment of inertia along an axis; T the external torque from aerodynamic forces along an axis; and dots indicate time derivatives. When aerodynamic forces are absent, this 2‑variable system is the equation of a simple harmonic oscillator with frequency (1-I_{r}/I_{p})(1-I_{r}/I_{y})ω^{2}_{r}: a rolling Space Shuttle will naturally undergo small oscillations in pitch and yaw.

Conversely, when the craft does not roll at all (ω_{r}=0), the only terms on the right-hand side are the aerodynamic torques, which are (at small angles) proportional to the craft's angular orientation θ to the freestream air. That is: there are natural constants k such that an unrolling aircraft experiences
$$\begin{align}
I_\text{y}\dot{\omega_\text{y}}&=T_y=-k_\text{y}I_\text{y}\theta_\text{y} \\
I_\text{p}\dot{\omega_\text{p}}&=T_p=-k_\text{p}I_\text{p}\theta_\text{p}
\end{align}$$

In the full case of a rolling aircraft, the connection between orientation and angular velocity is not entirely straightforward, because the aircraft is a rotating reference frame. The roll inherently exchanges yaw for pitch and vice-versa:
$$\begin{align}
\dot{\theta_\text{y}}&=\omega_\text{y}+\omega_\text{r}\theta_\text{p} \\
\dot{\theta_\text{p}}&=\omega_\text{p}-\omega_\text{r}\theta_\text{y}
\end{align}$$
Assuming nonzero roll, time can always be rescaled so that ω_{r}=1. The full equations of the body are then of two damped, coupled harmonic oscillators:
$$\begin{align}
0&=\ddot{\theta_\text{y}}-(1+J_\text{y})\dot{\theta_\text{p}}+(k_\text{y}-J_\text{y})\theta_\text{y} \\
0&=\ddot{\theta_\text{p}}+(1-J_\text{p})\dot{\theta_\text{y}}+(k_\text{p}-J_\text{p})\theta_\text{p}
\end{align}$$
where
$$\begin{align}
J_\text{y}&=\frac{I_\text{p}-I_\text{r}}{I_\text{y}} \\
J_\text{p}&=\frac{I_\text{y}-I_\text{r}}{I_\text{p}}
\end{align}$$
But if k≈J in either axis, then the damping is eliminated and the system is unstable.

In dimensional terms (that is, unscaled time), instability requires k≈Jω_{r}. Since I_{r} is small,
$$J_\text{y}J_\text{p}\approx1$$
In particular, one J is at least 1. In thick air, k are too large to matter. But in thin air and supersonic speeds, they decrease, and may become comparable to ω_{r} during a rapid roll.

Techniques to prevent inertial roll coupling include increased directional stability (k) and reduced roll rate (ω_{r}). Alternatively, the unstable aircraft dynamics may be mitigated: the unstable modes require time to grow, and a sufficiently short-duration roll at limited angle of attack may allow recovery to a controlled state post-roll.

== Early history ==
In 1948, William Phillips described inertial roll coupling in the context of missiles in an NACA report. However, his predictions appeared primarily theoretical in the case of planes. The violent motions he predicted were first seen in the X-series research aircraft and Century-series fighter aircraft in the early 1950s. Before this time, aircraft tended to have greater width than length, and their mass was generally distributed closer to the center of mass. This was especially true for propeller aircraft, but equally true for early jet fighters as well. The effect became obvious only when aircraft began to sacrifice aerodynamic surface area to reduce drag, and use longer fineness ratios to reduce supersonic drag. Such aircraft were generally much more fuselage-heavy, allowing gyroscopic effects to overwhelm the small control surfaces.

The roll coupling study of the X-3 Stiletto, first flown in 1952, was extremely short but produced valuable data. Abrupt aileron rolls were conducted at Mach 0.92 and 1.05 and produced "disturbing" motions and excessive accelerations and loads.

In 1953, inertial roll coupling nearly killed Chuck Yeager in the X-1A.

Inertial roll coupling was one of three distinct coupling modes that followed one another as the rocket-powered Bell X-2 hit Mach 3.2 during a flight on 27 September 1956, killing pilot Captain Mel Apt. Although simulators had predicted that Apt's maneuvers would produce an uncontrollable flight regime, at the time most pilots did not believe that the simulators accurately modeled the plane's flight characteristics.

The first two production aircraft to experience inertial roll coupling were the F-100 Super Sabre and F-102 Delta Dagger (both first flown in 1953). The F-100 was modified with a larger vertical tail to increase its directional stability. The F-102 was modified to increase wing and tail areas and was fitted with an augmented control system. To enable pilot control during dynamic motion maneuvers the tail area of the F-102A was increased 40%.

In the case of the F-101 Voodoo (first flown in 1954), a stability augmentation system was retrofitted to the A models to help combat this problem.

The Douglas Skyray was not able to incorporate any design changes to control inertial roll coupling and instead had restricted maneuver limits at which coupling effects did not cause problems.

The Lockheed F-104 Starfighter (first flown in 1956) had its stabilator (horizontal tail surface) mounted atop its vertical fin to reduce inertia coupling.

== See also ==
- Upset Prevention and Recovery Training
