= List of X-2 flights =

== X-2 pilots ==
Pilot	Agency	Flights	Aircraft
Jean Ziegler	Bell	2	46-675
Milburn Apt	USAF	1	46-674
Frank Everest	USAF	13	46-675, 46-674
Iven Kincheloe	USAF	4	46-674

== X-2 flights ==
Vehicle Flight #	Date	Pilot	Aircraft	Agency	Velocity -Mach-	Altitude: m -	Comments
X-2 #1	June 27, 1952	Jean Ziegler	46-675	Bell 1 #2	?	?	Pilot familiarization. Glide flight. Nose gear collapsed on landing.
X-2 #2	October 8, 1952	Jean Ziegler	46-675	Bell 2 #2	?	?	Glide flight.
X-2 #3	October 10, 1952	Frank Everest	46-675	USAF 1	?	?	Glide flight. Landing skid did not fully extend. Touchdown jarred it into place.
X-2 #4	August 5, 1954	Frank Everest	46-674	USAF 2	?	?	Glide flight. Rough landing, minor damage.
X-2 #5	March 8, 1955	Frank Everest	46-674	USAF 3	?	?	Glide flight. Check propellant system. Aircraft unstable on landing. Damaged.
X-2 #6	April 6, 1955	Frank Everest	46-674	USAF 4	?	?	Glide flight. Aircraft unstable on landing. Damaged. Returned to Bell for landing gear modifications.
X-2 #7	October 25, 1955	Frank Everest	46-674	USAF 5	?	?	First attempt at a powered flight. Nitrogen leak. Mission completed as a glide flight.
X-2 #8	November 18, 1955	Frank Everest	46-674	USAF 6	0.992	10,675	First powered flight. Only 5,000 lbf (22 kN) thrust chamber ignited. Small engine fire.
X-2 #9	March 24, 1956	Frank Everest	46-674	USAF 7	0.91	?	Second powered flight. Only 10,000 lbf (44 kN) thrust chamber ignited.
X-2 #10	April 25, 1956	Frank Everest	46-674	USAF 8	1.40	15,250	Third powered flight. First supersonic flight. Both chambers ignited.
X-2 #11	May 1, 1956	Frank Everest	46-674	USAF 9	1.683	16,378	Fourth powered flight.
X-2 #12	May 11, 1956	Frank Everest	46-674	USAF 10	1.8	18,300	Fifth powered flight.
X-2 #13	May 22, 1956	Frank Everest	46-674	USAF 11	2.53	17,803	Sixth powered flight.
X-2 #14	May 25, 1956	Iven Kincheloe	46-674	USAF 12	1.0+	?	Seventh powered flight. Pilot familiarization. Supersonic flight.
X-2 #15	July 12, 1956	Frank Everest	46-674	USAF 13	1.0	?	Eighth powered flight. Supersonic flight. Premature engine shutdown.
X-2 #16	July 23, 1956	Frank Everest	46-674	USAF 14	2.87	20,802	Ninth powered flight. High speed flight.
X-2 #17	August 3, 1956	Iven Kincheloe	46-674	USAF 15	2.5+	26,764	Tenth powered flight. High altitude flight.
X-2 #18	August 8, 1956	Iven Kincheloe	46-674	USAF 16	?	21,336	Eleventh powered flight. High altitude flight. Premature engine shutdown.
X-2 #19	September 7, 1956	Iven Kincheloe	46-674	USAF 17	1.7	38,491	Twelfth powered flight. High altitude flight. Altitude record for that time.
X-2 #20	September 27, 1956	Milburn Apt	46-674	USAF 18	3.196	31,946	Thirteenth powered flight. Record speed. Aircraft crashed. Pilot killed.

== See also ==
- Bell X-2
- Jean "Skip" Ziegler
- Frank Kendall Everest, Jr.
- Milburn Apt
- Iven Kincheloe
