= Sharman Apt Russell =

American science writer

- Born: Sharman Apt; July 23, 1954 (age 72); Edwards Air Force Base, California, United States
- Education: University of California, Berkeley, University of Montana
- Occupations: novelist, essayist
- Spouse: Peter Russell
- Relatives: Milburn G. Apt (father)
- Writing career
- Period: 1980s to present
- Website: www.sharmanaptrussell.com

Sharman Apt Russell (born July 23, 1954) is a nature and science writer based in New Mexico. She has written fourteen books on topics such as citizen science, living in place, public lands grazing, archaeology, flowers, butterflies, hunger, and Pantheism. Her work has been recognized as "an expert blend of scientific reportage, world history and moral commentary". Among her awards is the John Burroughs Medal for distinguished nature writing.

== Biography ==
Russell was born Sharman Apt at Edwards Air Force Base in the Mojave Desert in 1954 and was raised in Phoenix, Arizona, where she attended Central High School. She settled in rural New Mexico, near Silver City, in 1981. She is married to Peter Russell and has two children. She is the daughter of test pilot Milburn G. Apt, who was killed while testing the Bell X-2 in 1956, when she was two.

Russell received her B.S. in conservation and natural resources from the University of California, Berkeley and her MFA in creative writing from the University of Montana. She is a professor emerita in the Humanities Department at Western New Mexico University in Silver City, where she teaches writing for graduate students. She has also taught in the low-residency MFA program at Antioch University in Los Angeles since 1998.

== Career ==
Russell's essays and short stories have been widely published and anthologized. Her collections of essays Songs of the Fluteplayer: Seasons of Life in the Southwest (Addison-Wesley, 1991) won the 1992 Mountains and Plains Booksellers Award and New Mexico Zia Award and recounts her years as a back-to-the-lander in rural New Mexico. Her next two books on public lands grazing and American archeology continued her exploration of creative nonfiction, mixing personal voice with what she would come to call research-based prose.

Russell's two books on pollination ecology were often praised for their lyricism. Anatomy of a Rose: Exploring the Secret Life of Flowers (Perseus Books, 2001) has been translated into Korean, Chinese, Swedish, German, Spanish, and Portuguese. An Obsession with Butterflies: Our Long Love Affair with a Singular Insect (Perseus Books, 2003) was a pick of independent booksellers in the Summer 2003 Book Sense 76 and was translated into Russian, Chinese, and Korean.

Russell next turned to what would be a long-standing interest of hers, hunger and childhood malnutrition. Hunger: An Unnatural History (Basic Books, 2005) was the result of a Rockefeller Fellowship at Bellagio, Italy. Among many positive reviews, The Guardian wrote, "This rather grim subject comes to seem profound, thanks to Russell's ruminative prose style and keen intelligence."

An exploration of pantheism, Standing in the Light: My Life as a Pantheist (Basic Books, 2008) was a New Mexico Book Award finalist and one of Booklist's top ten religious books of 2008. Kirkus Reviews had this to say, "A deep reverence for nature shines throughout Russell's rich, enjoyable text" and Publishers Weekly observed, "The uniqueness of this book...lies less in its lyrical passages—which sometimes evoke the early Annie Dillard—than in its concise and readable summaries of pantheistic thought, especially that of Marcus Aurelius, Giordano Bruno, Baruch Spinoza, and Walt Whitman. Russell's faith is all-embracing but unsentimental."

Russell continued to write about whatever engaged her and reflected her daily interests. Her book, Diary of a Citizen Scientist: Chasing Tiger Beetles and Other New Ways of Engaging the World (Oregon State University Press, 2014) won the prestigious 2016 John Burroughs Medal for Distinguished Nature Writing, the 2015 WILLA Award for Creative Nonfiction, and a 2015 New Mexico/Arizona Finalist Award. Diary of a Citizen Scientist was also listed by The Guardian as one of the ten top nature books of 2014.

In 2021, Russell returned to the subject of hunger and malnutrition with Within Our Grasp: Childhood Malnutrition Worldwide and the Revolution Taking Place to End It (Pantheon Books, 2021). Kirkus Reviews wrote, "Mixing history, nutrition science, interviews with experts, and accounts of her visits to aid organizations and projects (with a focus on Malawi), the author delivers an engrossing, modestly optimistic narrative about a sadly evergreen issue." And Library Journal said, "Russell's passion for citizen science, the important subject she explores, and her jargon-free presentation of information relating to malnutrition will open worlds for most readers, from high school students to sociologists."

Russell's most recent nonfiction reflects again her relationship to nature and her everyday life in rural New Mexico. What Walks This Way: Discovering the Animals Around Us Through Their Track and Sign (Columbia University Press, 2024) is an introduction to the basics of identifying wildlife track and sign, a memoir of Russell's experiences in the tracking world, and a call to reform wildlife management in North America. Washington Independent Review of Books observed, "On each page of What Walks This Way, Russell calls on us to learn more, to keep sharp eyes to the ground and stout hearts open to the stubborn abundance and precarious resilience of the wild beings outside our doors."

In her works of fiction, Russell began with The Humpbacked Fluteplayer (Knopf Books for Young Readers, 1994), a fantasy for ages 8–12. The Last Matriarch (University of New Mexico Press, 2000) is a novel about Paleolithic life in New Mexico some 11,000 years ago. Her Young Adult historical fantasy Teresa of the New World (Yucca Publishing) was released in March 2015. Her eco-science-fiction Knocking on Heaven's Door (Yucca Publishing) came out in 2016 and won the New Mexico/Arizona Book Award for Science Fiction and the Arizona Author's Award for Fiction.

Other awards for Russell are a Pushcart Prize, the Henry Joseph Jackson Award, and the Writers at Work Award.

== Works ==
- Songs of the Fluteplayer: Seasons of Life in the Southwest (Addison-Wesley Publishing Company, 1991, reprinted by Open Road Integrated Media, 2022)
- Kill the Cowboy: A Battle of Mythology in the New West (Addison-Wesley, 1993, reprinted by Horseshoe Press, 2016)
- The Humpbacked Fluteplayer (Knopf Publishing for Young Readers, 1994)
- When the Land was Young: Reflections on American Archaeology (Addison-Wesley, 1996, reprinted by Open Road Integrated Media, 2022)
- The Last Matriarch (University of New Mexico Press, 2000, reprinted by Open Road Integrated Media, 2022)
- Anatomy of a Rose: Exploring the Secret Life of Flowers (Perseus Books, 2001). Translated into Korean, Chinese, Swedish, German, Spanish, and Portuguese.
- An Obsession with Butterflies: Our Long Love Affair with a Singular Insect (Perseus Books, 2003). Translated into Russian, Korean, and Chinese.
- Hunger: An Unnatural History (Basic Books, 2005) Translated into Italian.
- Diary of a Citizen Scientist: Chasing Tiger Beetles and Other New Ways of Engaging the World (Oregon State University Press, 2014, reprinted by Open Road Integrated Media, 2022)
- Standing in the Light: My Life as a Pantheist (Basic Books, 2008, reprinted by Horseshoe Press, 2016)
- Teresa of the New World (Skyhorse/Yucca Publishers, 2015)
- Knocking on Heaven's Door (Skyhorse/Yucca Publishers, 2016)
- Within Our Grasp: Childhood Malnutrition Worldwide and the Revolution Taking Place to End It (Pantheon Publishing, 2021)
- What Walks This Way: Discovering the Wildlife Around Us Through Their Tracks and Signs (Columbia University Press, 2024)

== Awards and accolades ==
Among the awards and accolades Russell has received are:

- 1989, Henry Joseph Jackson Award in Nonfiction, San Francisco, CA
- 1989, Writers at Work Fellowship Winner in Nonfiction, Park City, Utah
- 1990, Pushcart Prize, essay "Illegal Aliens" published in Pushcart Prize Anthology XV
- 1992, New Mexico Presswomen's Zia Award for Songs of the Fluteplayer
- 1992, Mountain and Plains Booksellers Award for Songs of the Fluteplayer
- 2002, Rockefeller Foundation Residency, Bellagio, Italy
- 2003, Independent Bookseller Recommendations, Book Sense 76 for An Obsession with Butterflies
- 2003, 2007, 2012 PEN West judge for Children's Literature
- 2009, 2003 WNMU Research Award for Excellence
- 2009, New Mexico Book Awards Finalist Light: My Life as a Pantheist
- 2009, Booklist's Top Ten Books in Religion for Standing in the Light: My Life as a Pantheist
- 2014, One of ten top nature books of 2014, The Guardian
- 2015, New Mexico/Arizona Book Awards Finalist for Diary of a Citizen Scientist and Teresa of the New World
- 2015, Arizona Authors Association Awards Winner for Teresa of the New World
- 2015, WILLA Award for Nonfiction, Women Writing the West, for Diary of a Citizen Scientist
- 2016, May Sarton Young Adult finalist and WILLA Finalist for Children's Literature, Women Writing the West, for Teresa of the New World
- 2016, New Mexico/Arizona Book Awards Winner in science fiction for Knocking on Heaven's Door
- 2016, Arizona Authors Association Awards Winner in fiction for Knocking on Heaven's Door
- 2016 John Burroughs Medal for Distinguished Nature Writing for Diary of a Citizen Scientist
