= Milburn G. Apt =

American test pilot (1924–1956)

Milburn Grant Apt
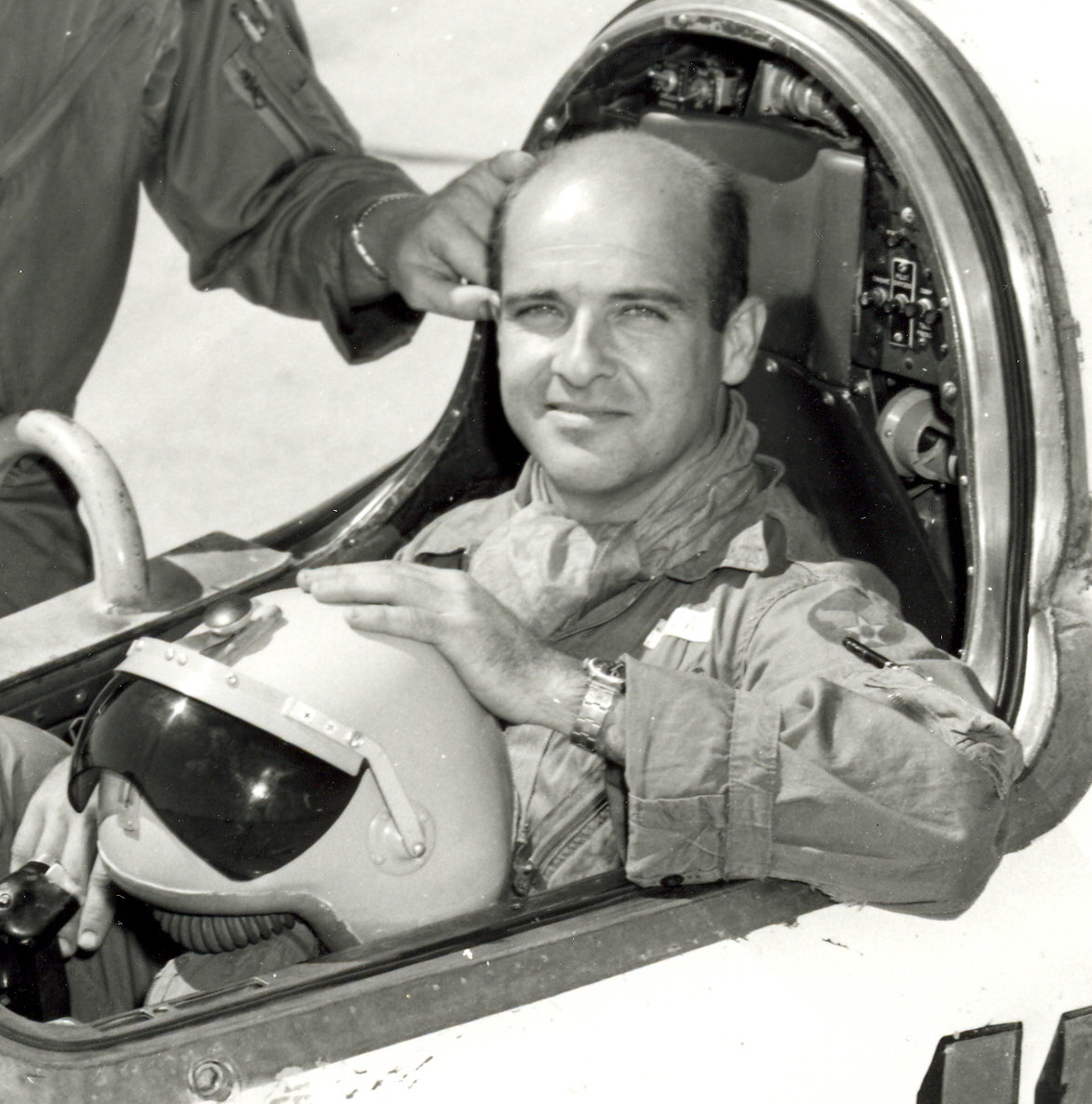
- Captain Mel Apt in the cockpit of the Bell X-2
- Born: April 9, 1924; Buffalo, Kansas, U.S.
- Died: September 27, 1956 (aged 32); Edwards Air Force Base, California, U.S.
- Relatives: Sharman Apt Russell (daughter)
- Military career
- Allegiance: United States of America
- Branch: United States Air Force
- Service years: 1941–1956
- Rank: Captain
- Nickname: Mel
- Awards: Soldier's Medal; Distinguished Flying Cross

Milburn Grant "Mel" Apt (April 9, 1924 – September 27, 1956) was a U.S. Air Force test pilot, and the first man to attain speeds faster than Mach 3. He was killed after separating from the Bell X-2 in his escape capsule during the record-setting flight that exceeded Mach 3. Shortly afterward, Secretary of the Air Force Donald A. Quarles commended Apt, saying he was "flying faster than any human being has been known to fly."

== Early career ==
Apt was born April 9, 1924, in Buffalo, Kansas. He graduated from Buffalo High School in 1942. He joined the U.S. Army Air Forces immediately, was sent to flight school, and was commissioned in February 1944. He served with the Caribbean Defense Command until June 1946. In 1951 he received a Bachelor of Science degree from the University of Kansas as well as a bachelor's degree in Aeronautical Engineering from the U.S. Air Force Institute of Technology. He graduated from the Experimental Flight Test Pilot School at Edwards Air Force Base (Class 54B) in September 1954.

== Test pilot ==
=== Rescue operation ===
Before piloting the X-2 himself, Apt flew chase planes for other test flights. LIFE magazine reported an incident on December 22, 1954, in which Apt rescued Capt. Richard J. Harrer from a Lockheed F-94 Starfire airplane. Harrer's plane had crashed and was on fire. Apt managed to pull Harrer from the wreckage and for his heroism was awarded the Soldier's Medal.

=== Record-breaking X-2 flight ===
The X-2, initially an Air Force program, was scheduled to be transferred to the civilian National Advisory Committee for Aeronautics (NACA) for scientific research. The Air Force delayed turning the aircraft over to the NACA in the hope of attaining Mach 3. The service requested and received a two-month extension to qualify another Air Force test pilot, Apt, in the X-2, and attempt to exceed Mach 3.

On September 27, 1956, Apt made his first and only X-2 flight. The rocket-powered X-2 was launched from a B-50 bomber over the Mojave Desert in California on its 13th powered flight. Apt piloted it to a record speed of 3,377 km (2,098 mi) per hour, or Mach 3.196 at 19,977 m (65,541 ft). Subsequent loss of control from inertia coupling led to the plane's fatal crash.

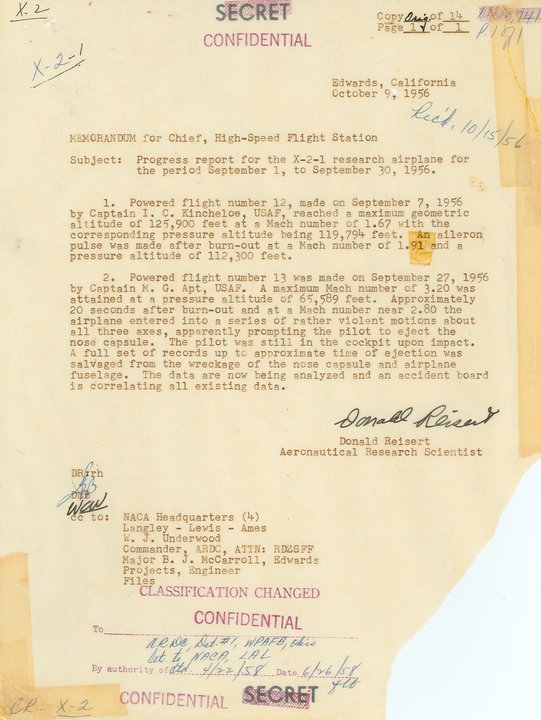
NACA report of X-2-1 flights 12 and 13

In the run-up to his first rocket-plane flight, Apt had several ground briefings in the simulator. His simulator training had indicated control difficulties in high-speed flight, and possible techniques for handling them. He launched from the B-50, quickly outdistancing the F-100 chase planes. At high altitude, he nosed over, accelerating rapidly. At 19,977 m (65,541 ft), the X-2 reached Mach 3.196, making Apt the first man to fly more than three times the speed of sound. Upon rocket burnout, Apt found himself farther from home than anticipated. The planned flight profile called for slowing to Mach 2.4 before turning back to base. The additional time to slow before turning may have put him beyond safe gliding range of his planned runway.

Still above Mach 3, he turned back to Edwards. The X-2 began a series of diverging rolls and tumbled out of control. Apt tried to regain control of the aircraft. Unable to do so, he separated the escape capsule. The capsule's drogue parachute opened, but not its larger parachute. Too late, Apt attempted to bail out and was killed when the capsule hit the Edwards bombing range. According to The New York Times reporting on the event, Lieut. Col. Frank Kendall Everest Jr., an experienced X-2 pilot, had been critical of the relatively new detachable cabin: "Colonel Everest told reporters in Buffalo that a pilot using the detachable device would be thrown against the instrument panel with terrific force when the parachute braked it. He said some safety had been sacrificed in preference to delaying the X-2 flight tests while the escape mechanism was modified."

The rest of the X-2 crashed unmanned five miles away.

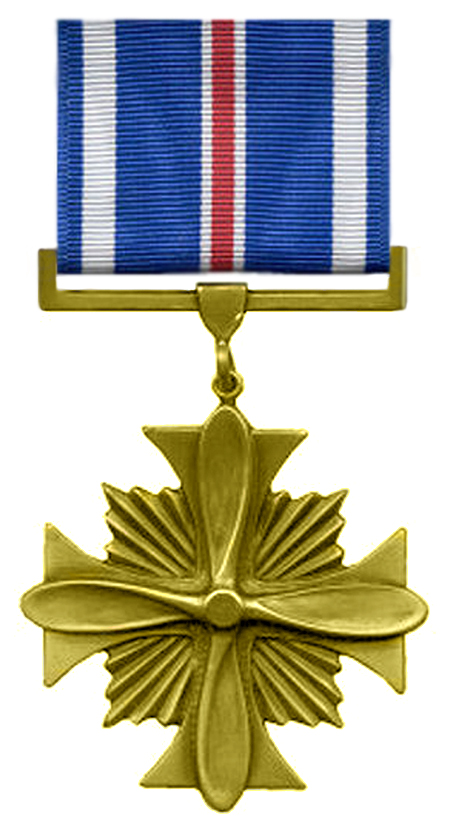
Distinguished Flying Cross (United States)

On March 21, 1957, Apt was posthumously awarded the Distinguished Flying Cross, which is given to those who have distinguished themselves "by valor, heroism, or extraordinary achievement." Prospective X-15 pilots were subsequently shown the on-board film of Apt's fatal crash, taken by a stop-frame camera mounted behind him in the cockpit.

=== Apt and the X-2 he flew (#46-674) ===
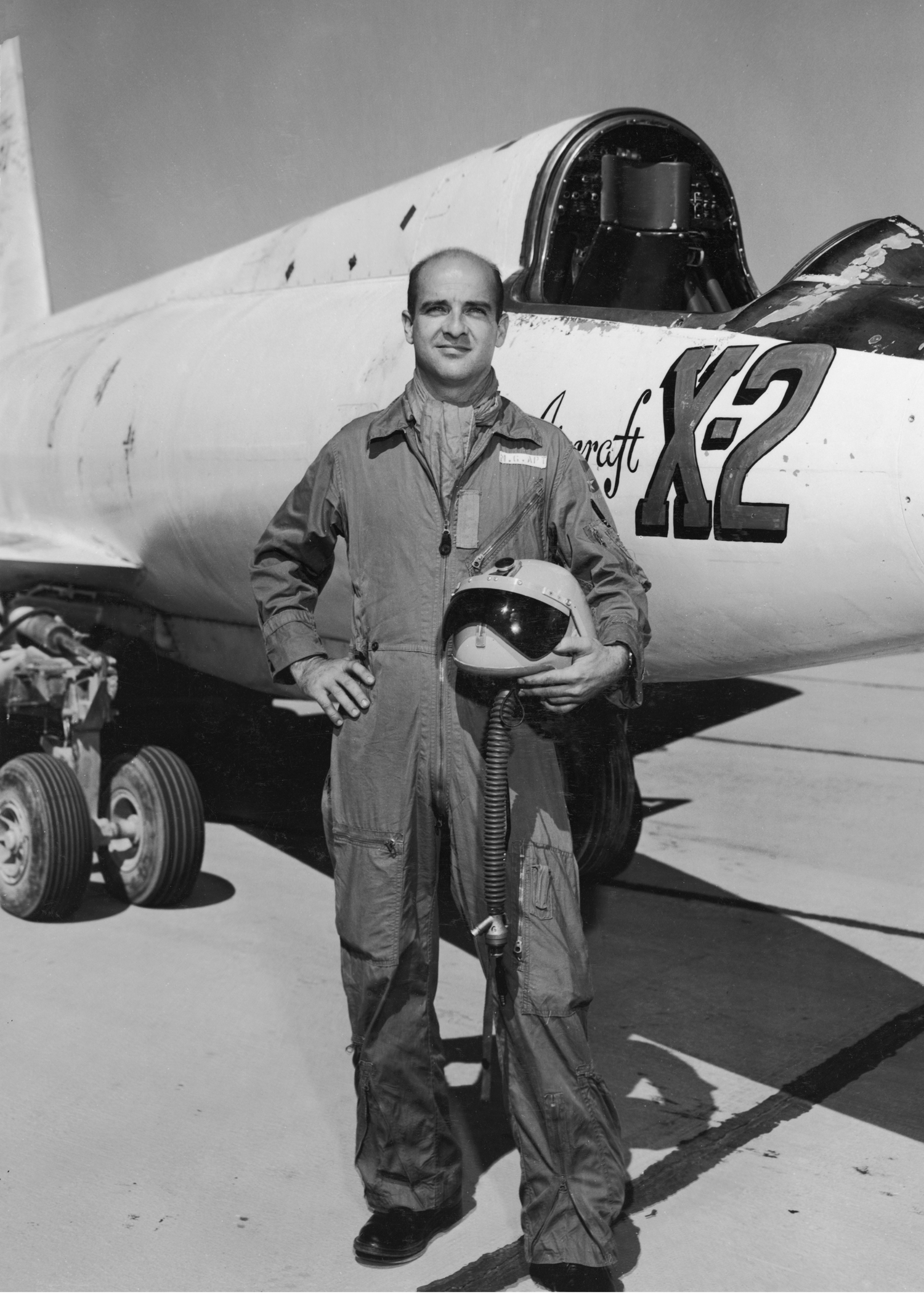
Apt stands beside the X-2.

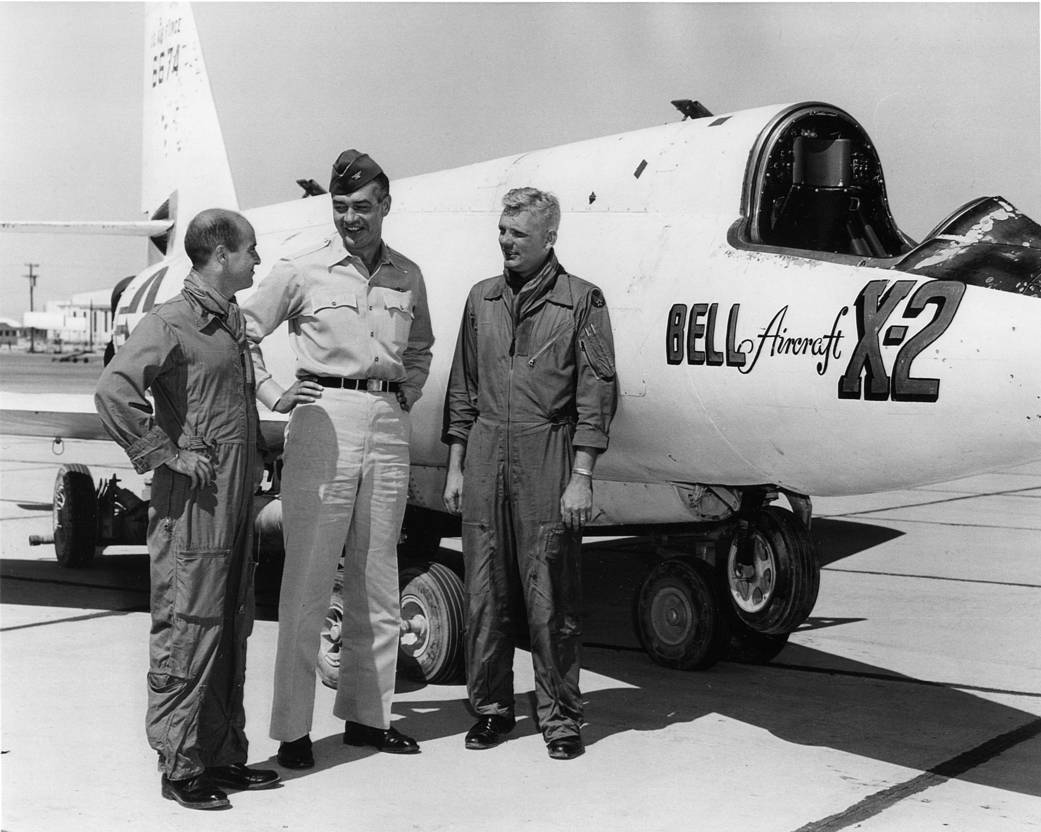
X-2 pilots Capts. Apt and Kincheloe flank Col. Horace Hanes, AFFTC flight test director (1956).

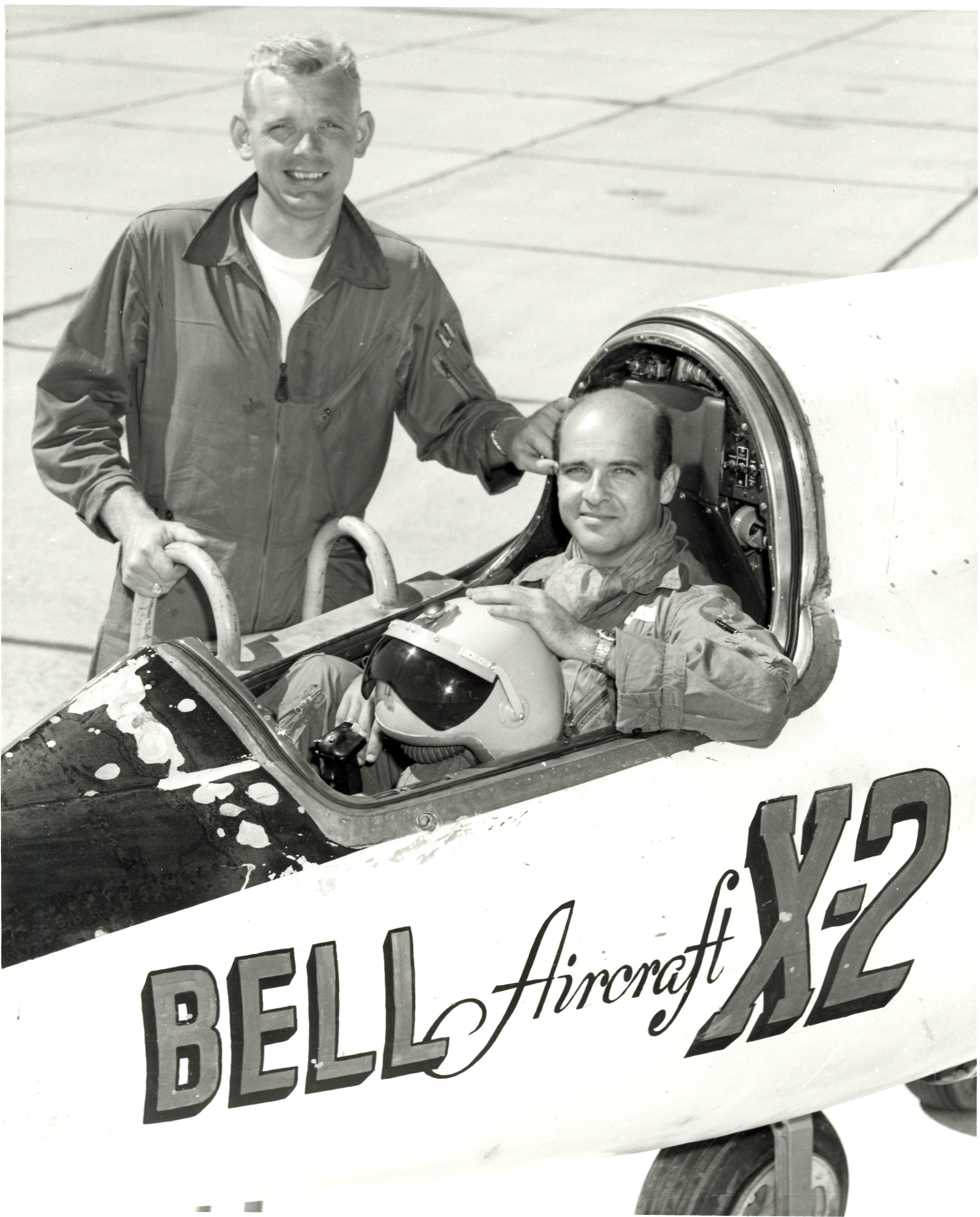
Apt (in cockpit) and Kincheloe.

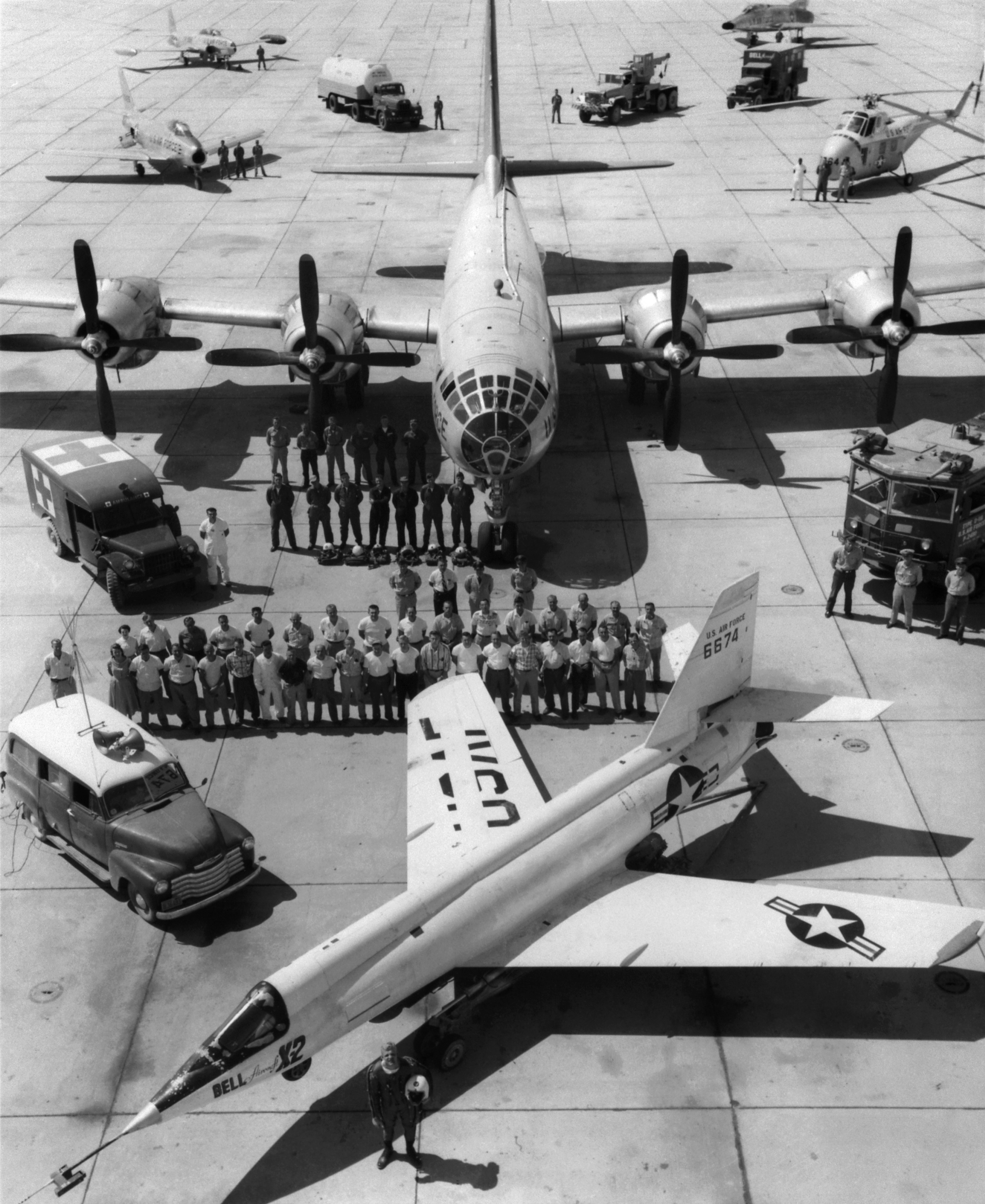
The X-2 at Edwards Air Force Base, surrounded by the B-50 launch aircraft, chase planes, and support crew.

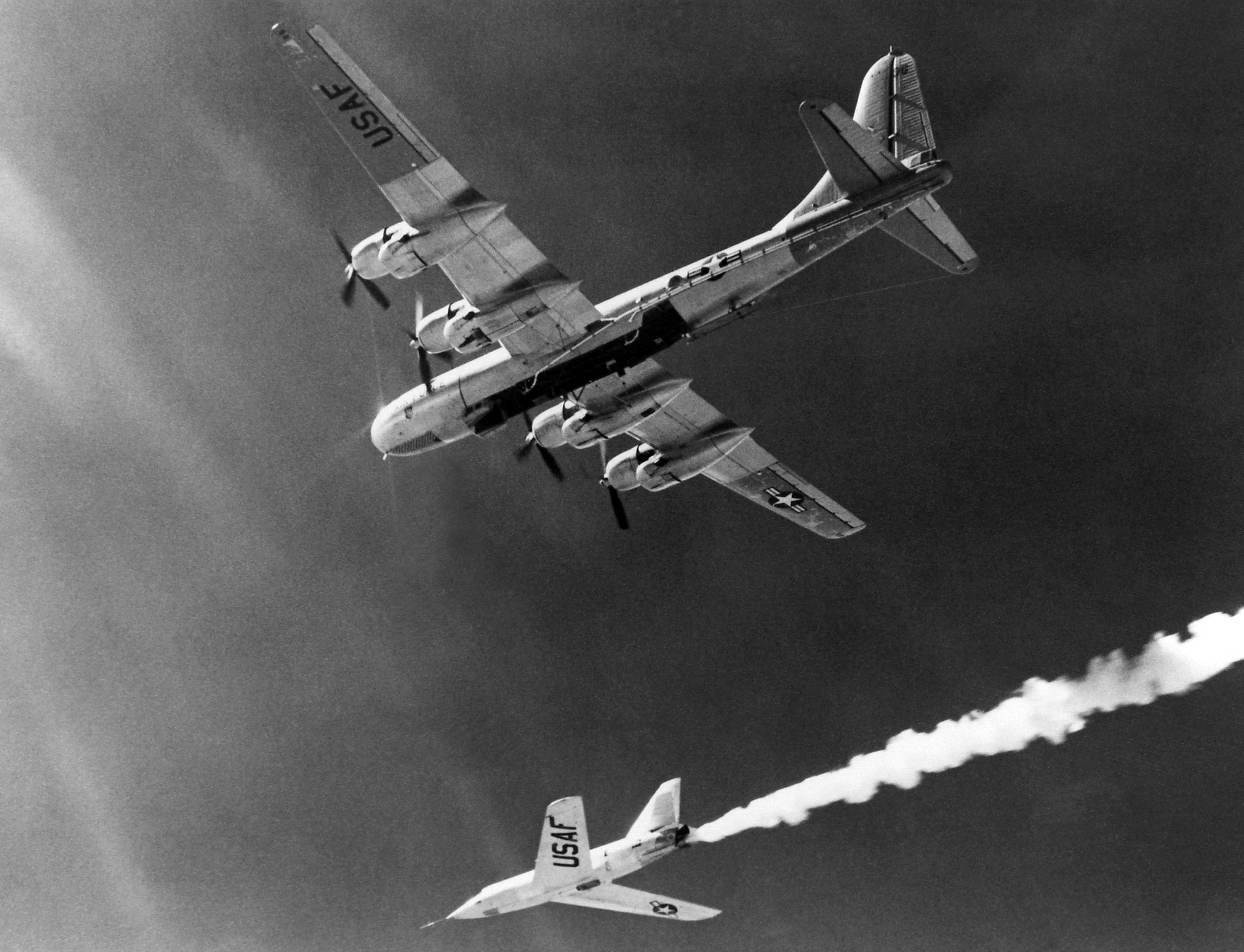
The X-2 drops from its B-50 launch aircraft.

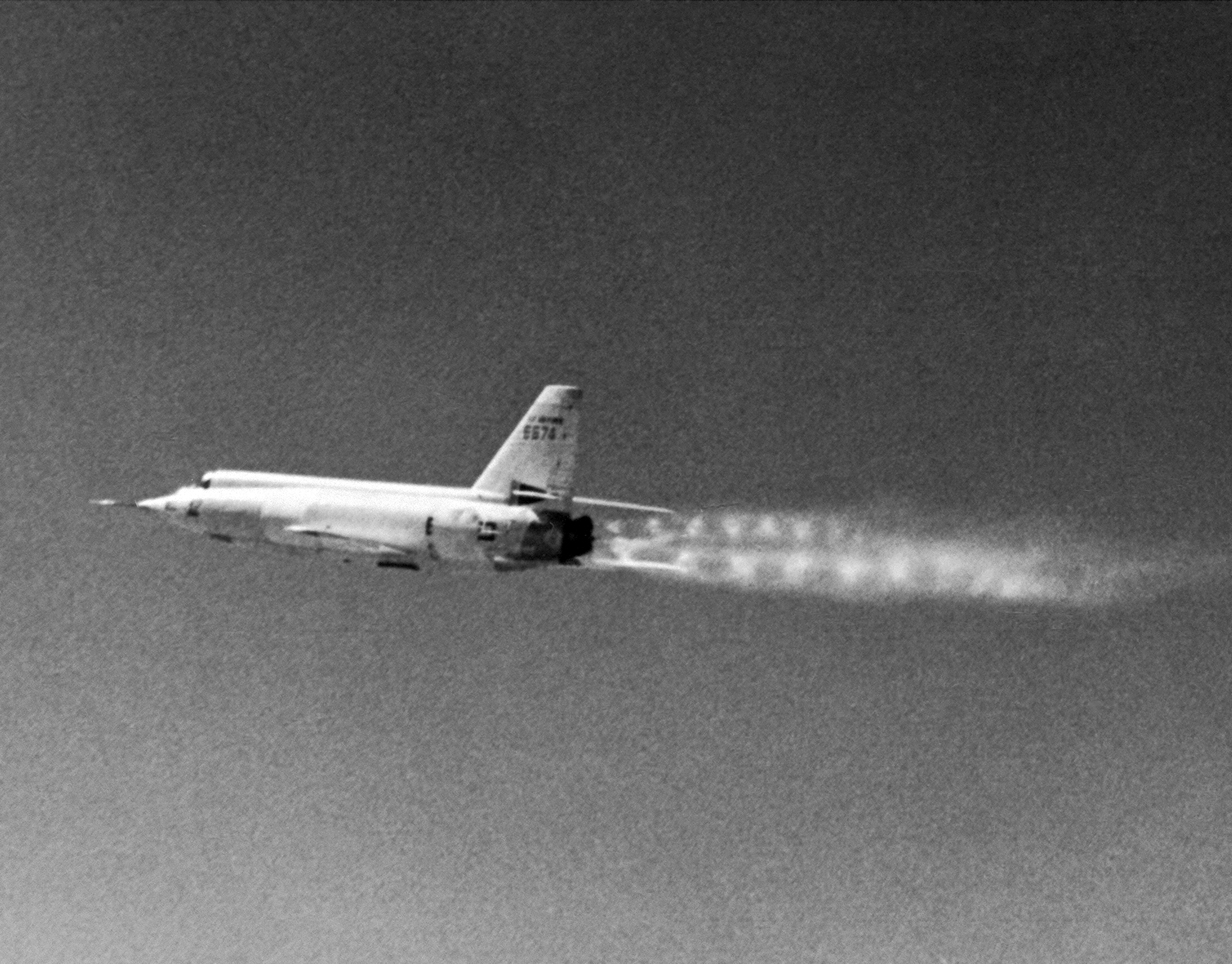
The X-2 in-flight.

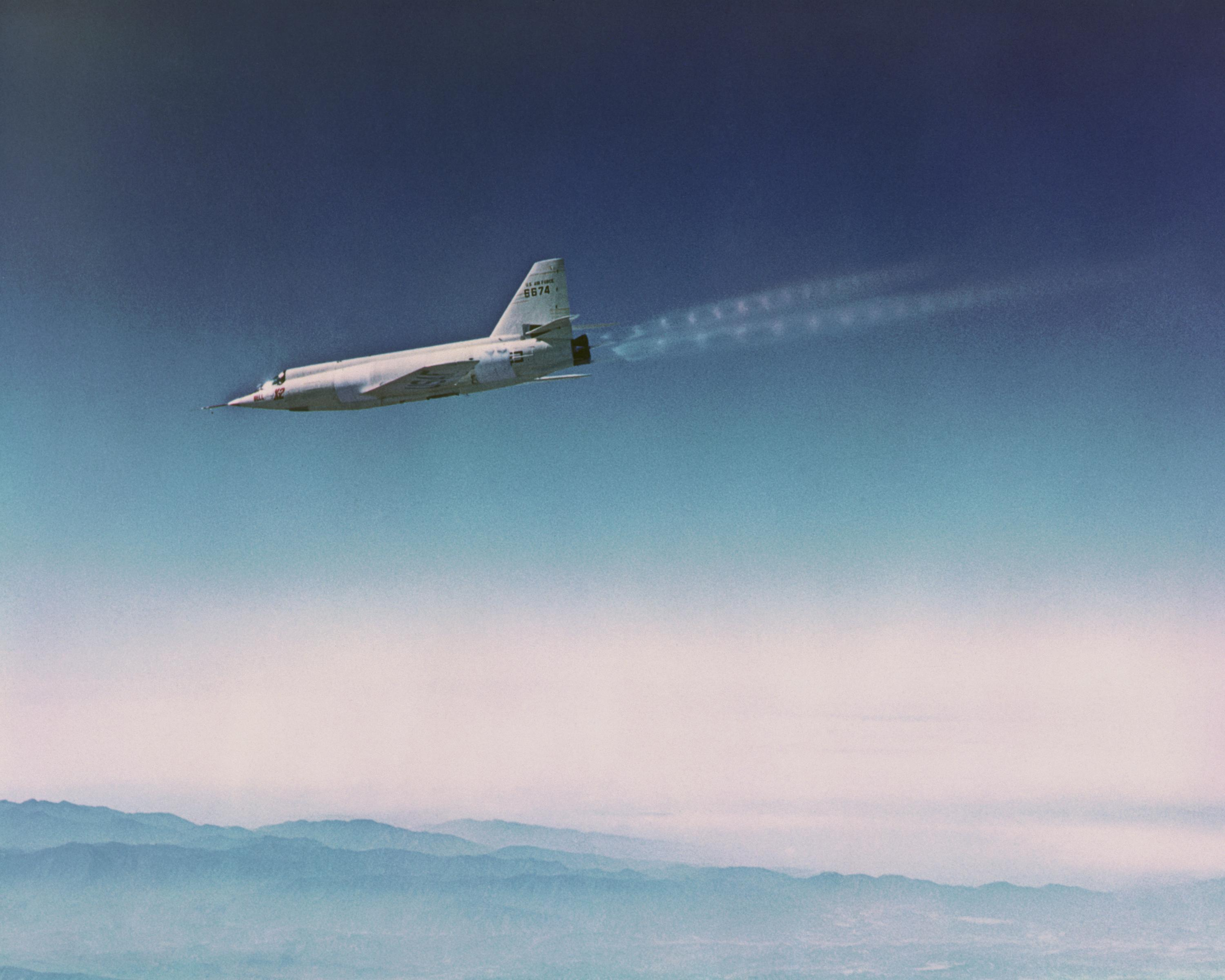
The X-2 in-flight.

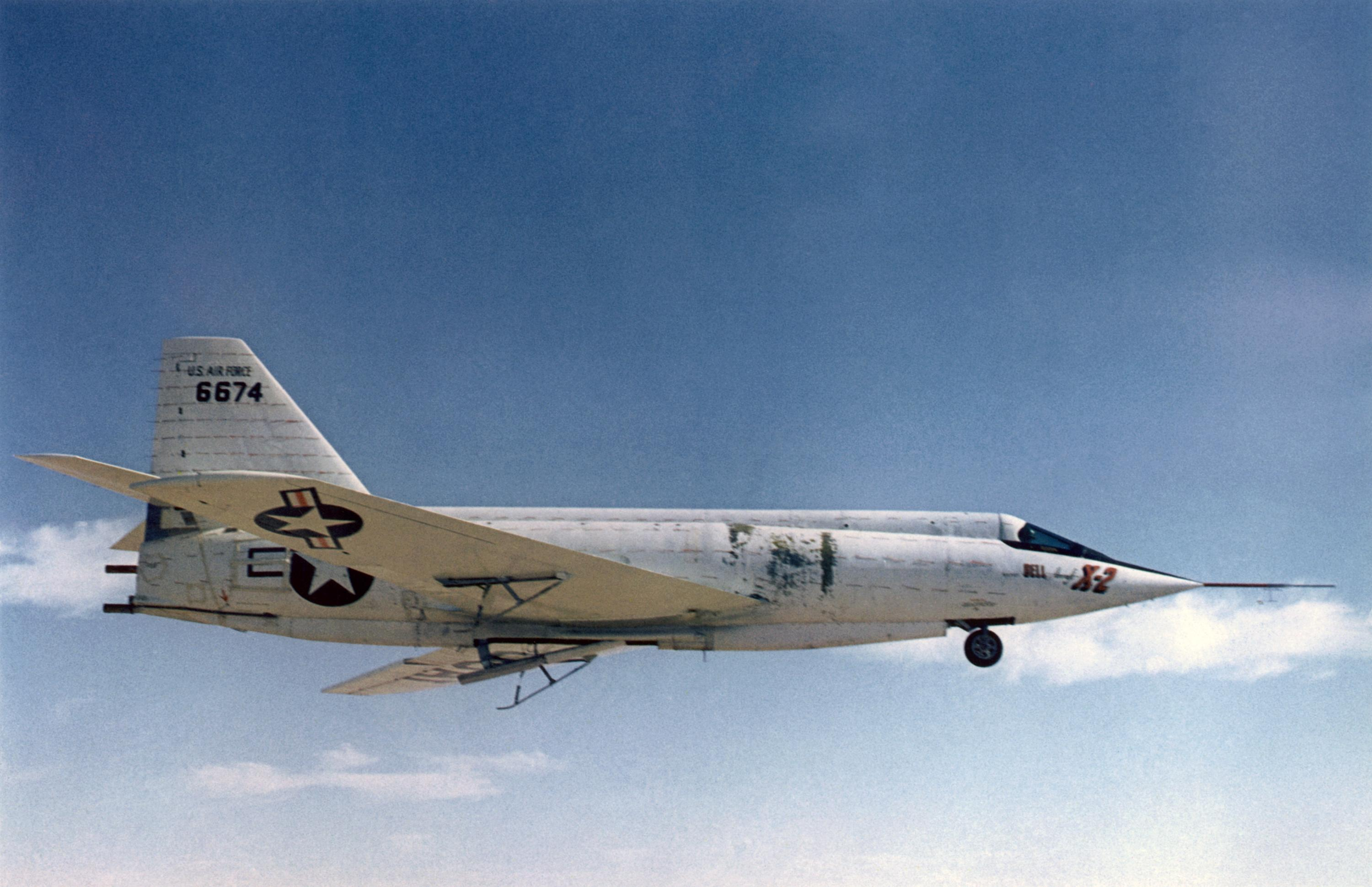
The X-2 inflight, with skids deployed for landing.

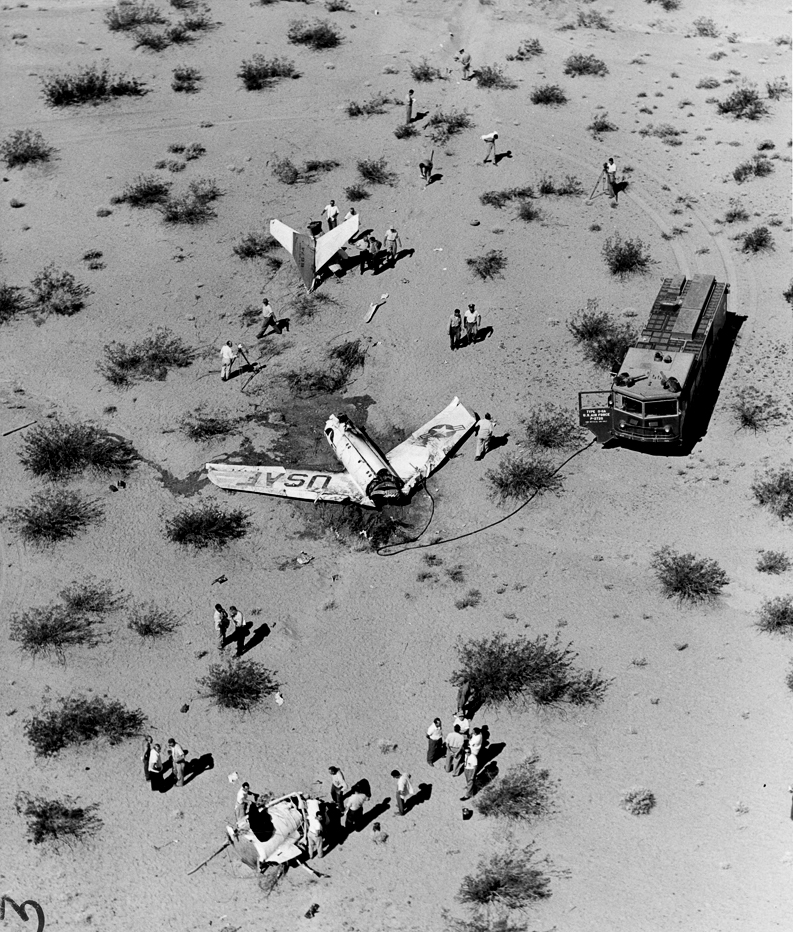
Crash site in the desert near Edwards Air Force Base.

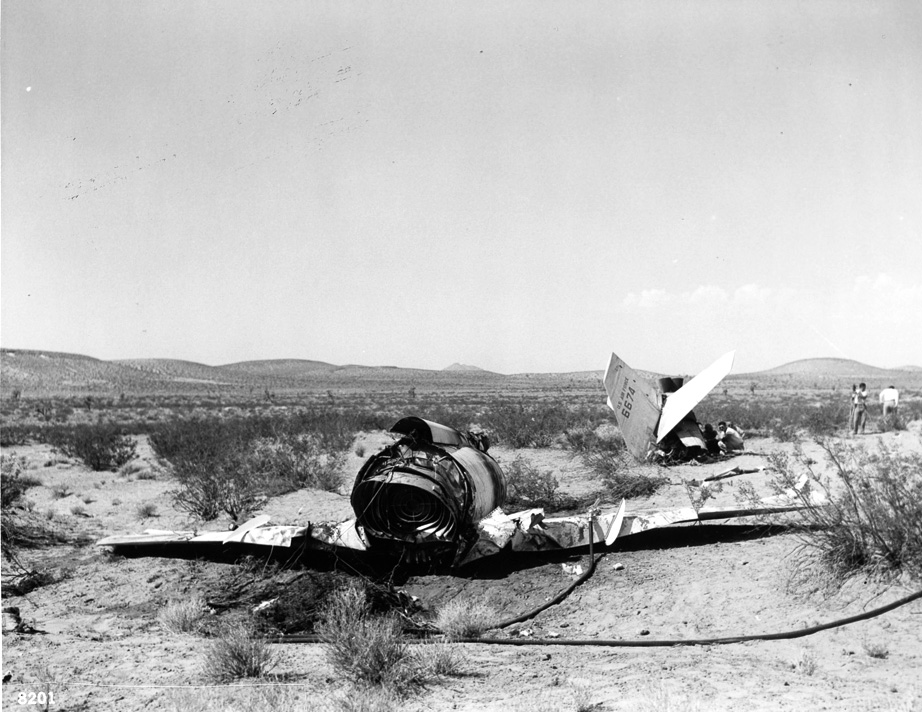
Two pieces of the X-2 at the crash site, five miles from where the escape capsule landed.

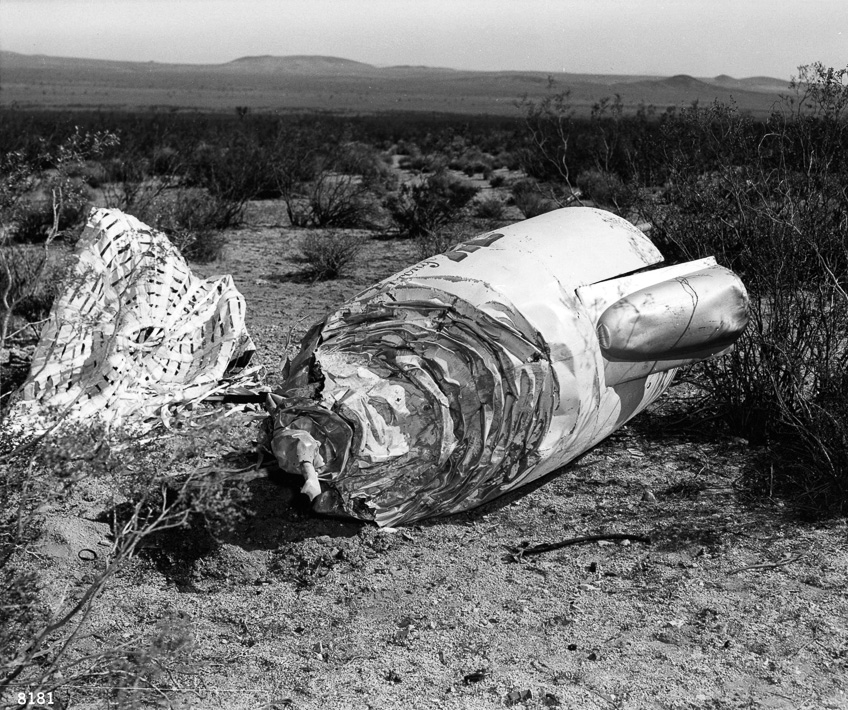
The X-2's escape capsule at the crash site.

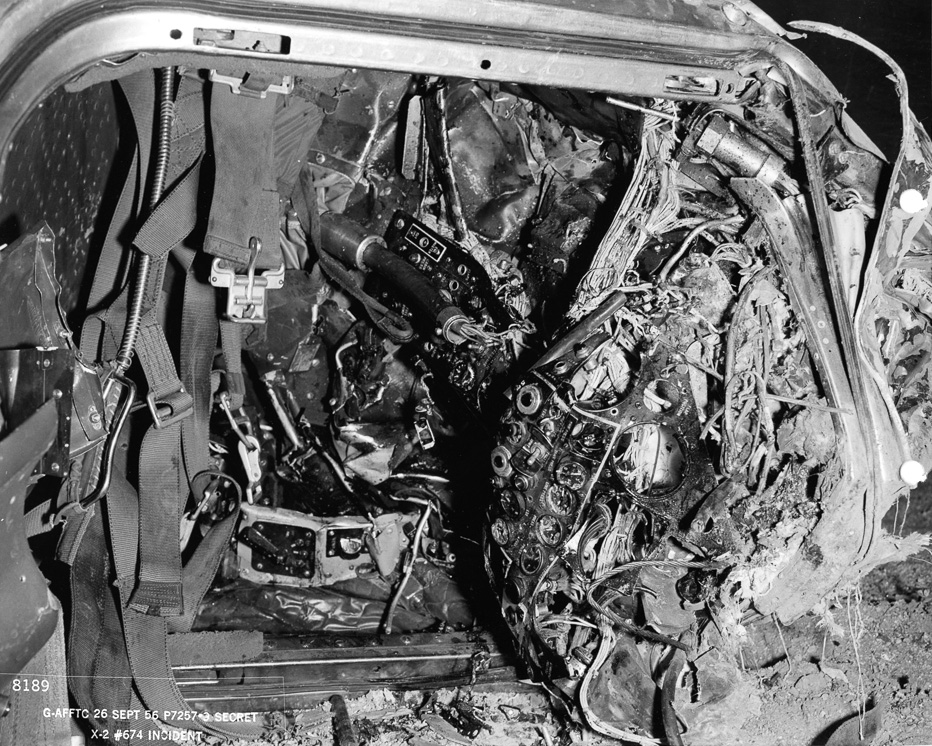
The cockpit of the X-2's escape capsule at the crash site.

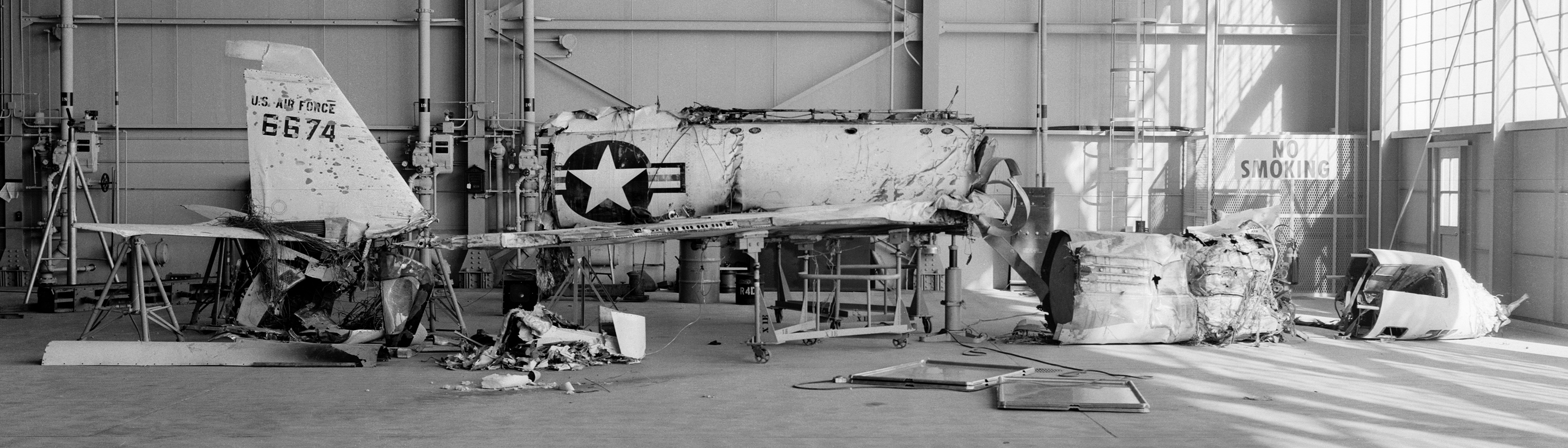
Wreckage from Apt's fatal crash in the X-2.

== Personal life ==
Apt was survived by his wife and two daughters—aged two and six. One of Apt's daughters, Sharman Apt Russell, grew up to become a writer. She wrote about the significance of his death in an essay in her book, Songs of the Fluteplayer.
