= Jean "Skip" Ziegler =

American test pilot (1920–1953)

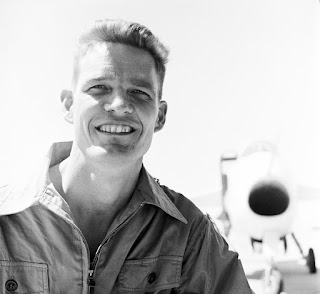
Jean 'Skip' Ziegler in front of the Bell X-5 test article at Edwards Air Force Base

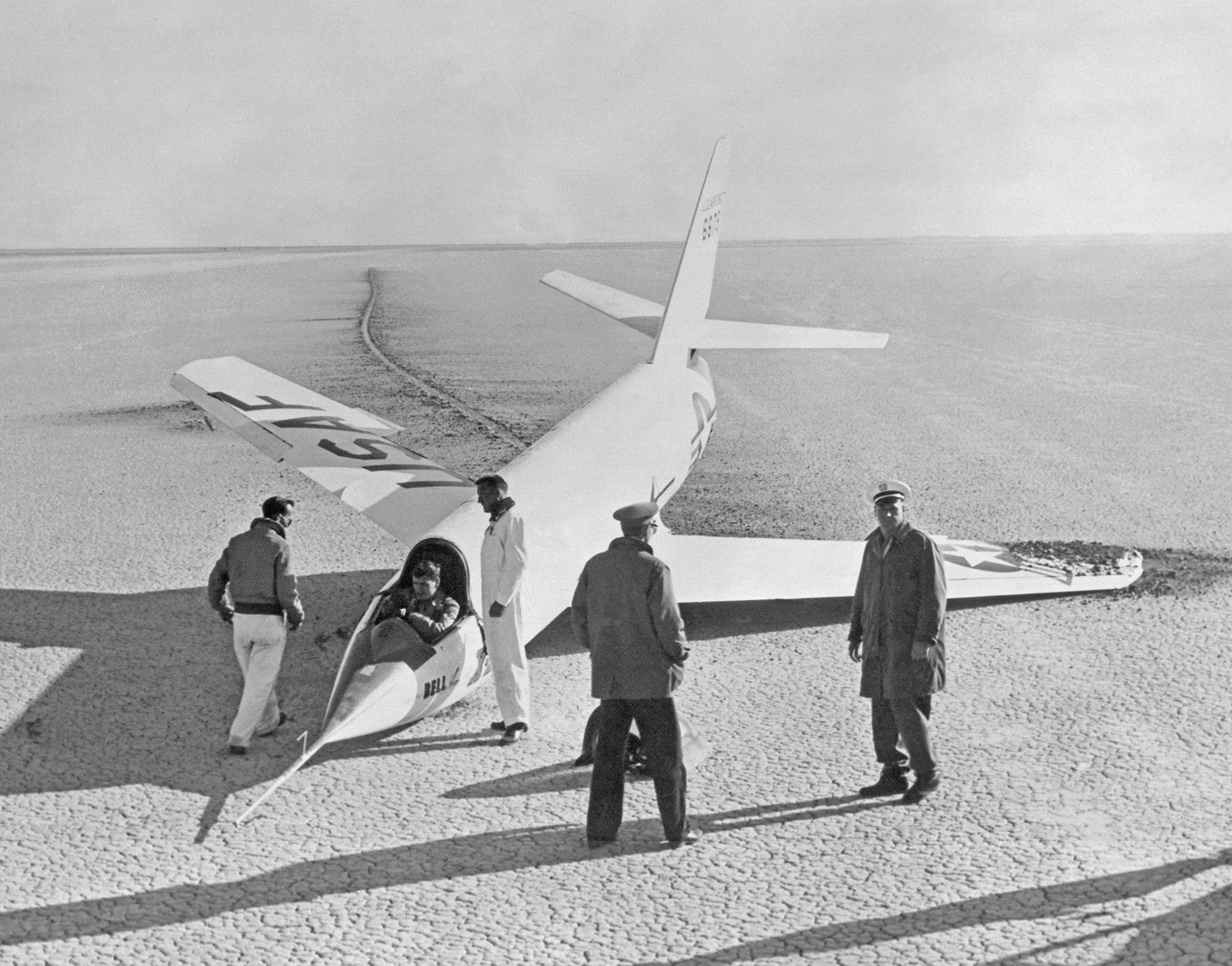
Ziegler after the first glide flight of the X-2

Jean "Skip" Ziegler (January 1, 1920 – May 12, 1953) was a United States test pilot. He was killed in an explosion of the Bell X-2 during a test flight in 1953.

== Biography ==
Born in Endeavor, Pennsylvania, on January 1, 1920, Ziegler learnt to fly on his brother's Piper Cub before enlisting in the United States Army Air Forces, flying the Douglas C-47 over the "hump".

After his discharge in 1942, he became a test pilot for Curtiss-Wright, piloting C-46s, P-40 Warhawks as well as the XP-55 Ascender, his first experience on a flying wing. After a brief interlude as a commercial and race plane pilot and Bell rocket engineer, he went on to test North American planes F-86 Sabre, B-45 Tornado, AJ-1 Savage and T-28 Trojan before being selected to work on the Bell Aircraft X-5, X-1D, X-1A and X-2.

Jean Leroy Ziegler completed the first unpowered glide flight of an X-2 at Edwards Air Force Base on 27 June 1952.

== Bell test flights ==
Date	Vehicle	Purpose
20 June 1951	X-5	First test flight of the Bell X-5.
24 July 1951	X-1D	Glide flight. Nose landing gear damaged during landing.
27 July 1951	X-5	First deployment of the swept wing mechanism.
8 October 1951	X-5	20th and final phase 1 flight before being turned over to Air Force pilot Maj. Frank Everest.
27 June 1952	X-2	First glide flight of the Bell X-2. Nose landing gear collapsed on landing.
14 February 1953	X-1A	Planned as a powered flight, issues with the propellants lead to it being completed as a glide flight with a fuel jettison test.
21 February 1953	X-1A	The first powered flight.
26 March 1953	X-1A	Successful demonstration of the four cylinder engine operation.
10 April 1953	X-1A	A planned powered flight, which was limited to mach 0.93 due to an unknown low frequency elevator buzz.
25 April 1953	X-1A	A planned powered flight, which was cut short due to the turbopump overspeeding leading Ziegler jettisoning the remaining fuel. The mach 0.93 buzz was also noted again.
12 May 1953	X-2	Captive-carry flight. An explosion caused by a structural failure in a leather gasket in the engine killed Ziegler and observer Frank Wolko.

== Death ==
On May 12, 1953, during a captive-carry flight test over Lake Ontario, X-2, serial number 46-675 suddenly exploded, killing Bell test pilot Jean Ziegler and observer Frank Wolko aboard the EB-50A mothership, which managed to land, although damaged, while the X-2 remains fell in the lake. Neither his body, nor Wolko's or the X-2 wreckage were ever retrieved.

Only after several other mysterious X-plane losses was the cause found to be a rocket engine gasket made of Ulmer leather, which decomposed and became explosively unstable after sustained exposure to liquid oxygen.

== Bibliography ==
- Peter E., Davies (2017). Bell X-2. X Planes. Oxford: Osprey Publishing. p. 42.
