= Claude Willoughby =

American baseball player (1898–1973)

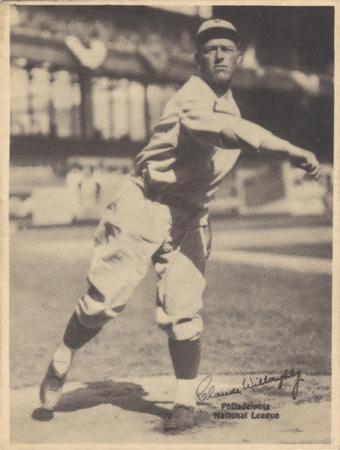
- Pitcher
- Born: November 14, 1898; Buffalo, Kansas, U.S.
- Died: August 14, 1973 (aged 74); McPherson, Kansas, U.S.
- Batted: Right Threw: Right

MLB debut
- September 18, 1925, for the Philadelphia Phillies

Last MLB appearance
- May 28, 1931, for the Pittsburgh Pirates

MLB statistics
- Win–loss record: 38–58
- Earned run average: 5.84
- Strikeouts: 175
- Stats at Baseball Reference

Teams
- Philadelphia Phillies (1925–1930); Pittsburgh Pirates (1931)

Claude William Willoughby (November 14, 1898– August 14, 1973), was an American professional baseball pitcher who played in Major League Baseball for the Philadelphia Phillies and Pittsburgh Pirates from 1925 to 1931. He was nicknamed "Weeping Willie" and "Flunky". In 219 games pitched, 101 of which were starts, Willoughby recorded a 38-58 win–loss record with a 5.84 earned run average (ERA) and 175 strikeouts in 841 1/3 innings pitched over seven seasons.

== MLB career ==
In 1929, Willoughby led the Phillies in both wins (15) and ERA (4.99). He also walked the most batters in the National League.

Willoughby pitched poorly the following season, surrendering 241 hits and 68 walks in 153 innings pitched, which resulted in a 7.59 ERA and a 4–17 win–loss record. On November 6, 1930, he was traded to the Pirates, along with shortstop Tommy Thevenow, for shortstop Dick Bartell. Willoughby pitched in just nine games for Pittsburgh, after which his major league career ended.

== Later life and death ==
After his professional baseball career, Willoughby moved back to Kansas, where he pitched for a semipro team located in Chanute in 1938-39 and managed a team in Independence in 1940-41. He worked as a pump mechanic, and moved to McPherson, Kansas in 1948, where he died on August 14, 1973.
