= Buffalo, Kansas =

City in Wilson County, Kansas

- City
- Location within Wilson County and Kansas

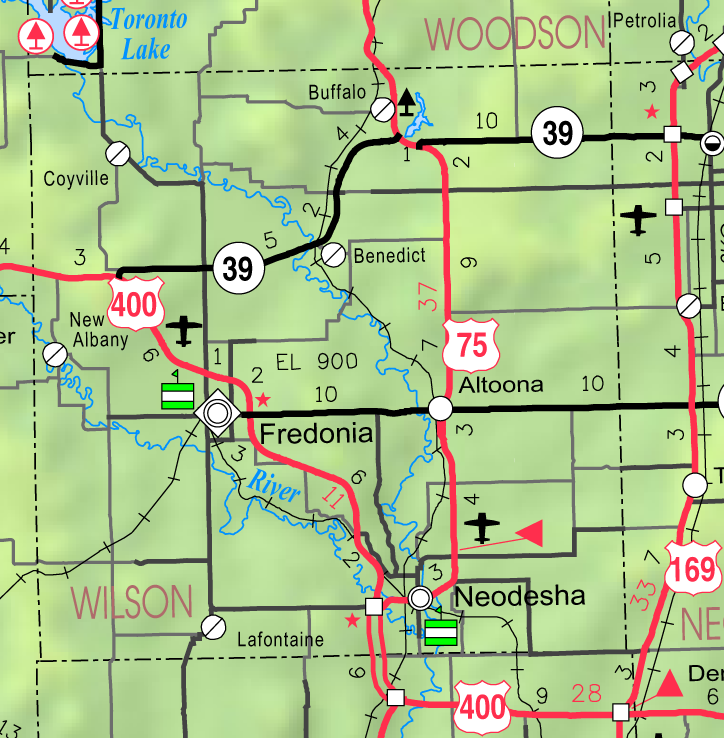
- KDOT map of Wilson County (legend)
- Coordinates: 37°42′34″N 95°41′49″W
- Country: United States
- State: Kansas
- County: Wilson
- Founded: 1867
- Incorporated: 1898
- Named for: American bison

Area
  - Total: 0.32 sq mi (0.82 km^{2})
  - Land: 0.32 sq mi (0.82 km^{2})
  - Water: 0 sq mi (0.00 km^{2})
- Elevation: 935 ft (285 m)

Population (2020)
  - Total: 217
  - Density: 690/sq mi (260/km^{2})
- Time zone: UTC-6 (CST)
  - Summer (DST): UTC-5 (CDT)
- ZIP Code: 66717
- Area code: 620
- FIPS code: 20-09150
- GNIS ID: 474927

Buffalo is a city in Wilson County, Kansas, United States. As of the 2020 census, the population of the city was 217.

== History ==
Buffalo was founded in 1867. It took its name from Buffalo Creek, which was named after the American bison, commonly known as the buffalo.

The first store in Buffalo opened in 1869 and the first hotel in 1870. Buffalo experienced growth in 1886 when the Missouri Pacific Railroad was built through it. Buffalo was incorporated as a city in 1898.

== Geography ==
Buffalo is located at 37°42′34″N 95°41′49″W (37.709569, -95.696967). According to the United States Census Bureau, the city has a total area of 0.33 square miles (0.85 km^{2}), all land.

== Demographics ==
Historical population
| Census | Pop. | Note | %± |
|---|---|---|---|
| 1900 | 299 | | — |
| 1910 | 807 | | 169.9% |
| 1920 | 739 | | −8.4% |
| 1930 | 799 | | 8.1% |
| 1940 | 555 | | −30.5% |
| 1950 | 437 | | −21.3% |
| 1960 | 422 | | −3.4% |
| 1970 | 321 | | −23.9% |
| 1980 | 386 | | 20.2% |
| 1990 | 293 | | −24.1% |
| 2000 | 284 | | −3.1% |
| 2010 | 232 | | −18.3% |
| 2020 | 217 | | −6.5% |
U.S. Decennial Census

=== 2020 census ===
The 2020 United States census counted 217 people, 93 households, and 56 families in Buffalo. The population density was 682.4 per square mile (263.5/km^{2}). There were 116 housing units at an average density of 364.8 per square mile (140.8/km^{2}). The racial makeup was 94.47% (205) white or European American (94.01% non-Hispanic white), 0.0% (0) black or African-American, 0.46% (1) Native American or Alaska Native, 0.0% (0) Asian, 0.0% (0) Pacific Islander or Native Hawaiian, 0.92% (2) from other races, and 4.15% (9) from two or more races. Hispanic or Latino of any race was 1.38% (3) of the population.

Of the 93 households, 30.1% had children under the age of 18; 34.4% were married couples living together; 28.0% had a female householder with no spouse or partner present. 29.0% of households consisted of individuals and 14.0% had someone living alone who was 65 years of age or older. The average household size was 3.1 and the average family size was 3.6. The percent of those with a bachelor's degree or higher was estimated to be 9.2% of the population.

21.2% of the population was under the age of 18, 6.9% from 18 to 24, 22.1% from 25 to 44, 29.5% from 45 to 64, and 20.3% who were 65 years of age or older. The median age was 44.5 years. For every 100 females, there were 108.7 males. For every 100 females ages 18 and older, there were 108.5 males.

The 2016–2020 5-year American Community Survey estimates show that the median household income was $44,500 (with a margin of error of +/- $25,481) and the median family income was $65,096 (+/- $27,983). Males had a median income of $29,875 (+/- $4,087) versus $25,250 (+/- $16,159) for females. The median income for those above 16 years old was $29,313 (+/- $3,139). Approximately, 9.0% of families and 14.2% of the population were below the poverty line, including 19.4% of those under the age of 18 and 11.9% of those ages 65 or over.

=== 2010 census ===
As of the census of 2010, there were 232 people, 95 households, and 70 families residing in the city. The population density was 703.0 inhabitants per square mile (271.4/km^{2}). There were 123 housing units at an average density of 372.7 per square mile (143.9/km^{2}). The racial makeup of the city was 97.8% White, 0.9% Native American, and 1.3% from two or more races. Hispanic or Latino of any race were 0.9% of the population.

There were 95 households, of which 35.8% had children under the age of 18 living with them, 56.8% were married couples living together, 11.6% had a female householder with no husband present, 5.3% had a male householder with no wife present, and 26.3% were non-families. 23.2% of all households were made up of individuals, and 7.4% had someone living alone who was 65 years of age or older. The average household size was 2.44 and the average family size was 2.79.

The median age in the city was 40 years. 26.7% of residents were under the age of 18; 6.5% were between the ages of 18 and 24; 24.1% were from 25 to 44; 28.4% were from 45 to 64; and 14.2% were 65 years of age or older. The gender makeup of the city was 50.4% male and 49.6% female.

=== 2000 census ===
As of the census of 2000, there were 284 people, 107 households, and 78 families residing in the city. The population density was 820.7 inhabitants per square mile (316.9/km^{2}). There were 133 housing units at an average density of 384.3 per square mile (148.4/km^{2}). The racial makeup of the city was 96.83% White, 0.35% African American, 1.76% Native American, and 1.06% from two or more races. Hispanic or Latino of any race were 0.70% of the population.

There were 107 households, out of which 35.5% had children under the age of 18 living with them, 59.8% were married couples living together, 8.4% had a female householder with no husband present, and 27.1% were non-families. 25.2% of all households were made up of individuals, and 14.0% had someone living alone who was 65 years of age or older. The average household size was 2.65 and the average family size was 3.09.

In the city, the population was spread out, with 31.3% under the age of 18, 6.3% from 18 to 24, 26.8% from 25 to 44, 22.5% from 45 to 64, and 13.0% who were 65 years of age or older. The median age was 34 years. For every 100 females, there were 83.2 males. For every 100 females age 18 and over, there were 85.7 males.

The median income for a household in the city was $34,688, and the median income for a family was $38,750. Males had a median income of $26,750 versus $15,938 for females. The per capita income for the city was $13,529. About 6.7% of families and 7.0% of the population were below the poverty line, including 12.3% of those under the age of eighteen and 5.7% of those 65 or over.

== Government ==
City Hall is located at 212 West Buffalo Street.

== Education ==
The community is served by Altoona-Midway USD 387 public school district. The Altoona-Midway High School mascot is Jets.

Buffalo High School closed in 1958 through school unification. The Buffalo High School mascot was Pirates.

== Notable people ==
- Milburn Apt (1924–1956), U.S. Air Force test pilot, first man to attain speeds faster than Mach 3
- Claude Willoughby (1898–1973), professional baseball pitcher from 1925-1931. He played for the Philadelphia Phillies and Pittsburgh Pirates.

== See also ==
- 38th parallel structures
