= Bell X-2 =

Experimental research aircraft

X-2
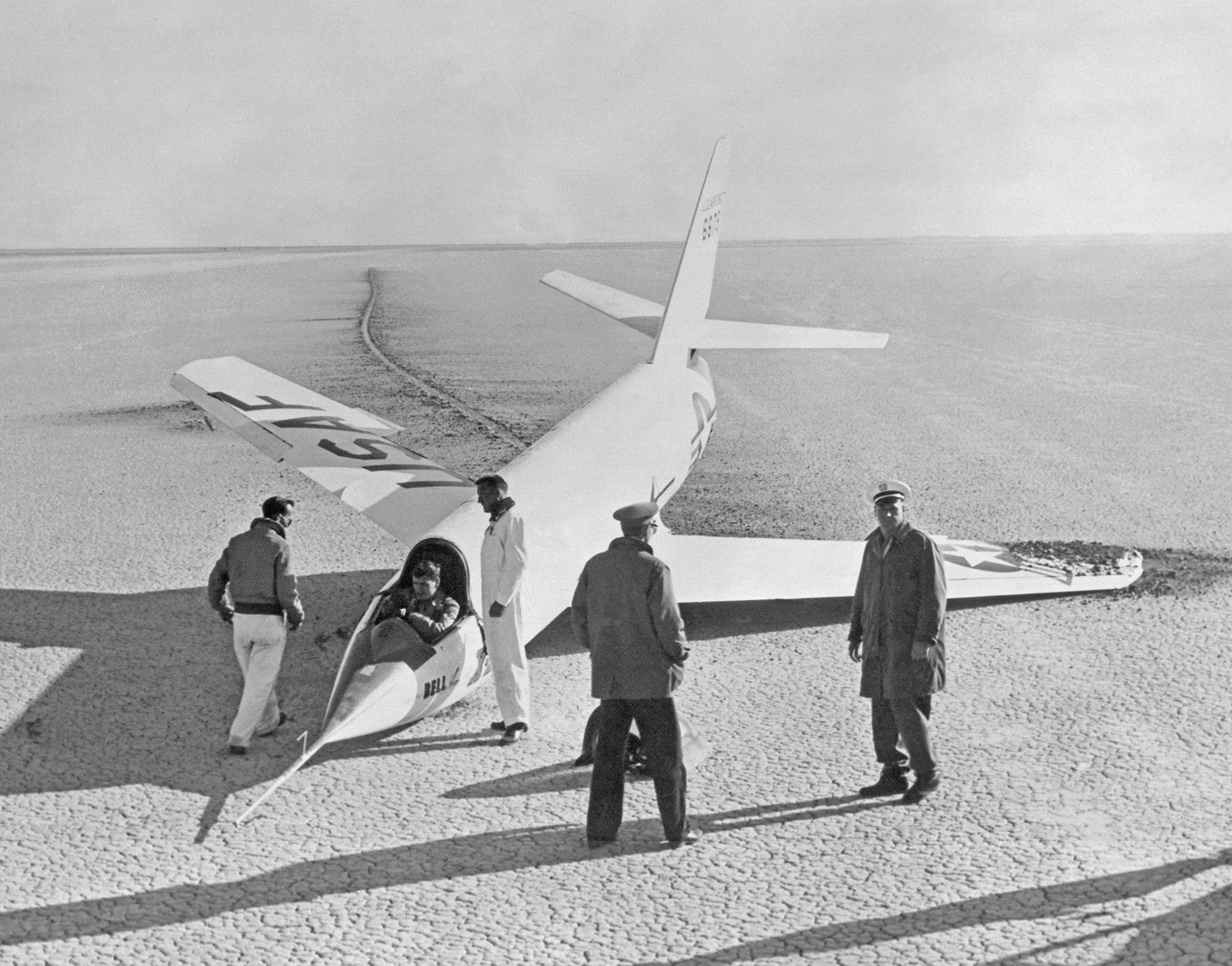
- Bell X-2 #2 with a collapsed nose landing gear, after landing on the first glide flight, on 27 June 1952 at Edwards Air Force Base.

General information
- Type: Research aircraft
- National origin: United States
- Manufacturer: Bell Aircraft
- Status: Destroyed
- Primary users: United States Air Force National Advisory Committee for Aeronautics
- Number built: 2

History
- First flight: 27 June 1952 (first drop glide); 18 November 1955 (first powered flight)
- Retired: 27 September 1956

The Bell X-2 (nicknamed "Starbuster") was an X-plane research aircraft built to investigate flight characteristics in the Mach 2–3 range. The X-2 was a rocket-powered, swept-wing research aircraft developed jointly in 1945 by Bell Aircraft Corporation, the United States Army Air Forces and the National Advisory Committee for Aeronautics (NACA) to explore aerodynamic problems of supersonic flight and to expand the speed and altitude regimes obtained with the earlier X-1 series of research aircraft.

== Design and development ==
The Bell X-2 was developed to provide a vehicle for researching flight characteristics at speeds and altitudes in excess of the capabilities of the Bell X-1 and D-558 II, while investigating aerodynamic heating problems in what was then called the "thermal thicket".

The Bell X-2 had a prolonged development period due to the advances needed in aerodynamic design, control systems, materials that retained adequate mechanical properties at high temperature, and other technologies that had to be developed. Not only did the X-2 push the envelope of manned flight to speeds, altitudes and temperatures beyond any other aircraft at the time, it pioneered throttleable rocket engines in U.S. aircraft (previously demonstrated on the Messerschmitt Me 163B during World War II) and digital flight simulation. The XLR25 rocket engine, built by Curtiss-Wright, was based on the smooth variable-thrust JATO engine built by Robert Goddard in 1942 for the Navy.

Providing adequate stability and control for aircraft flying at high supersonic speeds was only one of the major difficulties facing flight researchers as they approached Mach 3. For, at speeds in that region, they knew they would also begin to encounter a "thermal barrier", severe heating effects caused by aerodynamic friction. Constructed of stainless steel and a copper-nickel alloy called K-Monel, and powered by a liquid propellant (alcohol and oxygen) two-chamber Curtiss-Wright XLR25 2,500 to 15,000 lbf (11 to 67 kN) sea level thrust, continuously throttleable rocket engines, the swept-wing Bell X-2 was designed to probe the supersonic region.

== Operational history ==
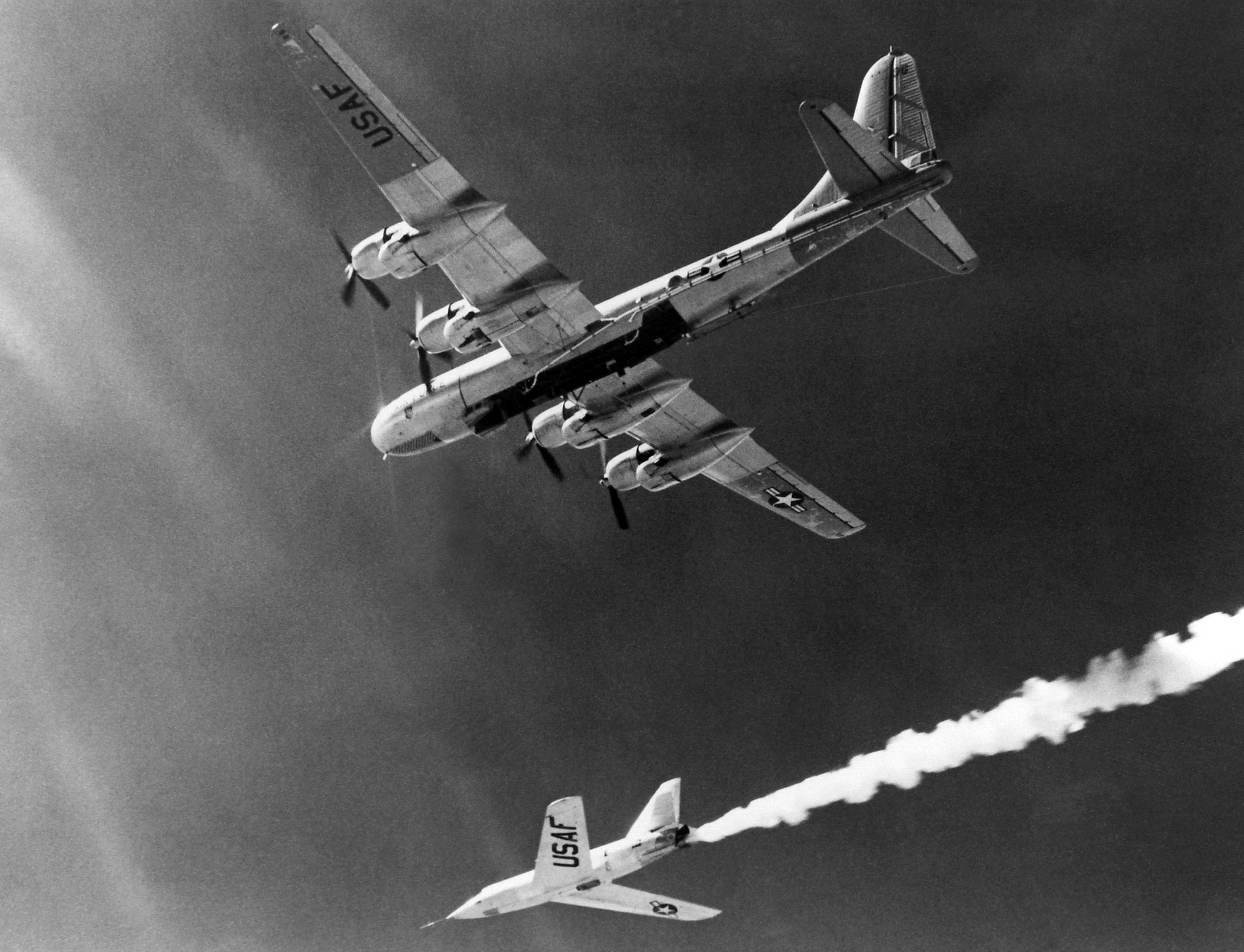
X-2 just after being dropped.

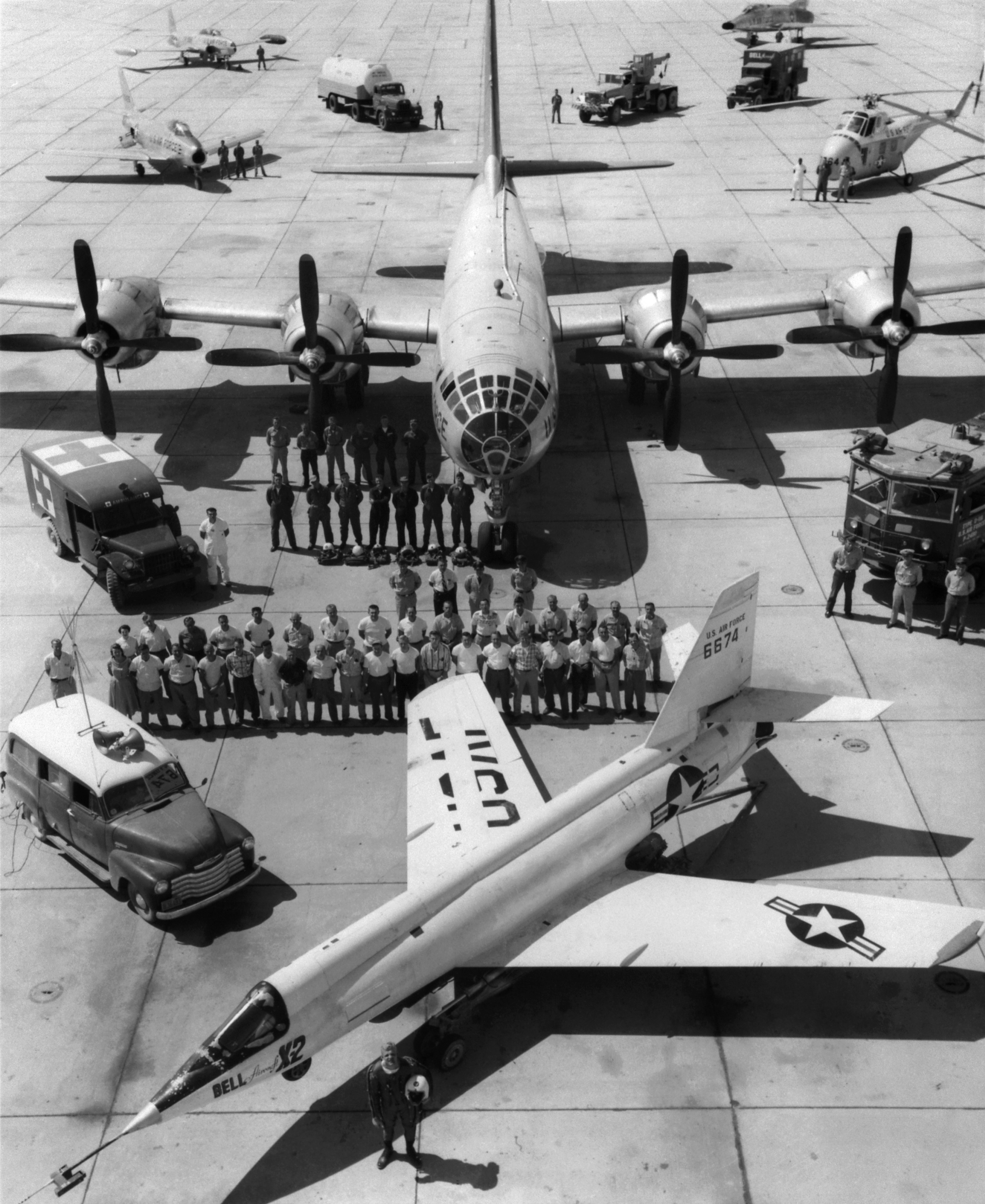
X-2, crew, B-50 mothership, and support equipment.

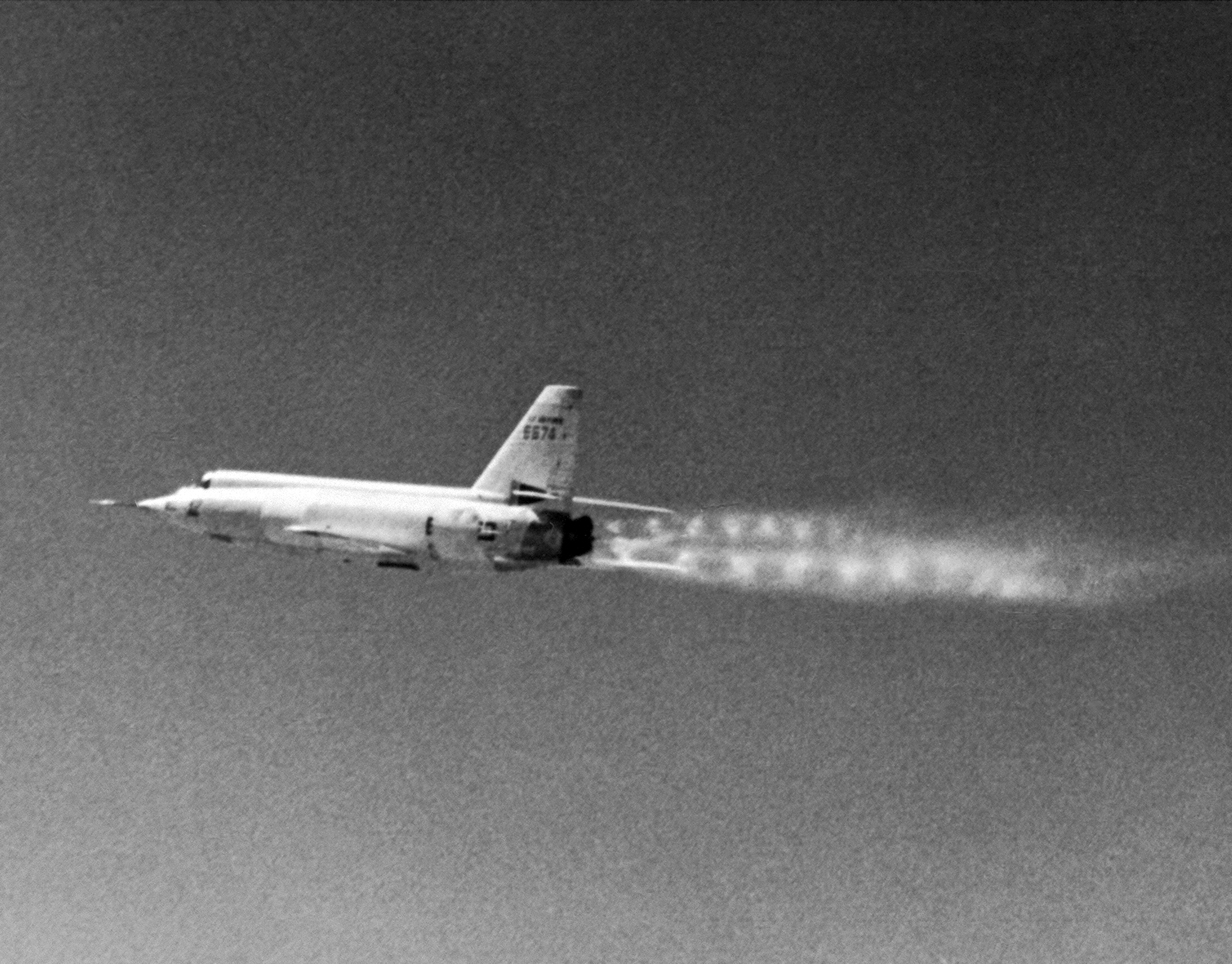
The X-2's twin set of shock diamonds in the exhaust plume, characteristic of supersonic conditions from a two-chamber rocket engine.

Following a drop launch from a modified B-50 bomber, Bell test pilot Jean "Skip" Ziegler completed the first unpowered glide flight of an X-2 at Edwards Air Force Base on 27 June 1952. Ziegler and aircraft #2 (46-675) were subsequently lost on 12 May 1953, in an inflight explosion during a captive flight intended to check the aircraft's liquid oxygen system. A B-50 crew member, Frank Wolko, was also killed during the incident. The wreckage of the aircraft fell into Lake Ontario and was not recovered.

Lt. Col. Frank K. "Pete" Everest completed the first powered flight in the #1 airplane (46-674) on 18 November 1955. By the time of his ninth and final flight in late July 1956 the project was years behind schedule, but he had established a new speed record of Mach 2.87 (1,900 mph, 3,050 km/h). About this time, the YF-104A was demonstrating speeds of Mach 2.2 or 2.3 in a fighter configuration. The X-2 was living up to its promise, but not without difficulties. At high speeds, Everest reported its flight controls were only marginally effective. High speed center of pressure shifts along with fin aeroelasticity were major factors. Moreover, simulation and wind tunnel studies, combined with data from his flights, suggested the airplane would encounter very severe stability problems as it approached Mach 3.

Captains Iven C. Kincheloe and Milburn G. "Mel" Apt were assigned the job of "envelope expansion" and, on 7 September 1956, Kincheloe became the first pilot ever to climb above 100,000 ft (30,500 m) as he flew the X-2 to a peak altitude of 126,200 ft (38,470 m). Just 20 days later, on the morning of 27 September, Apt was launched from the B-50 for his first flight in a rocket airplane. He had been instructed to follow the "optimum maximum energy flight path". With nozzle extenders and a longer than normal motor run, Apt flew an extraordinarily precise profile; he became the first man to exceed Mach 3, reaching Mach 3.2 (2,094 mph, 3,370 km/h) at 65,500 ft (19,960 m).

The flight had been flawless to this point, but shortly after attaining top speed, Apt attempted a banking turn while the aircraft was still above Mach 3 (lagging instrumentation may have indicated he was flying at a slower speed or perhaps he feared he was straying too far from the safety of his landing site on Rogers Dry Lake). The X-2 tumbled violently out of control and he found himself struggling with three sequential coupling modes, control coupling, inertial roll coupling and supersonic spinning. "Inertia coupling" and a subsonic inverted spin had overtaken Chuck Yeager in the X-1A nearly three years before. Yeager, although exposed to much higher vehicle inertial forces, was able to recover. Apt attempted to recover from a spin, but could not. The rudder lock was still on in the attempted spin recovery. He fired the ejection capsule, which was itself only equipped with a relatively small drogue parachute. Apt was probably disabled by the severe release forces. As the capsule fell for several minutes to the desert floor, he did not exit so that he could use his personal parachute before ground impact, and was killed. The aircraft continued to fly in a series of glides and stalls before landing and breaking into three pieces (separate from the capsule). A proposal to salvage the aircraft and modify it for a hypersonic test program was not approved. The aircraft was scrapped.

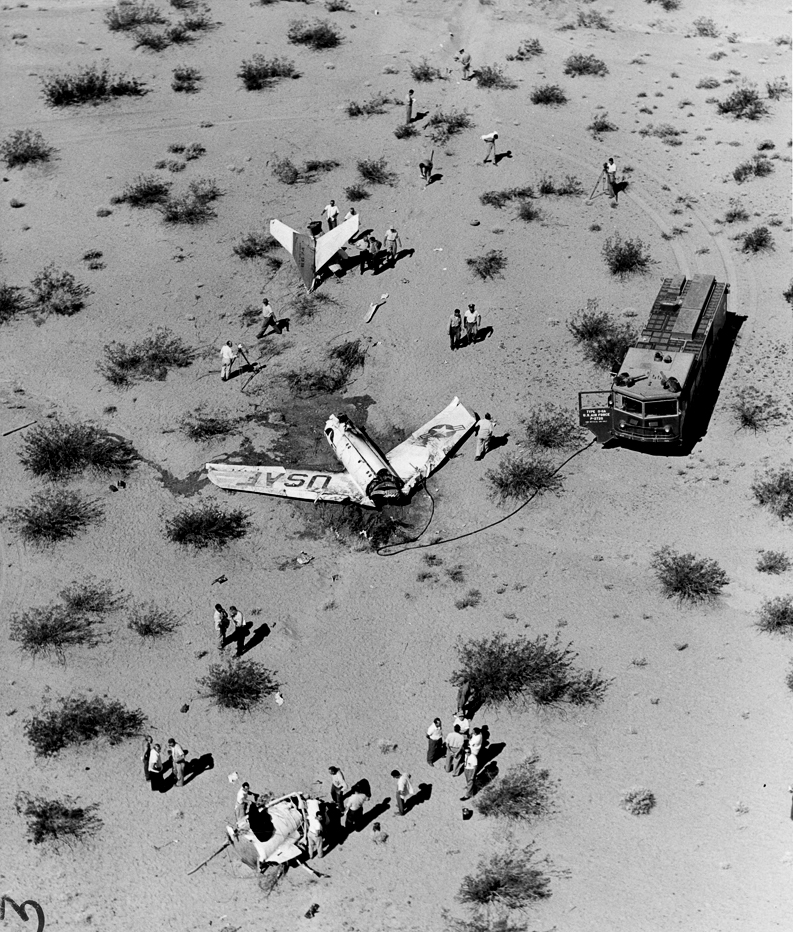
Crash site in the desert near Edwards Air Force Base.

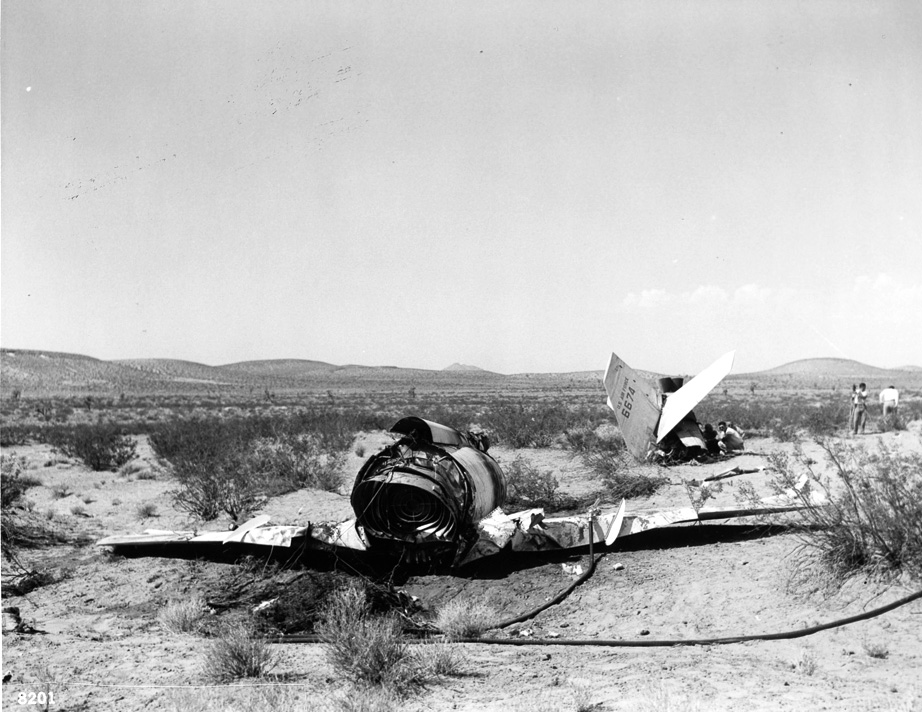
Two pieces of the X-2 at the crash site, 5 miles (8.0 km) from where the escape capsule landed.

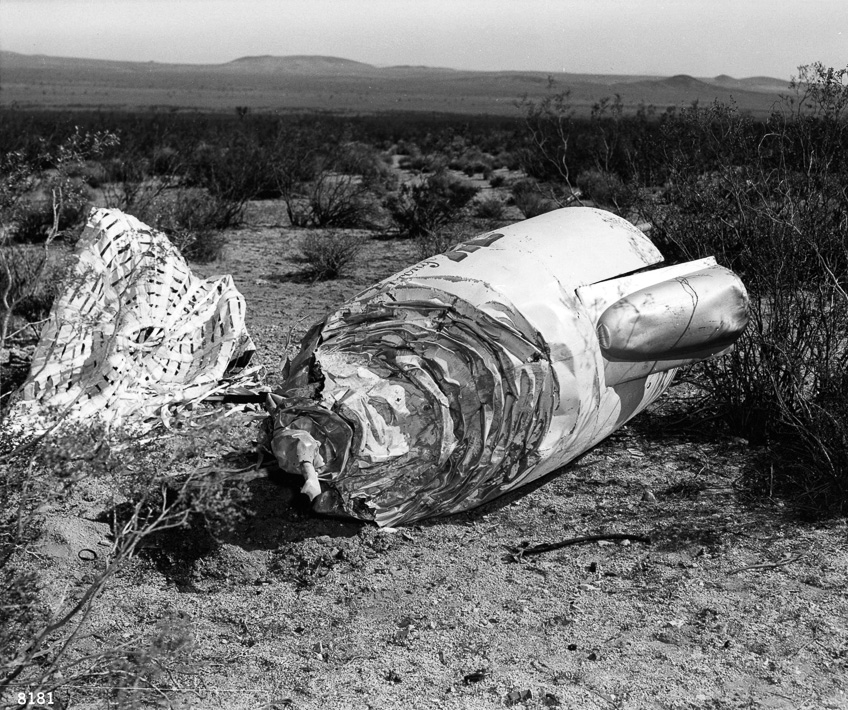
The X-2's escape capsule at the crash site.

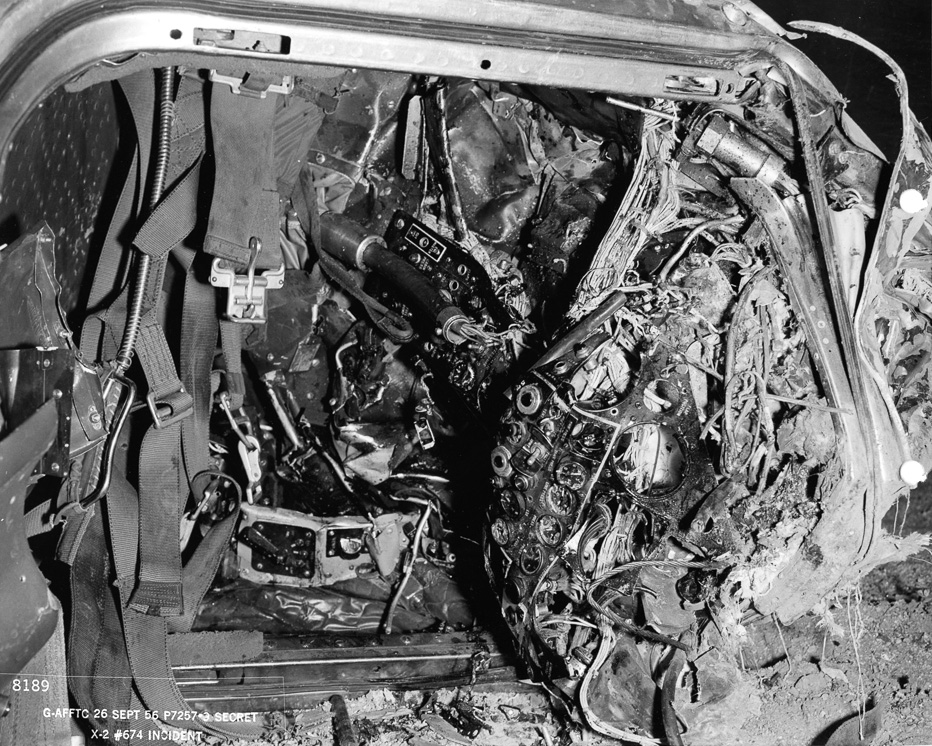
The cockpit of the X-2's escape capsule at the crash site.

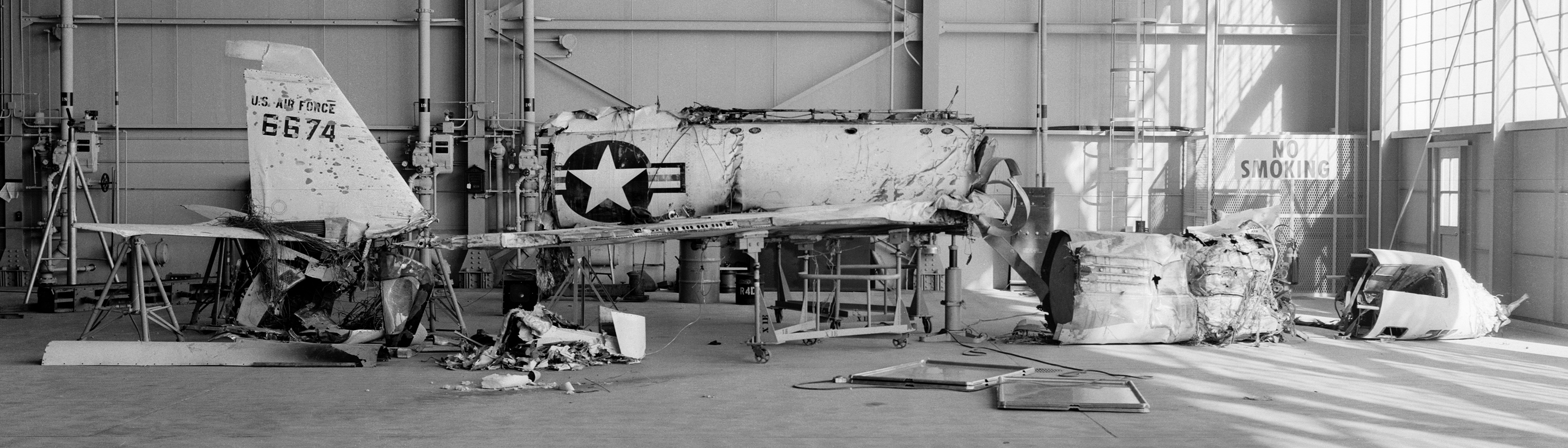
Wreckage from Apt's fatal crash in the X-2.

The subsequent investigation into the X-2's fatal flight raised numerous contributing factors into the crash—largely focusing on Apt's decision to turn the aircraft while still above Mach 3. Some cited his lack of experience with rocket planes, but, as historian Chris Petty notes, "he had in fact flown the complex profile almost perfectly, but this, combined with additional seconds of thrust from the XLR25 [engine], had carried the X-2 well beyond the envelope of knowledge and into the uncertain stability predicted by the GEDA [Goodyear Electronic Differential Analyzer computer]." In short, Petty suggests that Apt did his job too well and may have been pushed to exceed Mach 3 by the AFFTC and conflicting priorities within it. Petty quotes Base commander General Stanley Holtoner: "I think that every supervisory guy from me on down has criticized himself, because if we had told this boy [Apt] to stop at a specific speed, this wouldn't have happened."

One point that became clear even before the investigation was that the X-2's escape mechanism was woefully inadequate. According to The New York Times reporting on the event, Everest had criticized the relatively new detachable capsule, maintaining that "some safety had been sacrificed in preference to delaying the X-2 flight tests while the escape mechanism was modified." Another NACA research pilot, Scott Crossfield, described it more bluntly as a "way to commit suicide to keep from getting killed."

While the X-2 had delivered valuable research data on high-speed aerodynamic heat build-up and extreme high-altitude flight conditions (although it is unclear how much, as the unmanned Lockheed X-7 and IM-99 were among the winged vehicles operating at comparable or higher velocities in this era), this tragic event terminated the program before the National Advisory Committee for Aeronautics could commence detailed flight research with the aircraft. The search for answers to many of the riddles of high-Mach flight had to be postponed until the arrival three years later of the most advanced of all the experimental rocket aircraft, the North American X-15.

=== Flight test program ===
Two aircraft completed a total of 20 flights (27 June 1952 – 27 September 1956).

- 46-674: seven glide flights, 10 powered flights, crashed 27 September 1956, subsequently scrapped
- 46-675: three glide flights, no powered flights, destroyed 12 May 1953

See List_of_X-2_flights for details.

== Specifications (X-2) ==

Data from Concept Aircraft: Prototypes, X-Planes and Experimental Aircraft

General characteristics

- Crew: 1
- Length: 37 ft 10 in (11.53 m)
- Wingspan: 32 ft 3 in (9.83 m)
- Height: 11 ft 10 in (3.61 m)
- Wing area: 260 sq ft (24 m^{2})
- Airfoil: NACA 2S-(50) (05-50) (05-arc)
- Empty weight: 12,375 lb (5,613 kg)
- Max takeoff weight: 24,910 lb (11,299 kg)
- Powerplant: 1 × Curtiss-Wright XLR25 liquid-fuelled rocket engine, 15,000 lbf (67 kN) thrust at sea level

Performance

- Maximum speed: 2,094 mph (3,370 km/h, 1,820 kn)
- Maximum speed: Mach 3.196
- Service ceiling: 126,200 ft (38,500 m)

== See also ==
- Mach number

Aircraft of comparable role, configuration, and era

- Douglas D-558-2 Skyrocket

Related lists

- List of experimental aircraft
- List of rocket aircraft
- List of X-2 flights, with list of pilots
