= Frank Kendall Everest Jr. =

United States Air Force general

Frank K. Everest Jr.
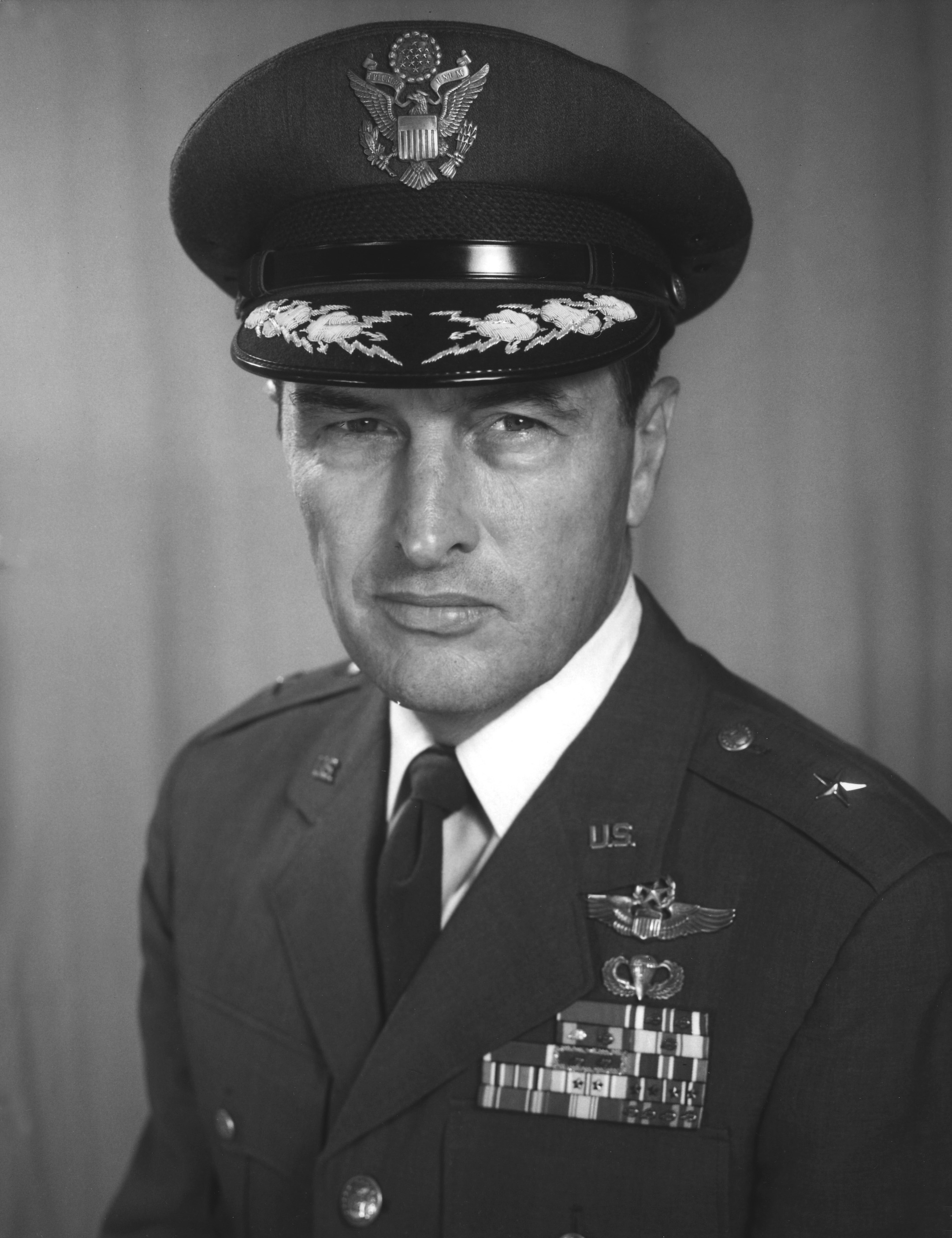
- U.S. Air Force Photo
- Born: Frank Kendall Everest Jr. August 9, 1920; Fairmont, West Virginia, U.S.
- Died: October 1, 2004 (aged 84)
- Military career
- Allegiance: United States of America
- Branch: United States Army Air Forces; United States Air Force
- Service years: 1941–1973
- Rank: Brigadier general
- Nickname: Pete
- Commands: 4453d Combat Crew Training Wing; Air Rescue Service
- Conflicts: World War II; Vietnam War
- Awards: Air Force Distinguished Service Medal; Legion of Merit (3); Distinguished Flying Cross (3); Purple Heart; Air Medal (8)

Brigadier General Frank Kendall "Pete" Everest Jr. (August 9, 1920 – October 1, 2004) was a U.S. Air Force officer who is best remembered as an aeroengineer and test pilot during the 1950s.

== Early years ==
Everest was born August 9, 1920, in Fairmont, West Virginia. After he graduated from Fairmont Senior High School in 1938, he attended Fairmont State College for one year. He later studied Engineering at West Virginia University to prepare himself for a flying career. He graduated from the Armed Forces Staff College, Norfolk, Virginia, in 1956.

== Military career ==
He entered United States Army Air Forces aviation cadet pilot training on November 11, 1941, graduated and received a commission on July 3, 1942. Among his classmates in Class 42-F was future ETO ace Robert S. Johnson. After Curtiss P-40 aircraft training, he was sent to North Africa and flew 94 combat missions in Africa, Sicily and Italy with the 314th Fighter Squadron, 324th Fighter Group. During that tour of duty, he shot down two German Ju 52 transports on April 18, 1943, and damaged another.

In May 1944 he was assigned to a fighter squadron at Venice, Florida, as an instructor. He asked for combat duty again and was assigned to the China-Burma-India Theater of Operations. There he was assigned to command the 17th Provisional Fighter Squadron, 5th Provisional Fighter Group of the Chinese American Composite Wing at Zhenjiang, China. This wing consisted of both USAAF and Republic of China pilots flying in mixed elements. He completed 67 combat missions before his plane was shot down by ground fire in May 1945. He was captured and tortured as a Japanese prisoner of war before being repatriated at the end of hostilities.

Following a rest leave, he was assigned in February 1946 to the Flight Test Division at Wright-Patterson Air Force Base in Ohio as a test pilot. Graduating from Air Materiel Command Flight Performance School with the Class 46D, he took part in many experimental tests of the Bell X-1 and established an unofficial airplane altitude record of 71,902 feet.

In September 1951 he was transferred to the Air Force Flight Test Center at Edwards Air Force Base, California, and became the chief Air Force test pilot as head of the Flight Test Operations Division. During his stay at Edwards, Everest tested the X-1, 2, 3, 4 and 5; XF-92 and YB-52. He also took part in test programs for the F-88, 100, 101, 102, 104 and 105; the B-52, B-57 and 66 aircraft. On October 29, 1953, he established a world speed record of 755.149 mph in a F-100A.

Everest test-flew the Bell X-1B to a speed of Mach 2.3 (2.3 times the speed of sound) in December 1954, making him the second fastest man in the world, Later flights in the Bell X-2 rocket plane established him as "the fastest man alive" when he attained a new unofficial speed record of 1,957 mph or Mach 2.9.

He was transferred to Hahn Air Base, Germany, in March 1957, as commander of the 461st Fighter Squadron of the 36th Fighter Wing. He was assigned to North Africa in July 1958 as a group commander and later became deputy for operations at Wheelus Air Base, Libya. He became director of operations, 401st Tactical Fighter Wing, England Air Force Base, Louisiana, in January 1961, upon returning to the United States.

Everest next commanded the 4453d Combat Crew Training Wing at MacDill Air Force Base, Florida, and in June 1964 he transferred with the wing to Davis-Monthan Air Force Base, Arizona In May 1965 he was transferred to Nellis Air Force Base, Nevada, to become commander of the 4520th Combat Crew Training Wing.

In June 1966 Everest became director of aerospace safety in the Office of the Deputy Inspector for Inspection and Safety, Norton Air Force Base, California. He was transferred to the Pentagon in January 1969 as assistant director (Operational Test and Evaluation), Office of the Director of Defense Research and Engineering.

During the period January 1966 to September 1972, he regularly deployed to Southeast Asia where he flew 32 total combat missions in F-4 Phantom, A-1 Skyraider, F-100 Super Sabre, C-130 Hercules, C-141 Starlifter, and HC-130 Hercules aircraft.

Everest assumed command of Aerospace Rescue and Recovery Service, of the Military Airlift Command, at Scott Air Force Base, Illinois, in April 1970.

He was promoted to the temporary grade of brigadier general effective November 1, 1965, with date of rank October 29, 1965. He retired from the Air Force on March 1, 1973.

General Everest's service-wide nickname was "Pete".

== Honors ==
His military decorations and awards include the Air Force Distinguished Service Medal, Legion of Merit with two oak leaf clusters, Distinguished Flying Cross with two oak leaf clusters, Air Medal with seven oak leaf clusters, Air Force Commendation Medal with oak leaf cluster, Purple Heart, Distinguished Unit Citation Emblem with two oak leaf clusters, Air Force Outstanding Unit Award Ribbon, and the Chinese Aviation Award.

U.S. Air Force Command Pilot Badge
U.S. Air Force Parachutist Badge
Air Force Distinguished Service Medal
| Legion of Merit with two bronze oak leaf clusters | Distinguished Flying Cross with two bronze oak leaf clusters | Purple Heart |
| Air Medal with one silver and two bronze oak leaf clusters | Air Force Commendation Medal with bronze oak leaf cluster | Air Force Presidential Unit Citation with two bronze oak leaf clusters |
| Air Force Outstanding Unit Award | Prisoner of War Medal | American Campaign Medal |
| Asiatic-Pacific Campaign Medal with two bronze campaign stars | European-African-Middle Eastern Campaign Medal with four bronze campaign stars | World War II Victory Medal |
| National Defense Service Medal with bronze service star | Armed Forces Expeditionary Medal | Vietnam Service Medal |
| Air Force Longevity Service Award with one silver and two bronze oak leaf clusters | Small Arms Expert Marksmanship Ribbon | Vietnam Campaign Medal |

He is a command pilot with more than 9,000 flying hours and a graduate of the U.S. Army Parachutists School at Fort Benning, Georgia.

In addition to these and other military honors, General Everest has been recognized repeatedly for his contributions to aerospace progress. He was chosen as one of 1955s "Ten Outstanding Young Men" by the U.S. Junior Chamber of Commerce. In 1956 the U.S. Chamber of Commerce named him one of the nation's "Greatest Living Americans." A year later he was awarded both the Harmon Trophy and the Octave Chanute Award.

In 1988, he won the Godfrey L. Cabot Award. He was inducted into the Aerospace Walk of Honor in 1991. In 2009, Everest received the USAF Test Pilot School's Distinguished Alumnus Award from Class 08B. This award is presented bi-annually to a USAF TPS graduate who has made significant and lasting contributions to aviation science and the flight test community. In 1989, Gen Everest was enshrined in the National Aviation Hall of Fame for his work as a test pilot and record setter in the 1950s.

Was no relation to General Frank F. Everest.
